= Chausseestraße =

Street in Berlin, Germany

- Chausseestrasse
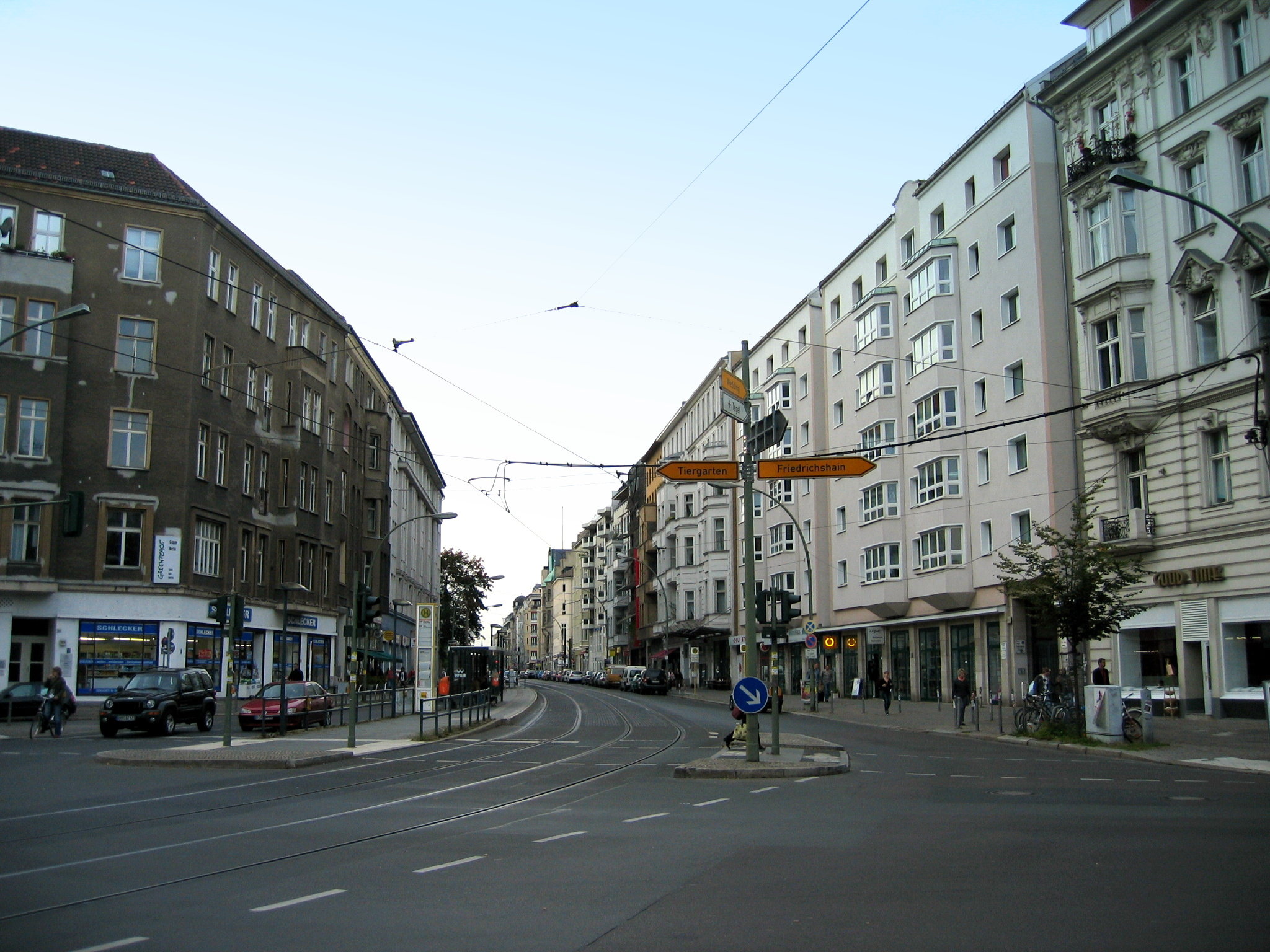
- Chausseestraße
- Interactive map of Chausseestraße
- Former names: Heerweg; (15th century–c. 1750); Ruppiner Straße; (c. 1750–c. 1800); Oranienburger Landstraße; (17th century–c. 1800)
- Namesake: Chaussee
- Type: Street
- Length: 1,700 m (5,600 ft)
- Location: Berlin, Germany
- Quarter: Mitte
- Nearest metro station: Oranienburger Tor; Naturkundemuseum; Schwartzkopffstraße; Reinickendorfer Straße
- Coordinates: 52°32′06″N 13°22′39″E
- Southeast end: Friedrichstraße; Torstraße; Hannoversche Straße
- Major junctions: Invalidenstraße; Schwartzkopffstraße; Liesenstraße; Boyenstraße
- Northwest end: Müllerstraße

Construction
- Completion: c. 1800

Chausseestraße, or Chausseestrasse (see ß; German pronunciation: [ʃɔˈseːˌʃtʁaːsə]), is a major street in the centre of Berlin, located in the district of Mitte. It is 1.7 kilometres long. Many notable buildings and structures are located along the street, including the Headquarters of the Federal Intelligence Service (BND). During the Cold War, the Chausseestraße crossing point, directly adjacent to the new BND headquarters, was one of the main crossing points between West Berlin and East Germany.
