= Stadion der Weltjugend =

Multi-use stadium in Berlin

Coordinates: 52°31′59.06″N 13°22′35.70″E

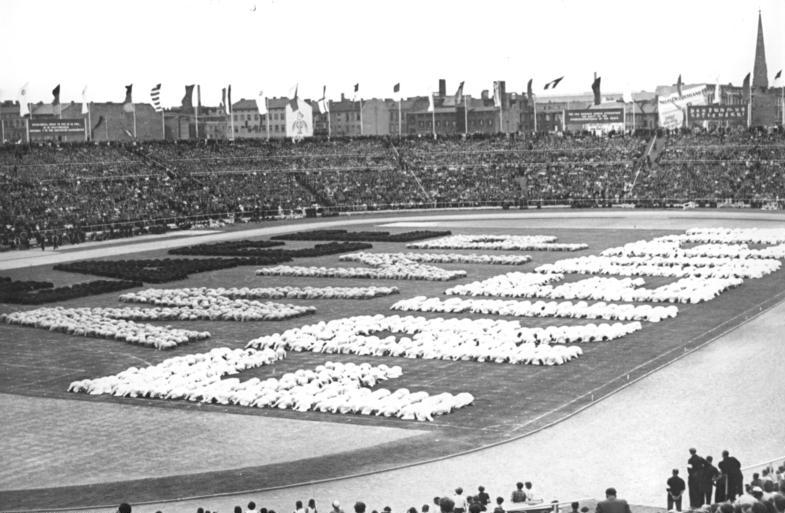
- Walter-Ulbricht-Stadion in August 1951.
- Interactive map of Stadion der Weltjugend
- Former names: Walter-Ulbricht-Stadion (1950–1973)
- Location: East Germany, East Berlin
- Capacity: 70,000 (1950–1973); 50,000 (1973–1992)

Construction
- Opened: 20 May 1950
- Renovated: 1972–1973
- Closed: 1992
- Architects: Selman Selmanagić; Reinhard Lingner

Tenants
- SC Dynamo Berlin (1954–1955, 1956-1961); FDGB-Pokal Final (1950, 1975 to 1989); World Festival of Youth and Students (1951 and 1973); 13 matches of East Germany football team

Stadion der Weltjugend was a multi-use stadium in the locality of Mitte in the eponymous borough of Mitte in Berlin, Germany. It was inaugurated on 20 May 1950 by the First Secretary of the Socialist Unity Party, Walter Ulbricht for the first "Deutschlandtreffen" ("German Festival") of the Free German Youth. The stadium was named after Walter Ulbricht. In the vernacular of Berlin, the stadium was later called Zickenwiese after Ulbricht's beard.

The Walter-Ulbricht-Stadion had a capacity of 70,000 spectators and was complemented by several further football pitches, tennis courts and athletic fields. It was the largest stadium in East Germany at its opening. The stadium was a site of the 3rd World Festival of Youth and Students in 1951. The stadium was redeveloped ahead of the 10th World Festival of Youth and Students in 1973, together with the Friedrich-Ludwig-Jahn-Sportpark. The redevelopment included the installation of seating, which reduced the capacity to 50,000. The redeveloped stadium was then also renamed to Stadion der Weltjugend ("Stadium of the World Youth").

The Walter Ulbricht-Stadion was the home ground of the football team of SC Dynamo Berlin until September 1961. (Note: SC Dynamo Berlin played the short transitional 1955 season during the autumn of 1955 at the football stadium in the Dynamo-Sportforum, but returned to the Walter-Ulbricht Stadion for the 1956 season.) It was also the venue for the FDGB-Pokal (East German cup) final in 1951 and from 1975 to 1989. The East Germany national football team played 13 times at the stadium. The stadium was used for all matches in the derby between BFC Dynamo and 1. FC Union Berlin for security reasons from 1976 to 1989.

The stadium was bordered by the Chausseestraße on the east, by the Habersaathstraße (known as Kesselstraße until 1951) on the south and residential areas on Scharnhorststraße and Boyenstraße on the north and west respectively. The Scharnhorststraße heating plant (German: Heizwerk Scharnhorststraße) (de) with its 150-meter chimney was located right next to the western curve of the stadium. The stadium was initially served by the Schwartzkopffstraße U-Bahn stadion. The station was renamed Walter-Ulbricht-Stadion after the stadium in 1951. The Walter-Ulbricht-Stadion U-bahn station was closed after the construction of the Berlin Wall in 1961. The station was renamed Stadion der Weltjugend after the stadium was renamed in 1973.

The stadium was demolished in 1992 in preparation for the construction of a new arena for the 2000 Summer Olympics. As Berlin failed in the bidding process, the area remained abandoned. The construction of the new headquarters of the Federal Intelligence Service began on the site in 2006.

== See also ==
- Friedrich-Ludwig-Jahn-Sportpark
- Werner-Seelenbinder-Halle
