= Headquarters of the Federal Intelligence Service =

Government facility housing Germany's intelligence agency (BND) in central Berlin

- Zentrale des Bundesnachrichtendienstes
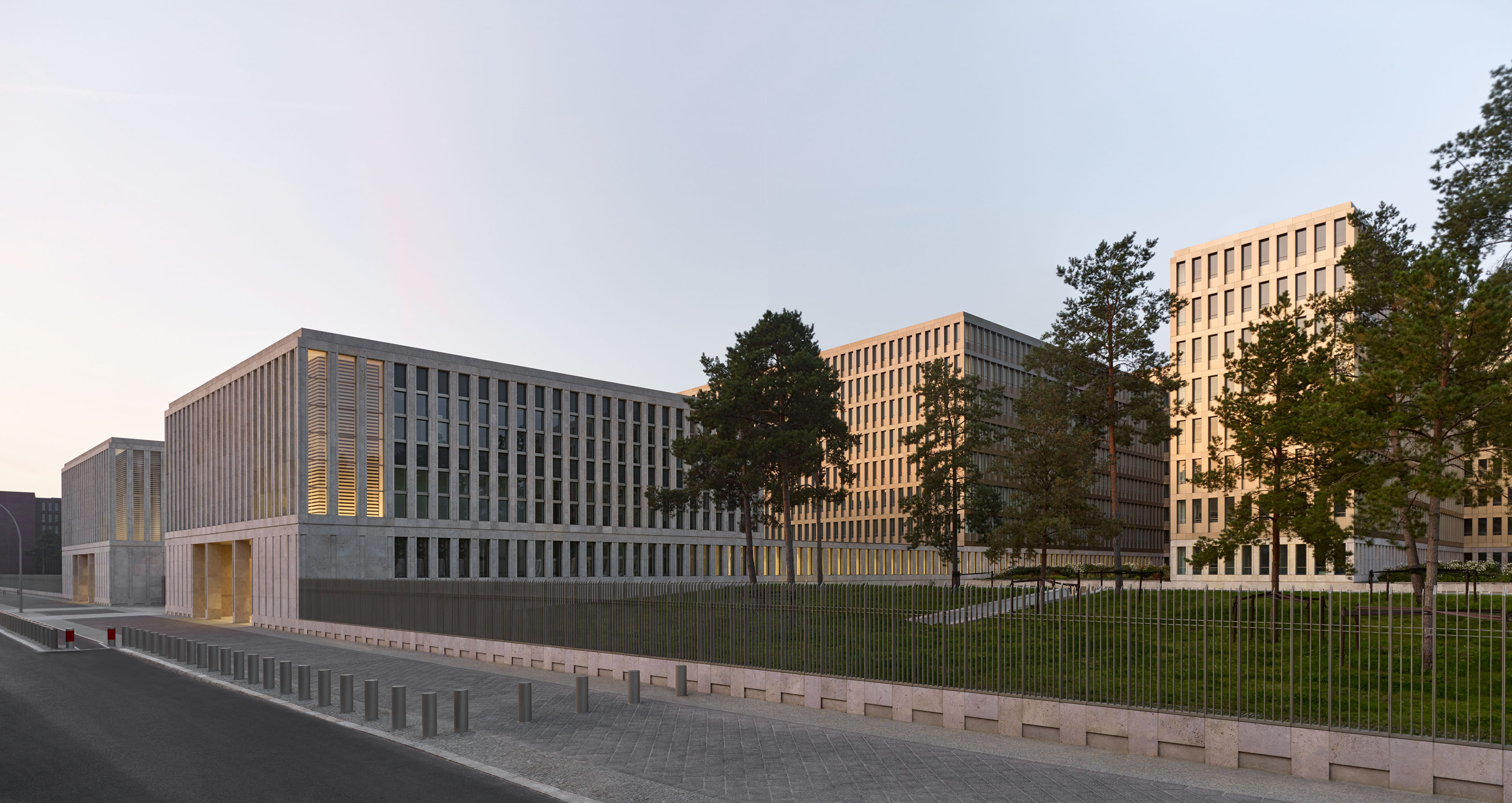
- View of building entrance from Chausseestraße
- Interactive map of the Headquarters of the Federal Intelligence Service area

General information
- Status: Completed
- Type: Office
- Architectural style: International Style
- Location: Chausseestraße 96, Mitte, 10115, Berlin, Germany
- Coordinates: 52.533889°N 13.376667°E
- Current tenants: Federal Intelligence Service (BND)
- Construction started: 2006
- Topped-out: March 2010
- Completed: November 2016
- Opened: 2017
- Cost: €1.086 billion
- Client: Institute for Federal Real Estate
- Owner: Germany

Technical details
- Floor count: Nine stories above ground
- Floor area: 260,000 square metres (2,800,000 sq ft)

Design and construction
- Architect: Jan Kleihues
- Architecture firm: Kleihues + Kleihues

Other information
- Number of rooms: 5,000+
- Public transit: Schwartzkopffstraße

The Headquarters of the Federal Intelligence Service or the BND Headquarters (German: Zentrale des Bundesnachrichtendienstes, colloquially the BND-Zentrale) is the headquarters of the Federal Intelligence Service (BND) of Germany, and is located at the Chausseestraße in the Mitte district in the centre of Berlin. The building that houses its headquarters is the largest intelligence building in the world, surpassing the CIA headquarters in Langley, Virginia, in 2019.

== History ==
The complex was designed by the architect firm Kleihues + Kleihues. Construction started in 2006 and was completed in 2017. With 260,000 m^{2} (2.8 million ft²) and around 4,000 people working there, it is the world's largest intelligence headquarters. It is also Berlin's second largest building, after Berlin Tempelhof Airport. The first employees moved into the new complex in late 2017; the relocation from the former headquarters in Pullach was completed in the autumn of 2018.

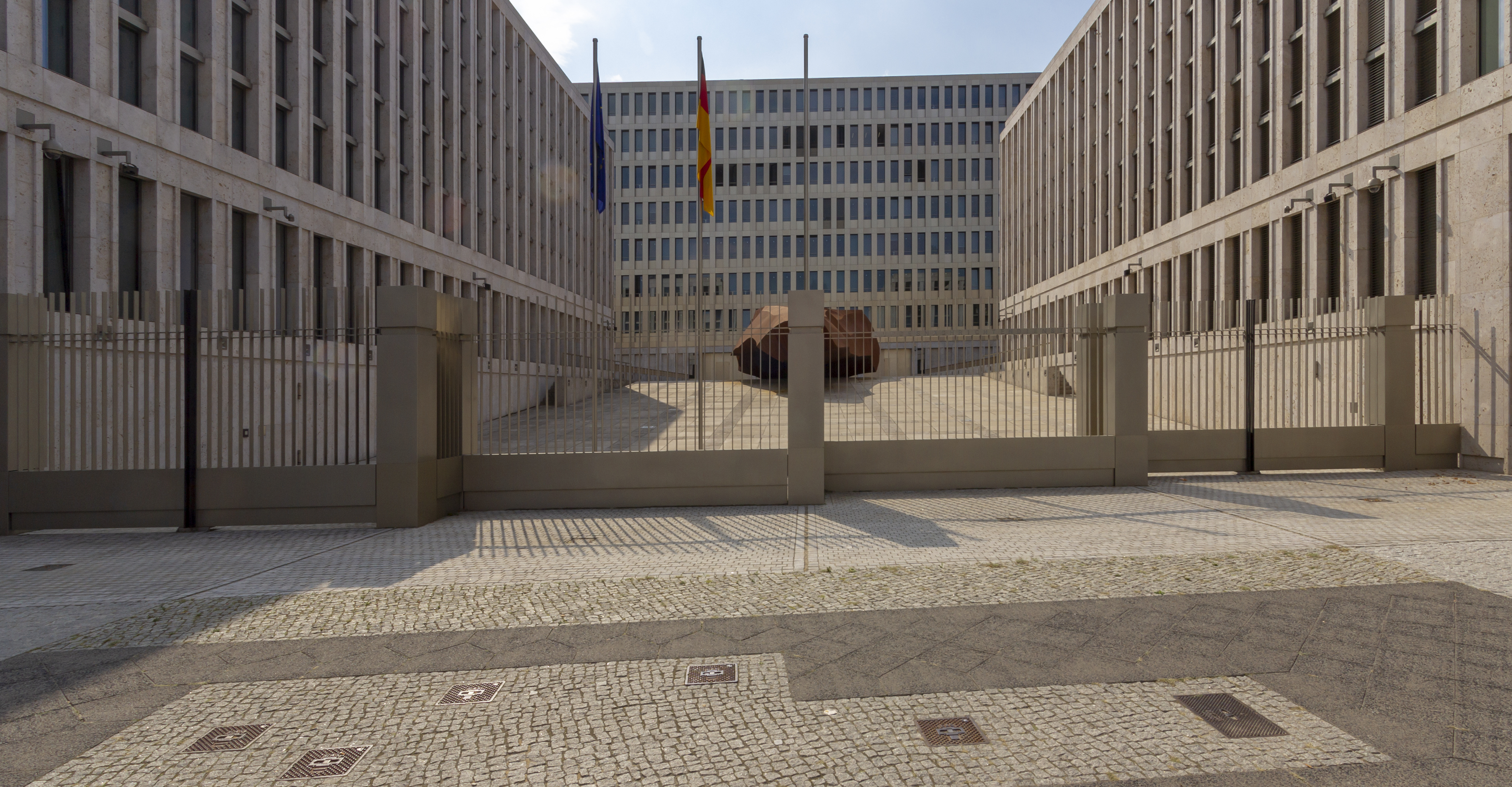
BND headquarters in Berlin

The headquarters is located near the former trace of the Berlin Wall, on the eastern side, some 350 meters (1150 ft) from the canal which marked the border to West Berlin during the Cold War, and directly adjacent to the former Chausseestraße crossing point. The headquarters are built on the site of the former stadium Stadion der Weltjugend.

Following the decision to build the new BND headquarters there, a massive urban renewal has taken place in the neighbourhood, with many new construction projects opposite the BND headquarters, including high-end apartment buildings, a new park, a new hotel, and buildings housing office spaces and retail stores.

The headquarters includes a visitor center that is open to the public; it is the first intelligence organisation to have such a center.

Although completed in 2017, the official opening was held in February 2019. Angela Merkel, Chancellor of Germany attended and made this statement: "In an often very confusing world, now, more urgently than ever, Germany needs a strong and efficient foreign intelligence service". At the time, some 4,000 employees were expected to work from this location, moving here from the former headquarters in a suburb of Munich. The agency's total number of employees, in Germany and other countries, was approximately 6,500.
