= Invalidenstraße =

Street in Berlin, Germany

- Invalidenstrasse
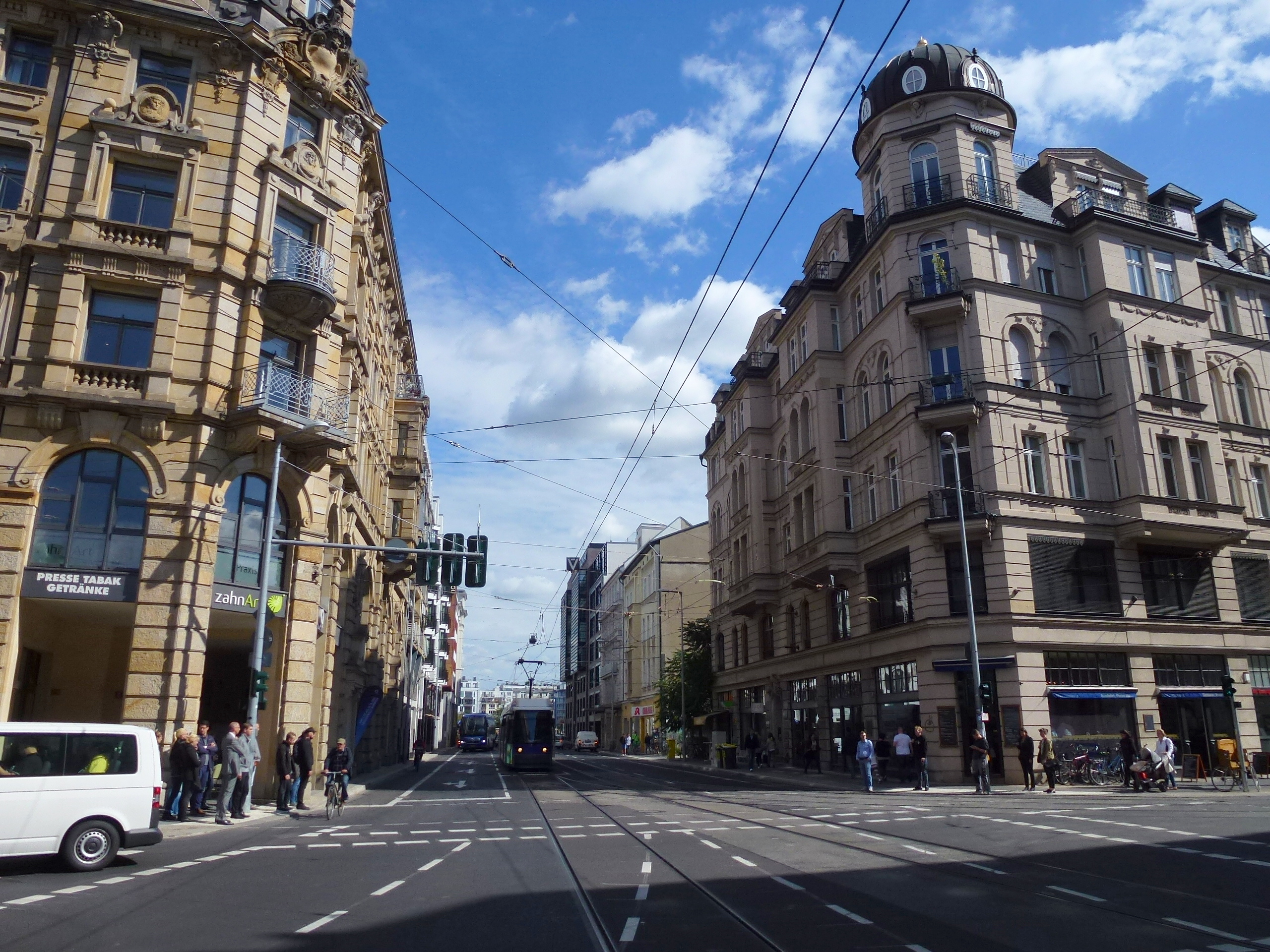
- View east along Invalidenstraße from Chausseestraße, 2015
- Interactive map of Invalidenstraße
- Former names: Spandauer Heerweg; (13th century–c. 1800)
- Namesake: Invalidenhaus Berlin
- Type: Street
- Location: Berlin, Germany
- Quarter: Mitte, Moabit
- Nearest metro station: Rosenthaler Platz; Nordbahnhof; Naturkundemuseum; Hauptbahnhof
- Coordinates: 52°31′43″N 13°22′35″E
- East end: Veteranenstraße; Brunnenstraße
- Major junctions: Ackerstraße; Pappelplatz; Bergstraße; Gartenstraße; Chausseestraße; Platz vor dem Neuen Tor/ Robert-Koch-Platz; Luisenstraße; Scharnhorststraße; Alexanderufer; Heidestraße; Europaplatz; Minna-Cauer-Straße; Lehrter Straße
- West end: Alt-Moabit/Werftstraße

Invalidenstraße, or Invalidenstrasse (see ß), is a street in Berlin, Germany. It runs east to west for three kilometers (1.9 mi) through the districts of Mitte and Moabit. The street originally connected three important railway stations in the northern city centre: the Stettiner Bahnhof (today Nordbahnhof), the Hamburger Bahnhof and the Lehrter Bahnhof, the present-day Berlin Hauptbahnhof.

== History ==
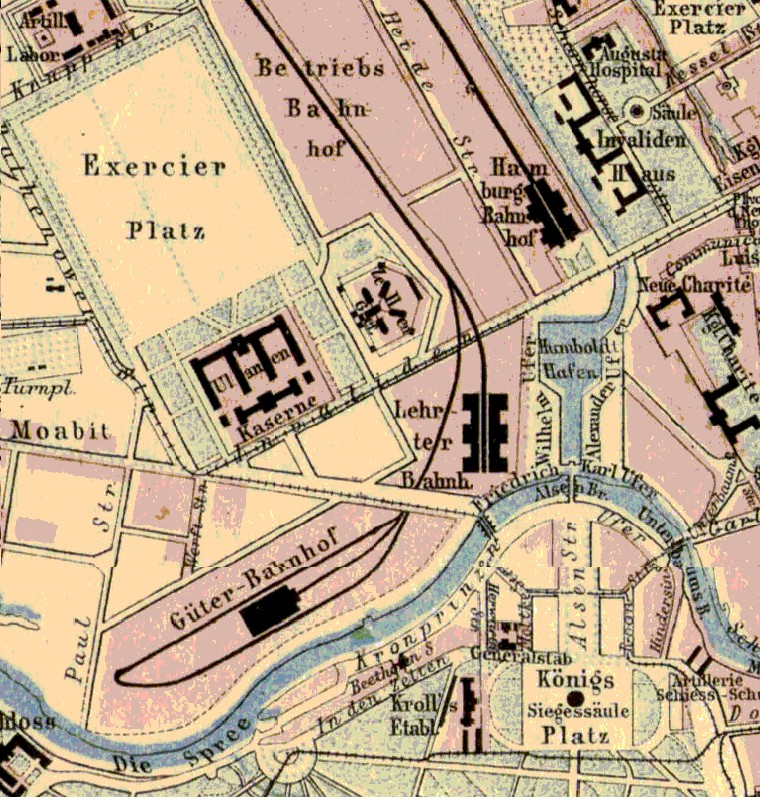
The western end of the Invalidenstraße with Lehrter and Hamburger Bahnhof on an 1875 map

The street was laid out in the 13th century and originally named Spandauer Heerweg. It was renamed after a hostel erected in 1748 by the order of King Frederick II of Prussia, the Invalidenhaus, which served the veterans that fought in the Silesian Wars. Today the remaining parts of this building house offices for the Federal Ministry of Economics. On western Invalidenstraße was the site of the notorious Moabit cell prison and large barracks of the Prussian Uhlans (Uhlanenkaserne).

=== East–West border crossing ===
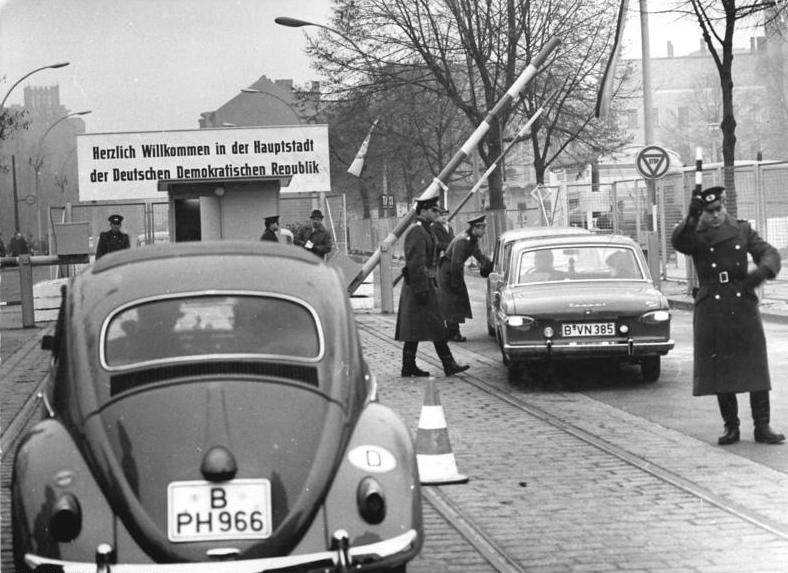
Invalidenstraße border crossing, entering East Berlin

After World War II Invalidenstraße was divided between East and West Berlin and the Sandkrugbrücke crossing the Berlin–Spandau Shipping Canal was the location of a border crossing. Nearby on August 24, 1961 Günter Litfin attempting to flee to the west was shot by East German border troops, becoming the second victim at the Berlin Wall erected eleven days before. A memorial marks the site.

== Invalidenstraße today ==
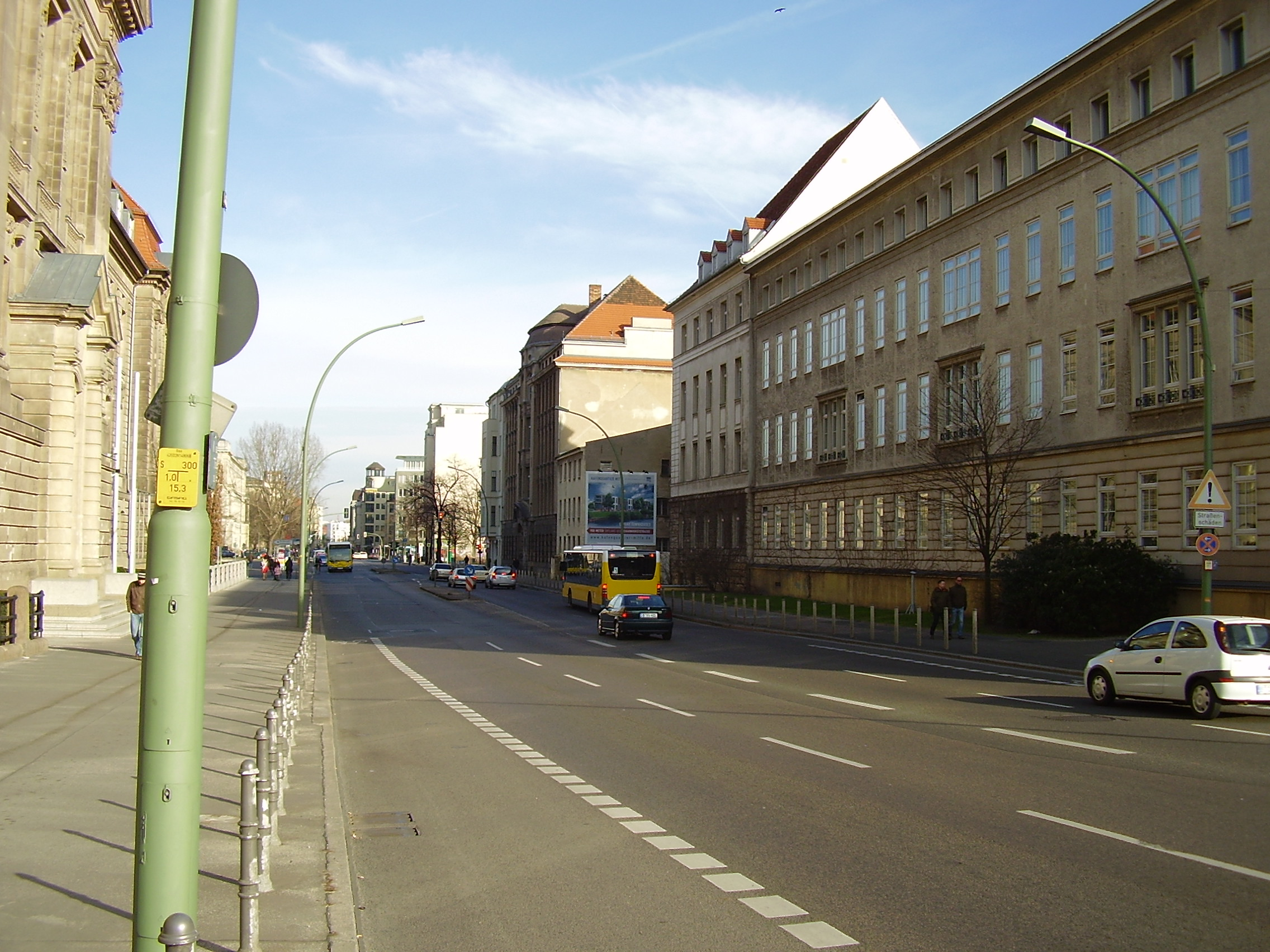
Invalidenstraße with Ministry of Economics (left) and Charité (right)

After German reunification, Invalidenstraße became one of the most important arterial roads in Berlin, particularly after the opening of the new Berlin Hauptbahnhof. A further expansion including a tramway line is planned.

Several public institutions and federal ministries are situated along the street: the Museum of Natural History and the faculties of agriculture and horticulture of the Humboldt University of Berlin as well as the Federal Ministry of Transport and, on the other side of the Invalidenpark, the Federal Ministry of Economics opposite of the Charité hospital Campus Mitte. Beyond the Sandkrugbrücke in Moabit the former Hamburger Bahnhof train station has been converted into the Museum für Gegenwart.

== See also ==
- Invalidenfriedhof Cemetery
