= Naturkundemuseum station =

Station of the Berlin U-Bahn

Coordinates: 52°31′52″N 13°22′57″E

Naturkundemuseum
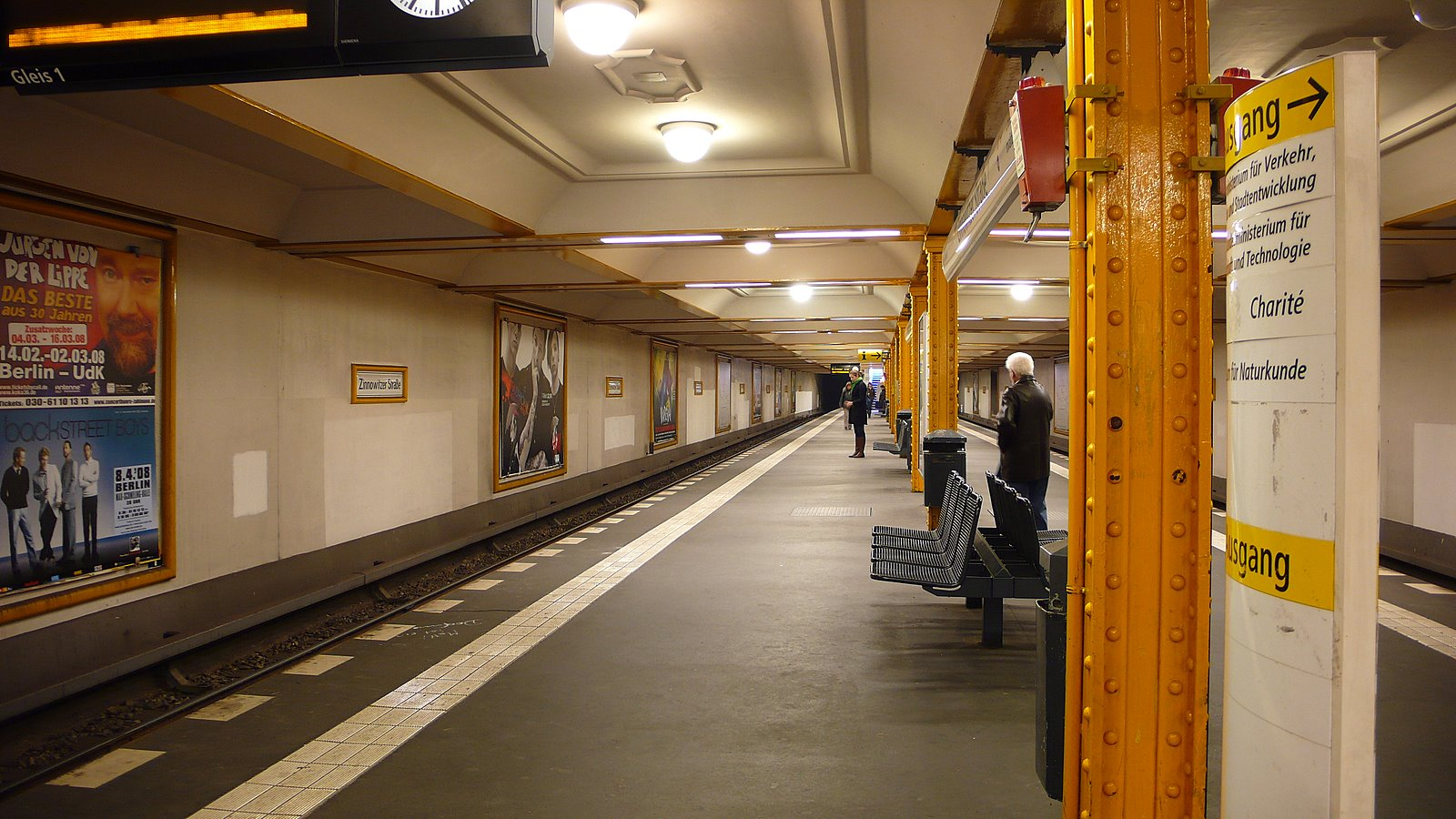
- Platform view of Naturkundemuseum

General information
- Location: Mitte
- Owner: Berliner Verkehrsbetriebe
- Operator: Berliner Verkehrsbetriebe
- Platforms: 1 island platform
- Tracks: 2
- Train operators: Berliner Verkehrsbetriebe

Construction
- Structure type: Underground

Other information
- Fare zone: VBB: Berlin A/5555

History
- Opened: 30 January 1923; 103 years ago

Services
Preceding station	Berlin U-Bahn	Following station
Schwartzkopffstraße towards Alt-Tegel	U6	Oranienburger Tor towards Alt-Mariendorf
Location

Naturkundemuseum, formerly Zinnowitzer Straße, is a Berlin U-Bahn station located on the U6 in the district Mitte.

== History ==
The station was opened on 30 January 1923 as Stettiner Bahnhof after the nearby long-distance station Stettiner Bahnhof. It is located 4.6 meters below Chausseestraße at the intersection of Chausseestraße and Invalidenstraße. It was built in 1913–14 and modified after 1919 by Alfred Grenander and Alfred Fehse, following the plans of Heinrich Jennen. Both developed a white station with a central platform; the station signs bore a yellow border. The BVG uses the abbreviation Zw for the station. The station has disabled access via a lift ascending to Invalidenstraße.

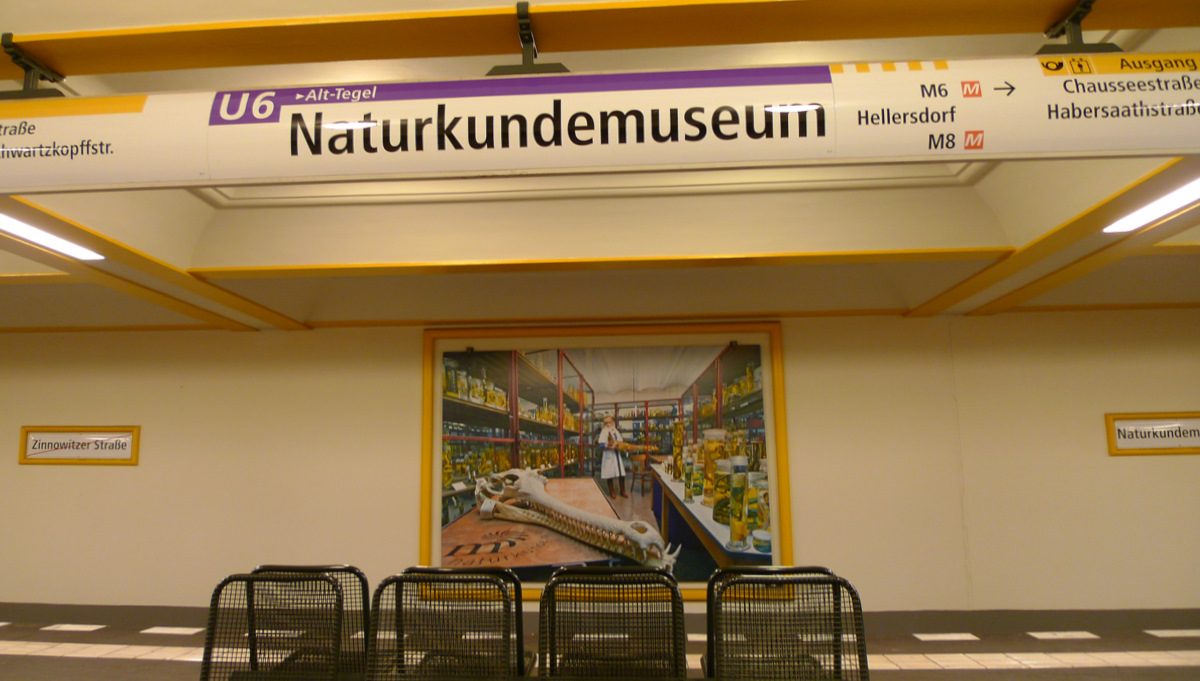
New design of the Naturkundemuseum station

From April to July 1945, the station was closed because of war damage involving the ceiling openings. In 1951, it was renamed Nordbahnhof ("North Station"), since the nearby Stettiner Bahnhof was no longer called by its original name because the formerly German city of Stettin had become the Polish city of Szczecin after the war. After the construction of the Berlin Wall on 13 August 1961, the station was a "ghost station" and was not in service until 1 July 1990, after German reunification. West Berlin trains ran through this and other stations without stopping, since only a few central U6 stations were on the east side of the Berlin Wall. Following renovation work in the 1990s, for example the BVG built a lift and extended the platform to 100 m, the station became a protected building.

After 1991, to avoid confusion by implying a physical connection with the S-Bahn Nordbahnhof, the station was renamed Zinnowitzer Straße after a minor street at the northern exit of the station. Since this name was somewhat obscure, various passenger groups and politicians suggested in 2007 that the station be renamed either Museum für Naturkunde or Naturkundemuseum after the well-known nearby Natural History Museum. After long discussions, a renaming was announced, but then delayed. From 30 December 2008, the Berlin firm WALL AG, in anticipation of the renaming, made seven decorative advertisement panels available on which the Museum für Naturkunde displayed large-format color photographs of museum staff working with various objects from the collections. With the official change in the timetable by the BVG on 13 December 2009, the renaming as Naturkundemuseum finally took place.
