= Reinickendorfer Straße station =

Station of the Berlin U-Bahn

Coordinates: 52°32′24″N 13°22′13″E

Reinickendorfer Straße
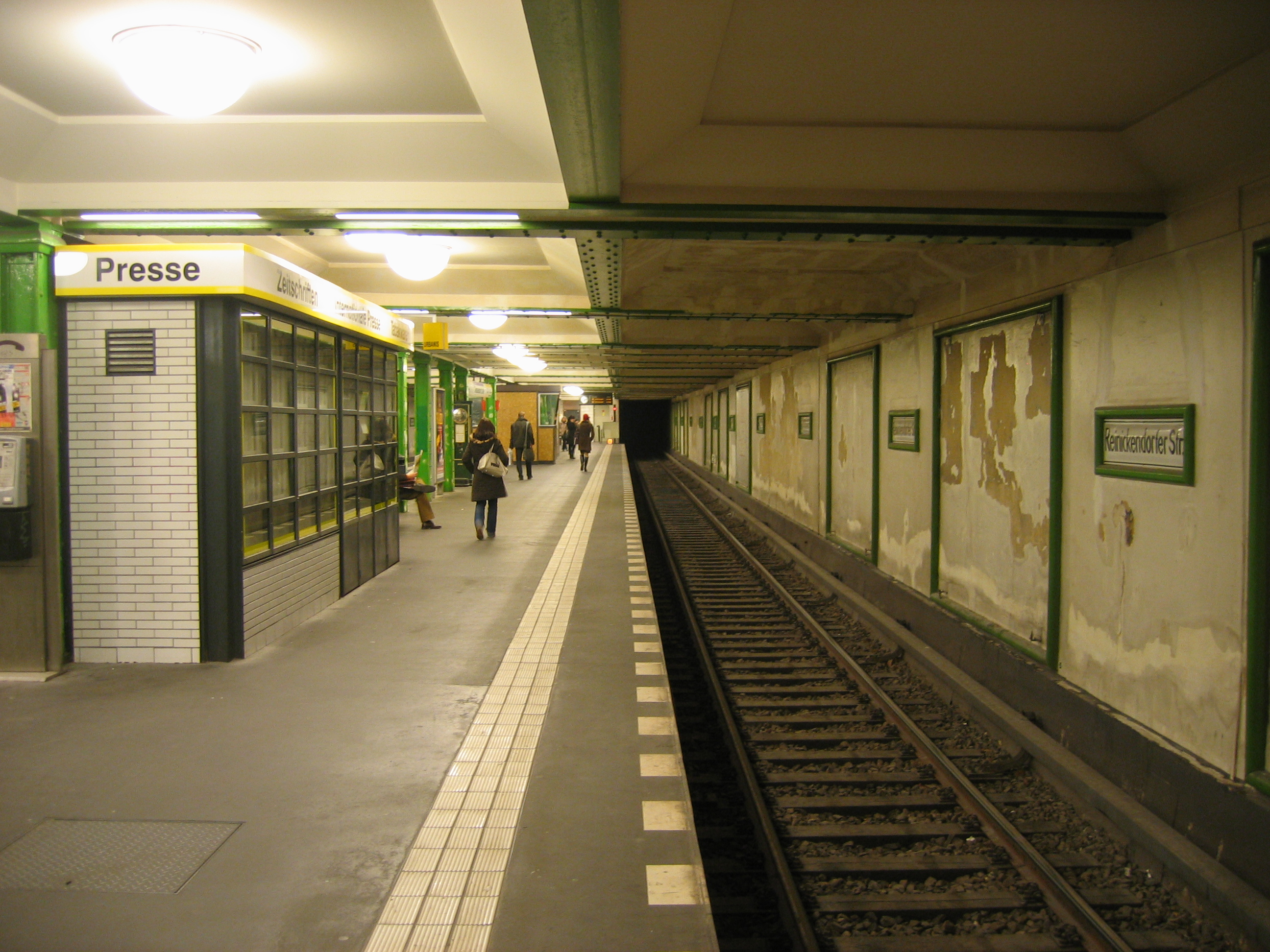
- Platform view of Reinickendorfer Straße

General information
- Location: Mitte
- Owner: Berliner Verkehrsbetriebe
- Operator: Berliner Verkehrsbetriebe
- Platforms: 1 island platform
- Tracks: 2
- Train operators: Berliner Verkehrsbetriebe

Construction
- Structure type: Underground

Other information
- Fare zone: VBB: Berlin A/5555

History
- Opened: 8 March 1923; 103 years ago

Services
Preceding station	Berlin U-Bahn	Following station
Wedding towards Alt-Tegel	U6	Schwartzkopffstraße towards Alt-Mariendorf
Location

Reinickendorfer Straße is a Berlin U-Bahn station located on the U6.

== History ==
Opened in 1923 and due to severe financial problems at the time of the station's construction, it was designed in a very simple way. The walls are plastered and only advertisement panels cover the station. On 22 May 1944, two ceiling openings in the station were created by air raids.

As the platform was only 80 m long, it was extended in 1993.

Designers of the station were Alfred Grenander, Fehse and Jennen. The nearby chemistry company Schering would like to see this station renamed to Scheringwerke (like e.g. Borsigwerke).
