= Oranienburger Tor station =

Station of the Berlin U-Bahn

Coordinates: 52°31′32″N 13°23′14″E

Oranienburger Tor
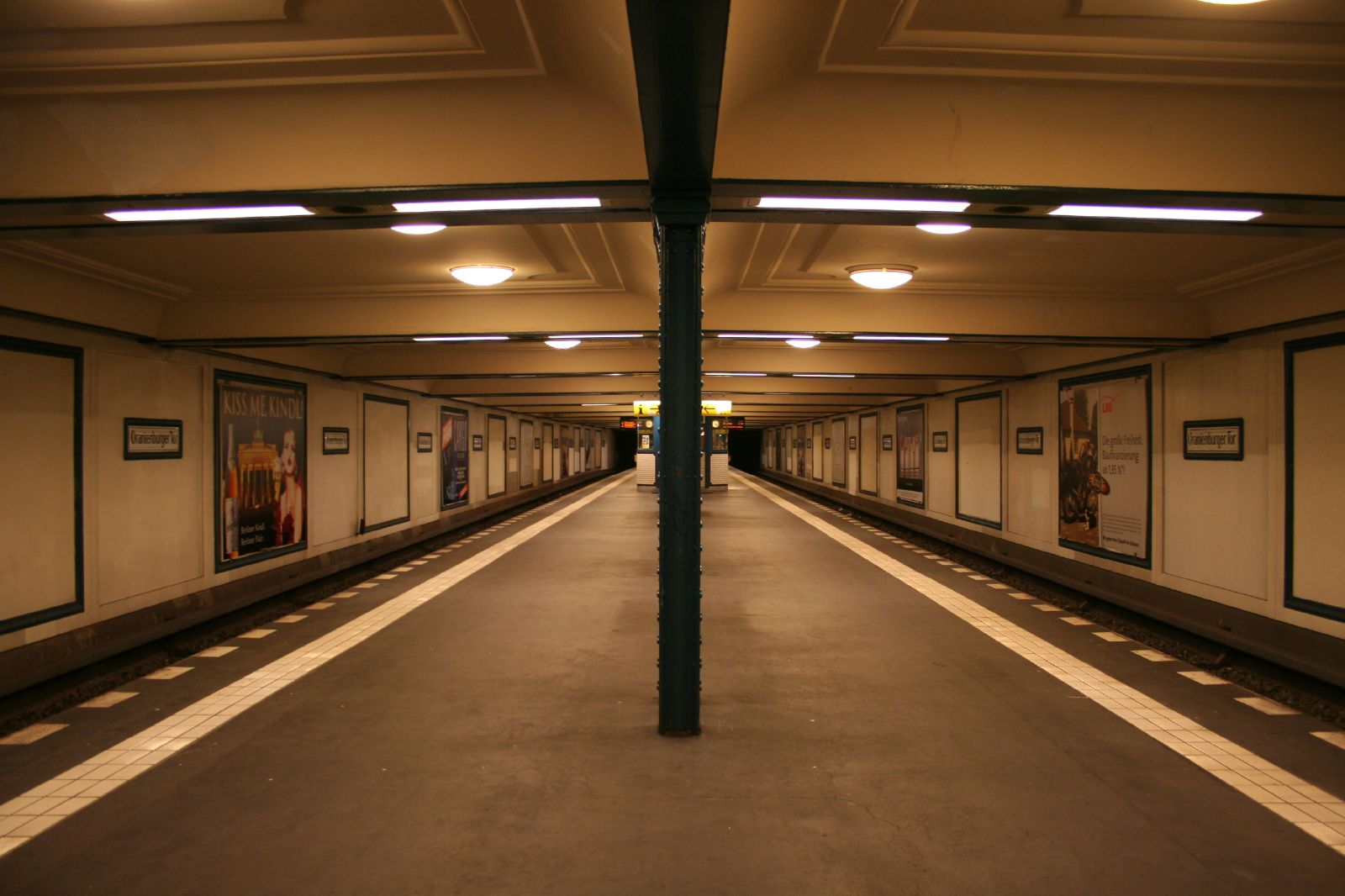
- Platform view of Oranienburger Tor

General information
- Location: Mitte
- Owner: Berliner Verkehrsbetriebe
- Operator: Berliner Verkehrsbetriebe
- Platforms: 1 island platform
- Tracks: 2
- Train operators: Berliner Verkehrsbetriebe

Construction
- Structure type: Underground

Other information
- Fare zone: VBB: Berlin A/5555

History
- Opened: 30 January 1923; 103 years ago

Services
Preceding station	Berlin U-Bahn	Following station
Naturkundemuseum towards Alt-Tegel	U6	Friedrichstraße towards Alt-Mariendorf
Location

Oranienburger Tor is a Berlin U-Bahn station located on the U6. It is located 4.90 metres (16.1 ft) below the street.

The station was designed by Alfred Grenander, built in 1915, and officially opened on 30 January 1923.

Between April and June 1945, the station was closed because of war damage.

It was also a ghost station during the division of Berlin. It was reopened on 1 July 1990, when the border crossings came down.
