= Schwartzkopffstraße station =

Station of the Berlin U-Bahn

Coordinates: 52°32′7″N 13°22′38″E

Schwartzkopffstraße
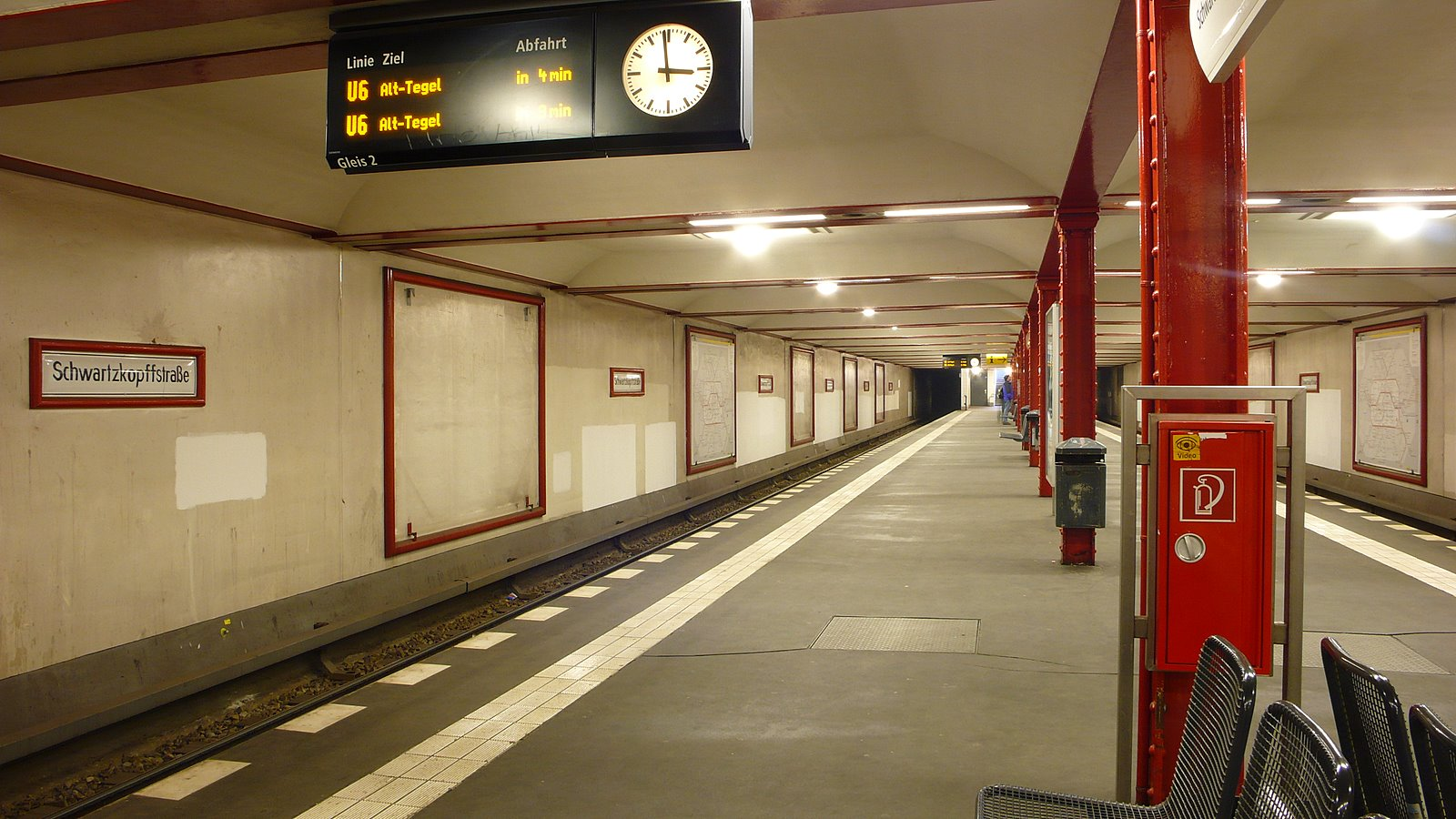
- Platform view of Schwartzkopffstraße

General information
- Location: Mitte
- Owner: Berliner Verkehrsbetriebe
- Operator: Berliner Verkehrsbetriebe
- Platforms: 1 island platform
- Tracks: 2
- Train operators: Berliner Verkehrsbetriebe

Construction
- Structure type: Underground

Other information
- Fare zone: VBB: Berlin A/5555

History
- Opened: 8 March 1923; 103 years ago

Services
Preceding station	Berlin U-Bahn	Following station
Reinickendorfer Straße towards Alt-Tegel	U6	Naturkundemuseum towards Alt-Mariendorf
Location

Schwartzkopffstraße is a Berlin U-Bahn station located on the U6 line.

== History ==
The station was built in 1923 and designed by architects Alfred Grenander, Alfred Fehse and Heinrich Jennen. Due to massive financial problems, the station was built in a very simple way, without any artwork: the walls are covered only in plaster, and many columns are left as exposed, painted steel. In 1951 the station was renamed "Walter-Ulbricht-Stadion" after the stadium nearby.

In 1961 the station was closed due to the building of the Berlin Wall, rendering it a so-called "ghost station"; trains then passed through the station without stopping. In 1973, despite having been closed for over 11 years, the station was renamed "Stadion der Weltjugend" to reflect the change in name of the stadium. This change was visible only to East German guards patrolling the platform, and West Berliners passing through the closed station, as ghost stations were not printed on East German city maps. It was secured with utmost care; the station entrances were walled and equipped with observation points, and a locked access door. Rolls of barbed wire were installed to prevent people from crawling onto the tracks. All these measures were removed by 30 June 1990, and the station was reopened on 1 July 1990.

As a result of the demolition of the stadium, the station's name was changed back to Schwartzkopffstraße on 3 October 1991.

In 1995 the platform was lengthened to allow trains with six cars. Currently, all U6 trains stop at this station.

== Gallery ==
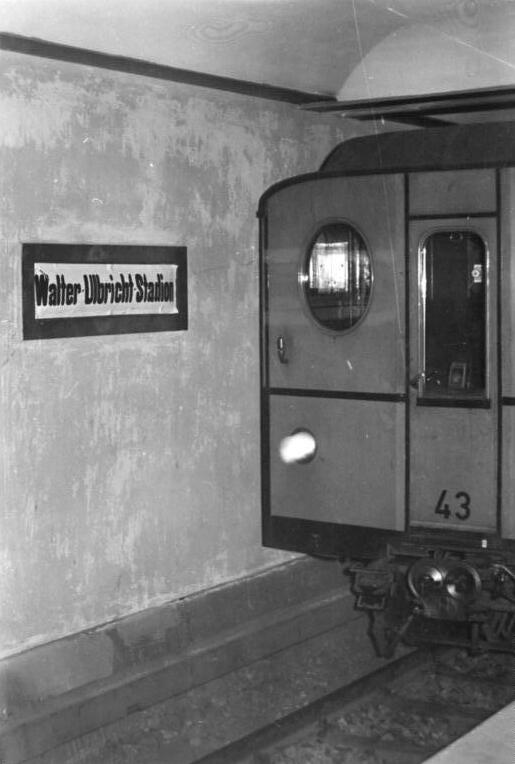
BI type train number 43 passes through the Walter-Ulbricht-Stadion station in 1951.
