= Mitte (locality) =

- Quarter of Berlin
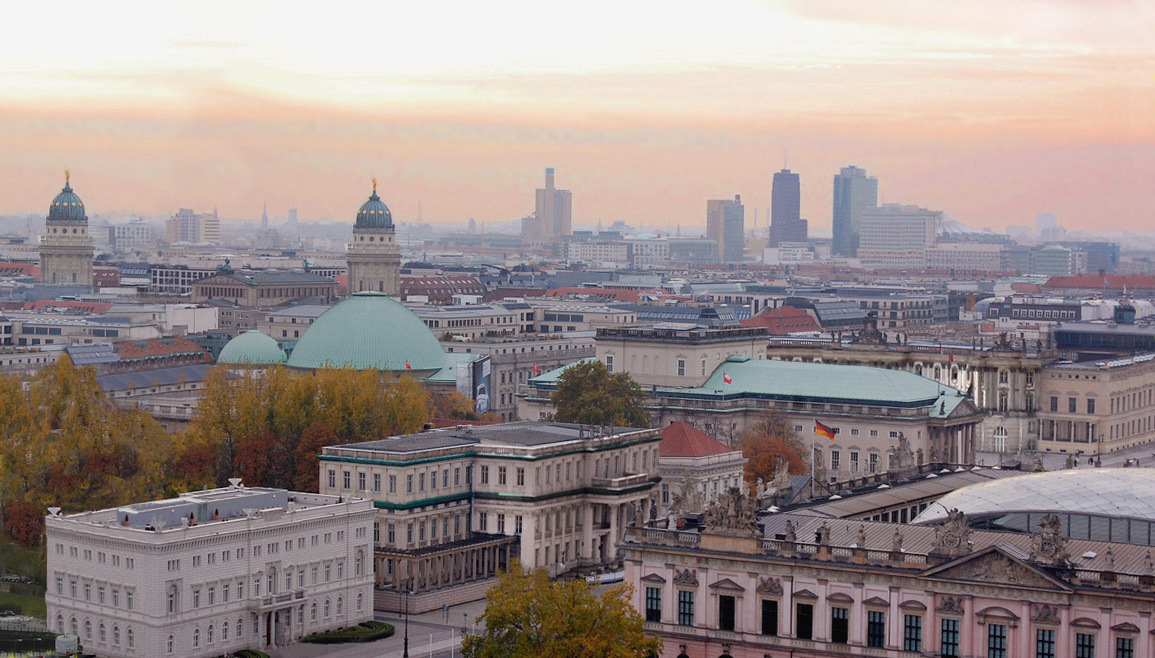
- Panoramic view

- Coat of arms

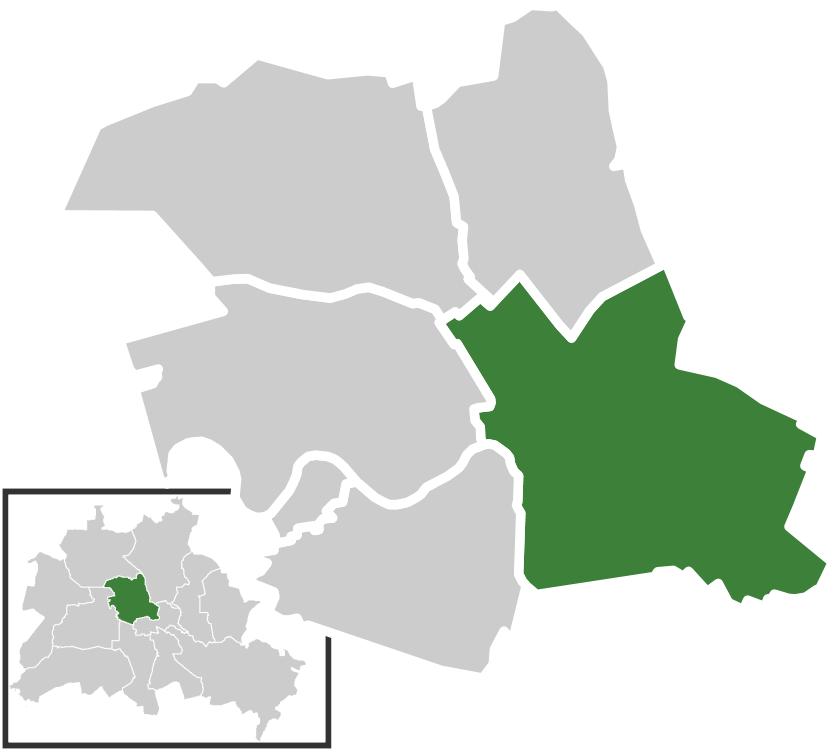
- Location of Mitte in Mitte district and Berlin
- Interactive map of Mitte
- Location within Germany Location within Berlin
- Coordinates: 52°31′10″N 13°24′24″E
- Country: Germany
- State: Berlin
- City: Berlin
- Borough: Mitte
- Founded: 1920
- Subdivisions: 13 zones

Area
  - Total: 10.7 km^{2} (4.1 sq mi)
- Elevation: 52 m (171 ft)

Population (2024-12-31)
  - Total: 108,254
  - Density: 10,100/km^{2} (26,200/sq mi)
- Time zone: UTC+01:00 (CET)
  - Summer (DST): UTC+02:00 (CEST)
- Postal codes: 10115, 10117, 10119, 10178, 10179, 10435
- Vehicle registration: B

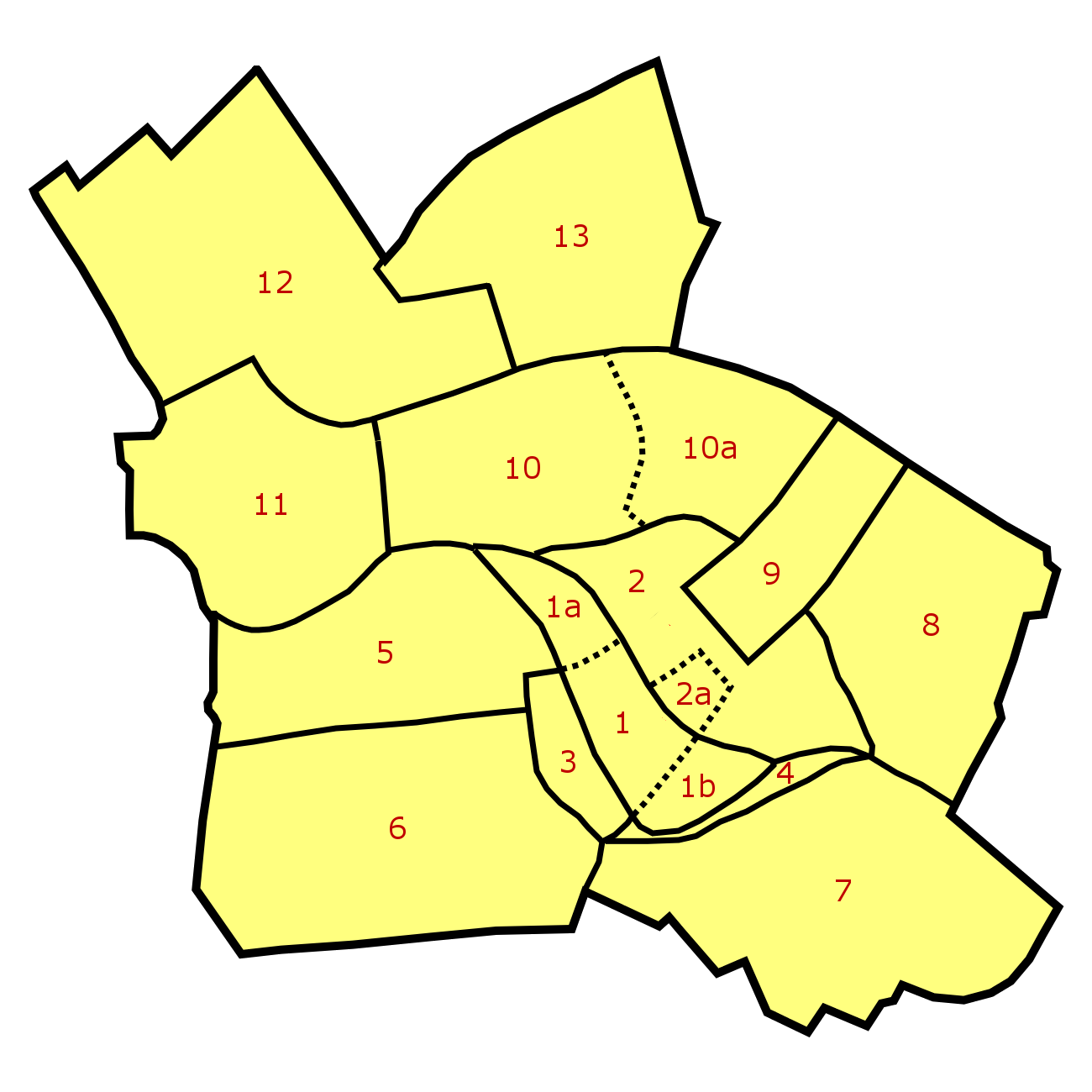
Quarters of Berlin-Mitte: Cölln (1); Museum Island (1a); Fisher Island (1b); Alt-Berlin (2); Nikolaiviertel (2a); Friedrichswerder (3); Neukölln am Wasser (4); Dorotheenstadt (5); Friedrichstadt (6); Luisenstadt (7); Stralauer Vorstadt (8); Alexanderplatz (9); Spandauer Vorstadt (10); Scheunenviertel (10a); Friedrich-Wilhelm-Stadt (11); Oranienburger Vorstadt (12); Rosenthaler Vorstadt (13)

Mitte on a city map of Berlin's center

Mitte (German pronunciation: [ˈmɪtə]; German for "middle" or "center") is a central section (Ortsteil) of Berlin, Germany, in the eponymous borough (Bezirk) of Mitte. Until 2001, it was itself an autonomous district.

Mitte proper comprises the historic center of Old Berlin, with the medieval churches of St. Nicholas and St. Mary, the Museum Island, city buildings (Rotes Rathaus and Altes Stadthaus), the Fernsehturm, and the Brandenburg Gate, along the central boulevard of Unter den Linden. For these reasons, Mitte is considered the "heart" of Berlin.

== History ==
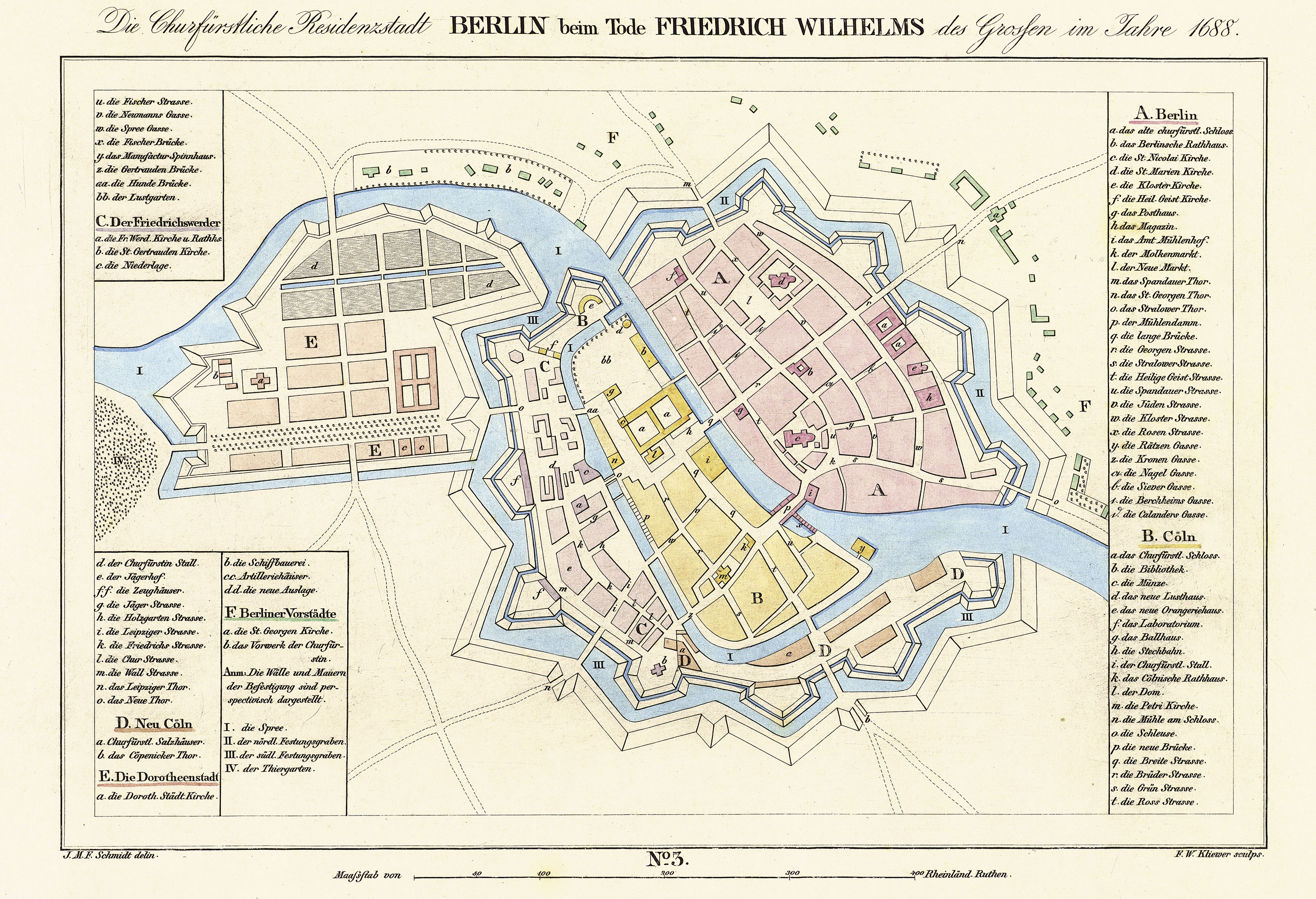
Map of 1688

Mitte comprises the historic center of Berlin (Altberlin and Cölln). Its history thus corresponds to the history of the entire city until the early 20th century, and with the Greater Berlin Act in 1920 it became the first district of the city. It was among the areas of the city most heavily damaged in World War II.

Following a territorial redeployment by the Soviet Union and the United Kingdom that reshaped the borders of West Berlin's British Sector in August 1945, the western part of Staaken became in effect as of 1 February 1951 an exclave of Mitte, then still a borough of East Berlin. This ended on 1 January 1961, when western Staaken was incorporated into then East German Falkensee, which had already been under its de facto administration since 1 June 1952.

Between 1961 and 1990, Mitte, one of the most important boroughs of East Berlin but close to all three western sectors of the city, was almost surrounded by the Berlin Wall. One of the most important border crossings was Checkpoint Charlie, near Kreuzberg.

== Geography ==
=== Position ===
Situated in central Berlin and mostly in its old town, it is traversed by the river Spree. It borders the localities (Ortsteile) of Tiergarten, Moabit, Wedding, Gesundbrunnen (all in Mitte district), Prenzlauer Berg (in Pankow district), Friedrichshain, and Kreuzberg (both in Friedrichshain-Kreuzberg district).

=== Subdivision ===
Mitte is subdivided into 13 zones or neighborhoods (Stadtviertel) (the numbers refer to the map above right):

- Cölln (1)
  - Museum Island (1a)
  - Fisher Island (1b)
- Alt-Berlin (2)
  - Nikolaiviertel (2a)
- Friedrichswerder (3)
- Neukölln am Wasser (4)
- Dorotheenstadt (5)
- Friedrichstadt (6)
- Luisenstadt (7)
- Stralauer Vorstadt (8)
- Alexanderplatz (9)
- Spandauer Vorstadt (10)
  - Scheunenviertel (10a)
- Friedrich-Wilhelm-Stadt (11)
- Oranienburger Vorstadt (12)
- Rosenthaler Vorstadt (13)

== Sister cities ==
- Higashiōsaka, Japan
- Holon, Israel

== Main sights ==
=== Buildings and structures ===
- Alte Nationalgalerie
- Altes Museum
- Altes Stadthaus
- Berlin Cathedral
- Berlin Palace with the Humboldt Forum
- Berlin State Opera
- Berliner Ensemble
- Brandenburg Gate
- Bode Museum
- Bundesrat of Germany
- Checkpoint Charlie
- Deutscher Dom
- Fernsehturm Berlin
- Fotografiska Berlin
- Französischer Dom
- Friedrichstadt-Palast
- Friedrichswerder Church
- Humboldt University
- James Simon Gallery
- Kino Babylon
- Konzerthaus Berlin
- Kunsthaus Tacheles
- Marienkirche
- Neue Synagoge
- Neues Museum
- Nikolaikirche
- Palast der Republik
- Pergamon Museum
- Reich Air Ministry
- Rotes Rathaus
- St. Hedwig's Cathedral
- Sophienkirche
- Staatsratsgebäude
- Stadtschloß

=== Places, squares and streets ===
- Alexanderplatz
- Bebelplatz
- Bernauer Straße
- Friedrichstraße
- Gendarmenmarkt
- Karl-Marx-Allee
- Leipziger Straße
- Lustgarten
- Marx-Engels-Forum
- Molkenmarkt
- Museum Island
- Nikolaiviertel
- Oranienburger Straße
- Pariser Platz
- Potsdamer Platz
- Schloßplatz
- Unter den Linden
- Voßstraße
- Wilhelmplatz
- Wilhelmstraße
- Zietenplatz

=== Photogallery ===
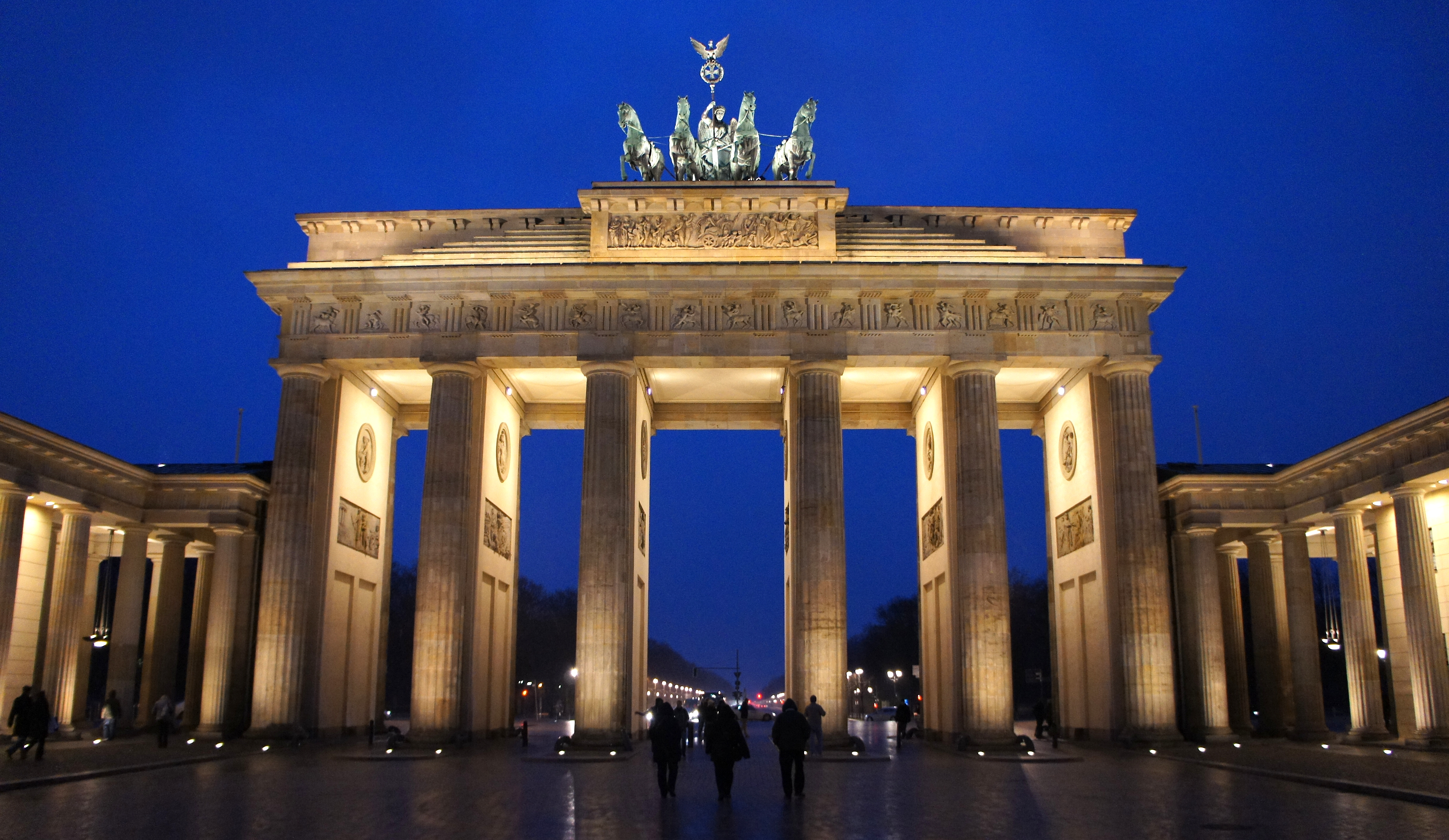
Brandenburg Gate

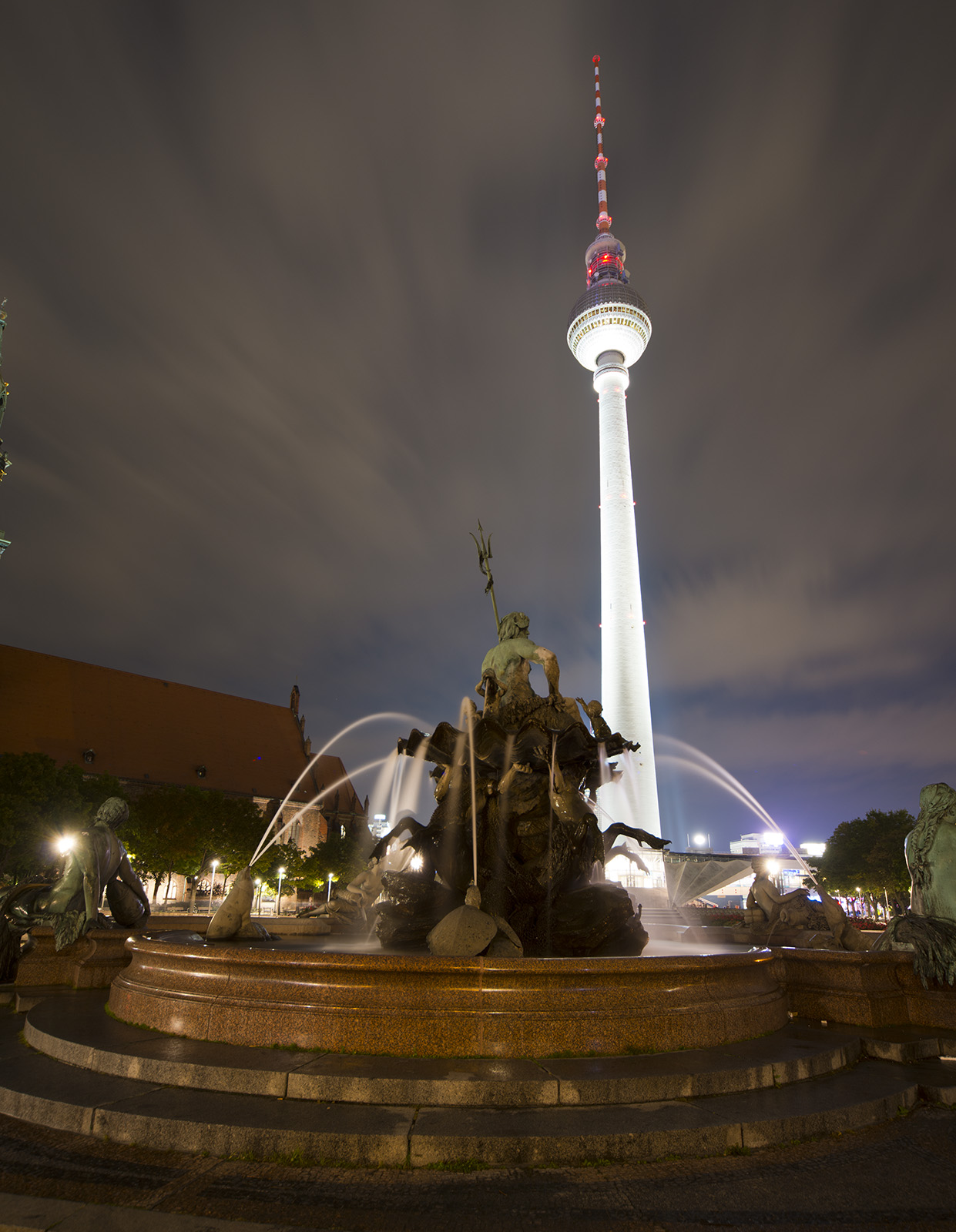
Fernsehturm

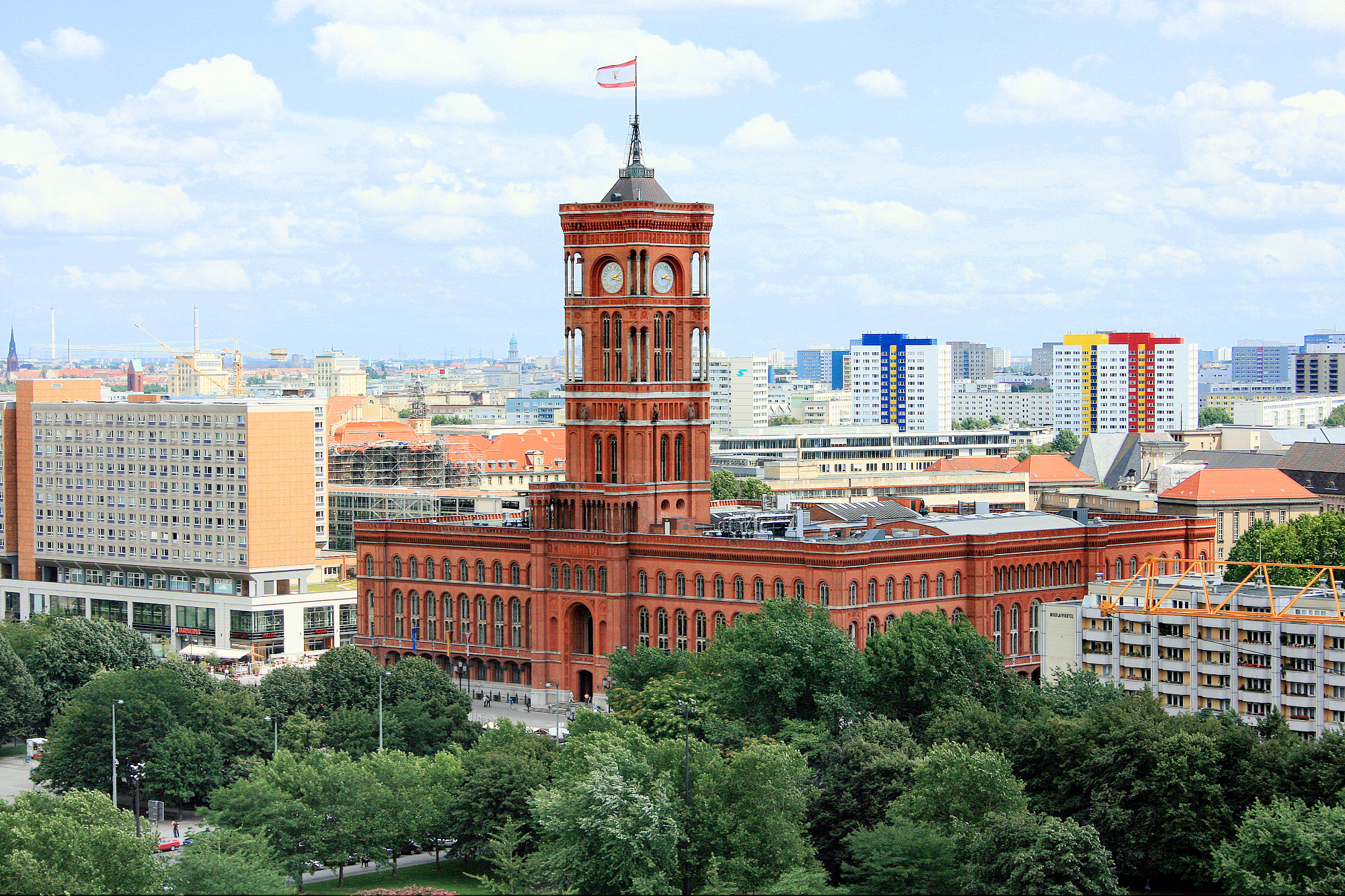
Rotes Rathaus

Alexanderplatz

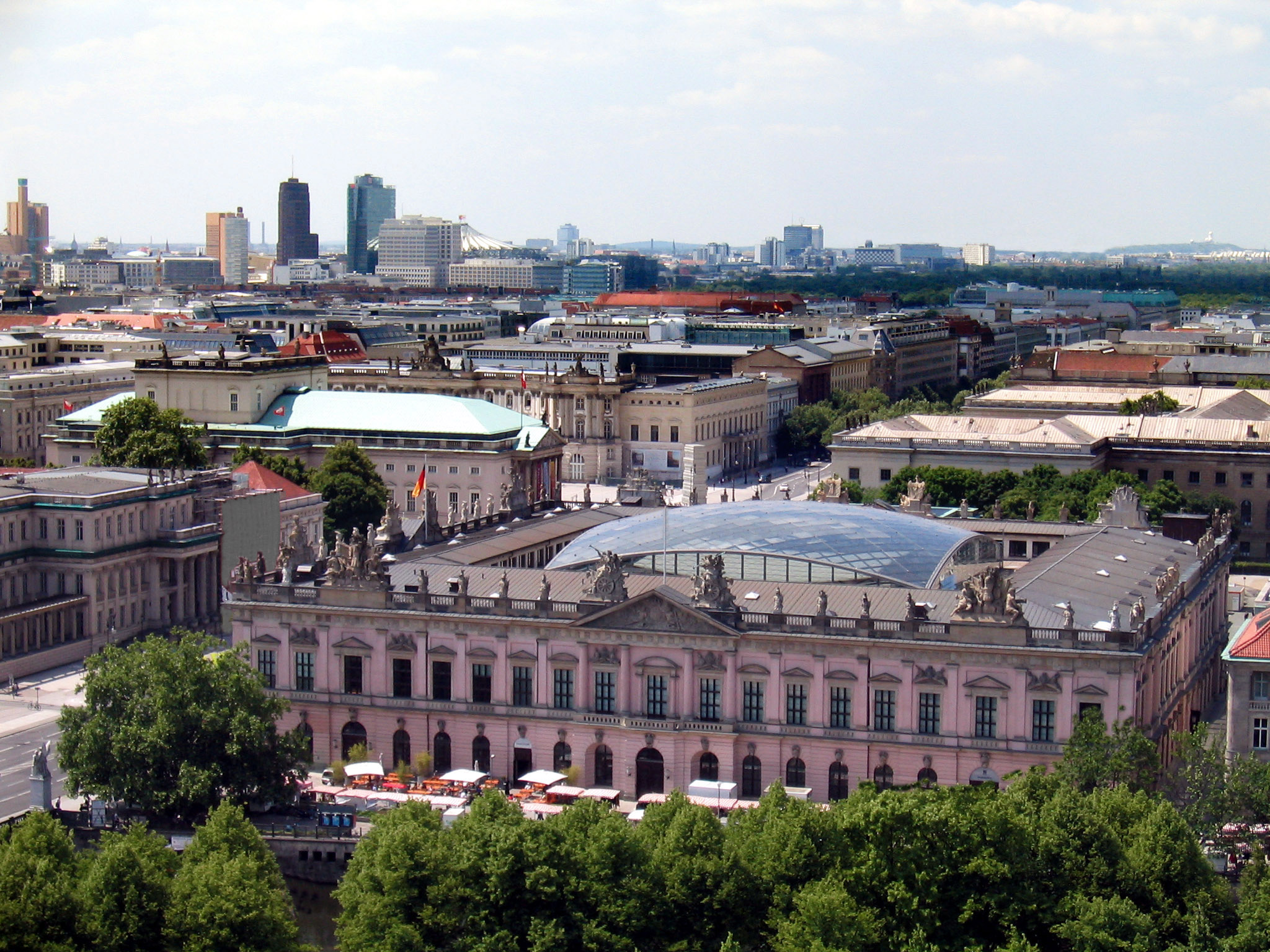
Unter den Linden

Humboldt University of Berlin

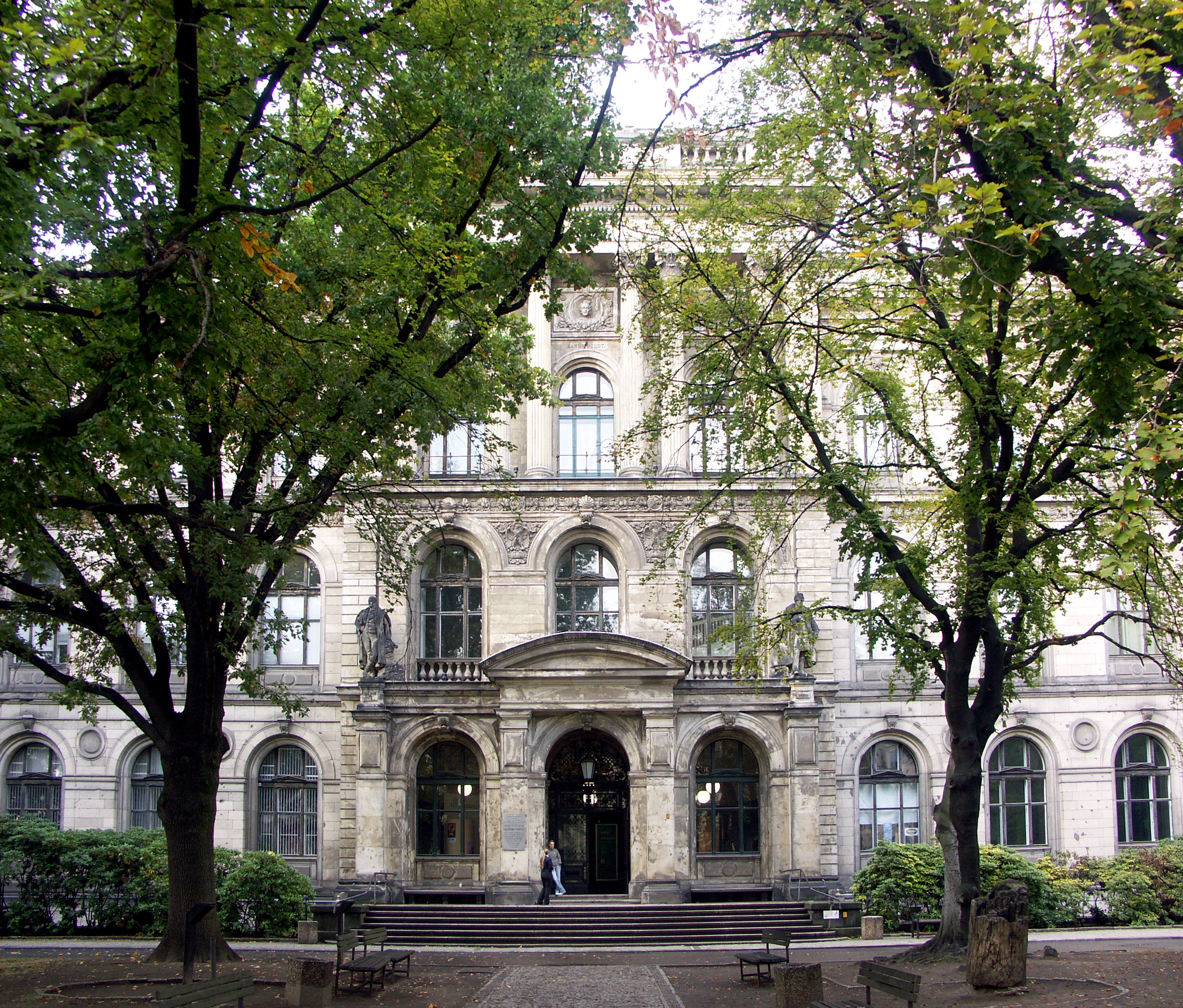
Museum für Naturkunde

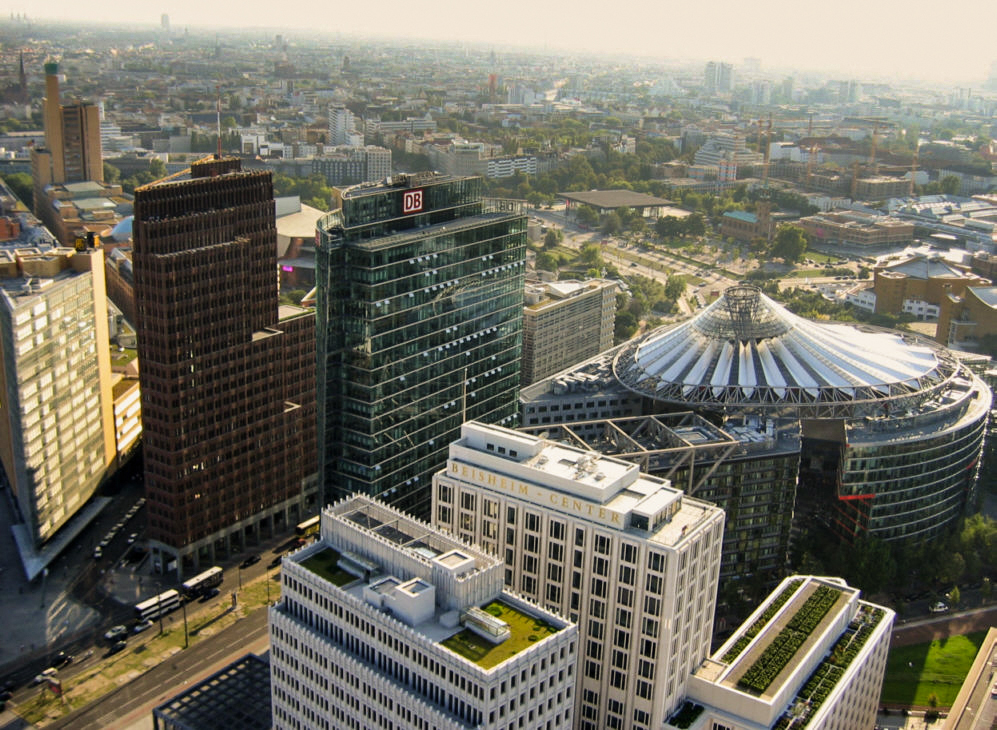
Potsdamer Platz

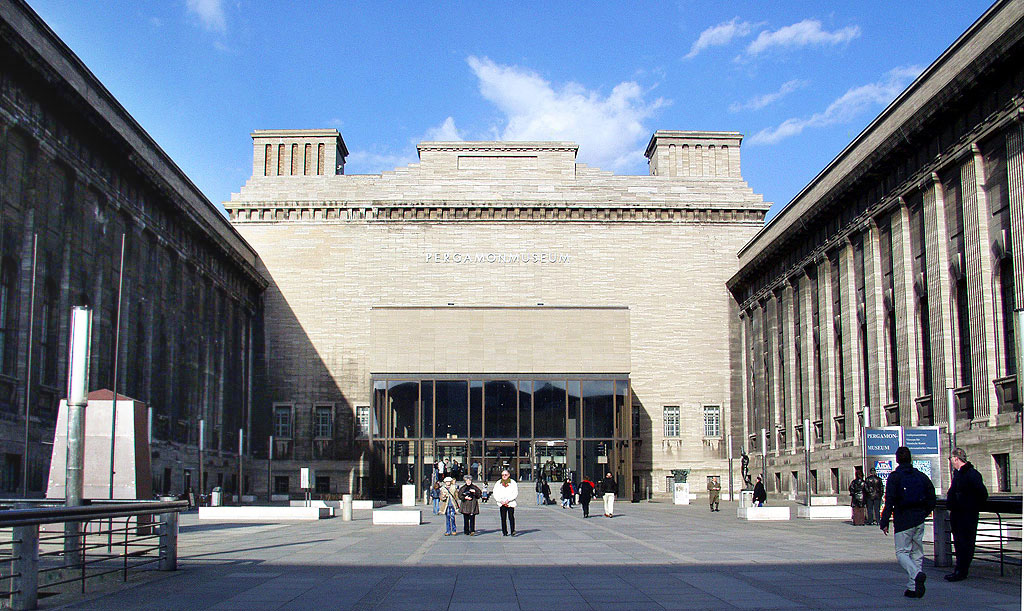
Pergamon Museum

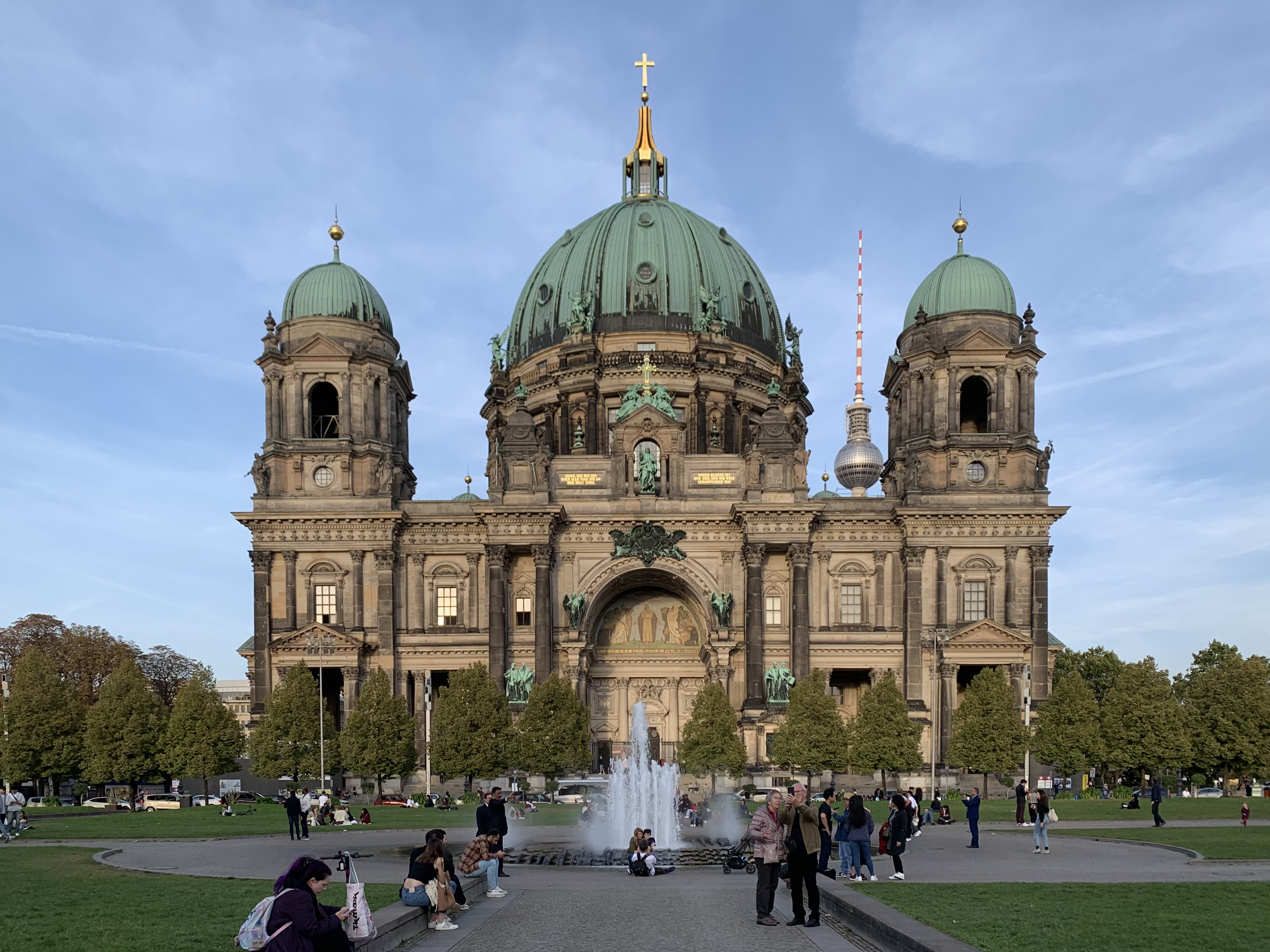
Berlin Cathedral

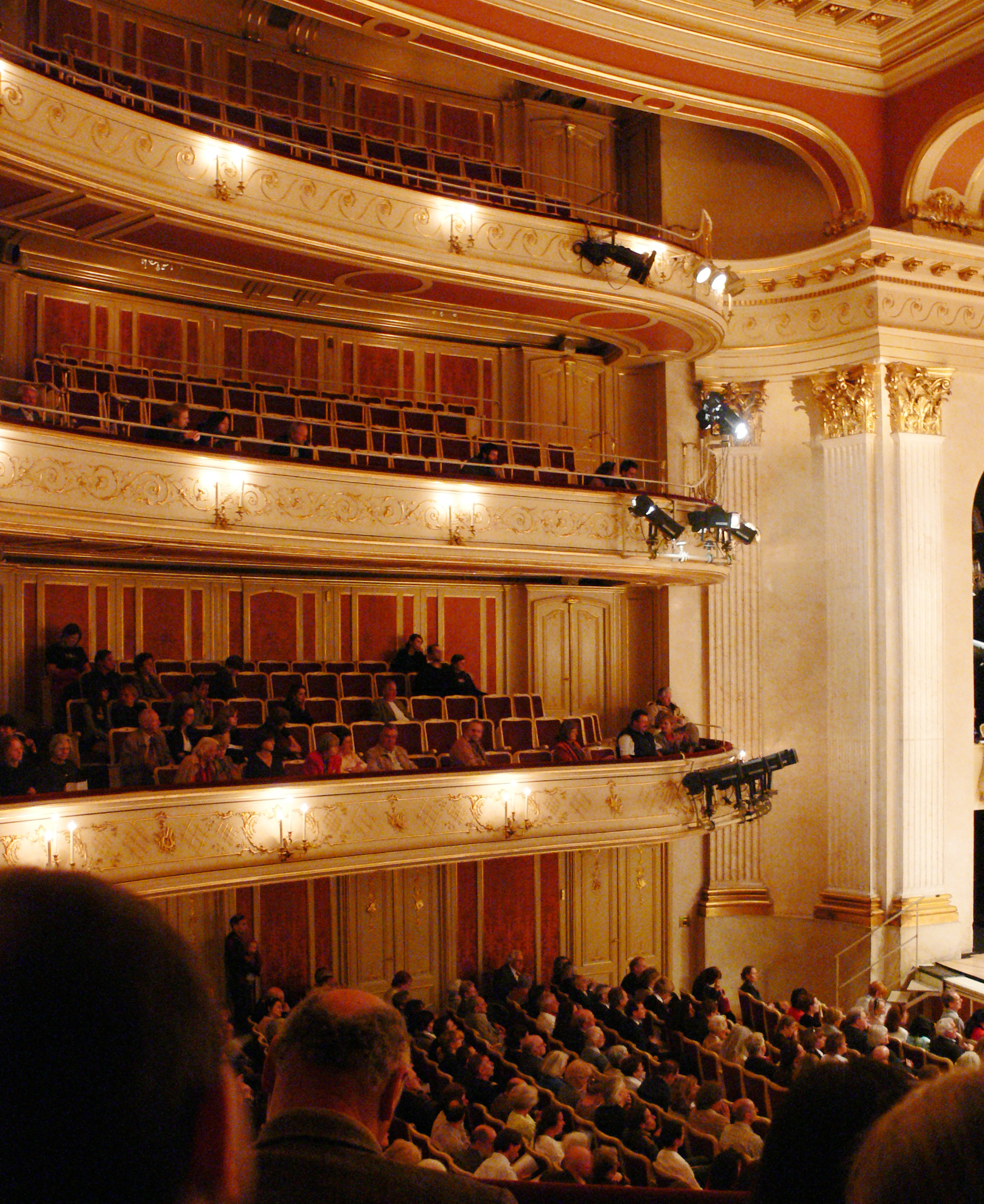
Inside Berlin State Opera

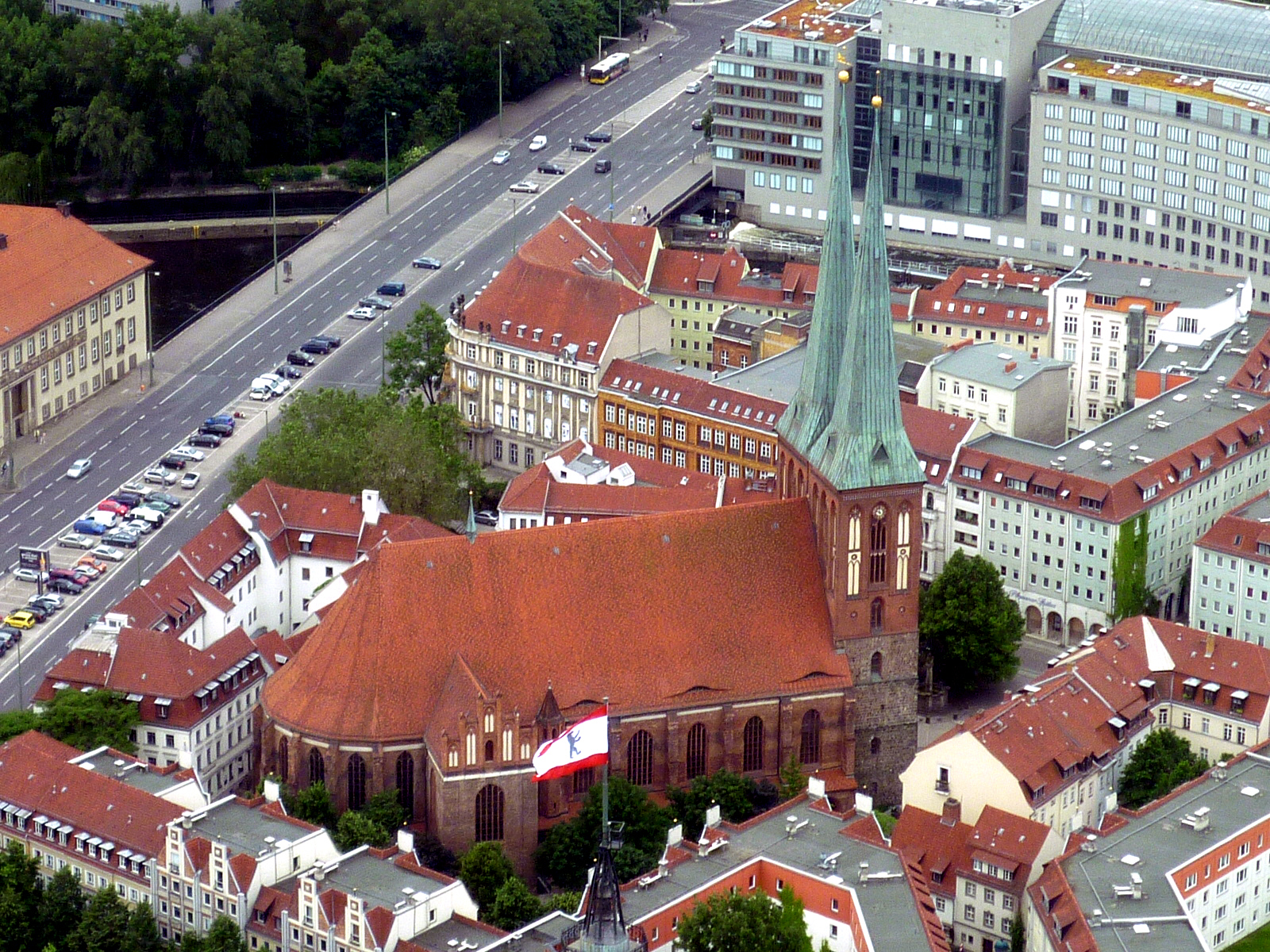
Nikolaikirche

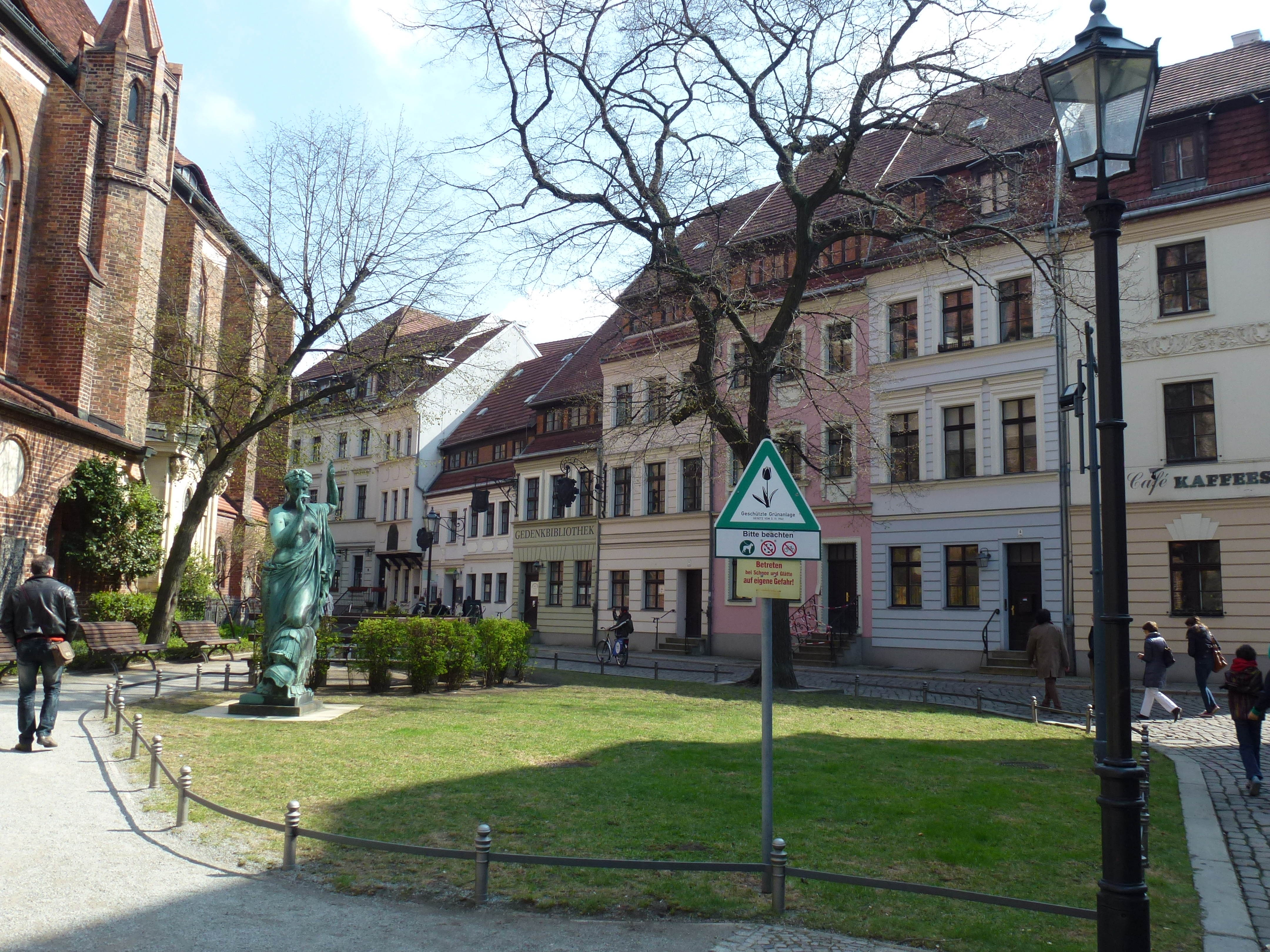
Nikolaiviertel

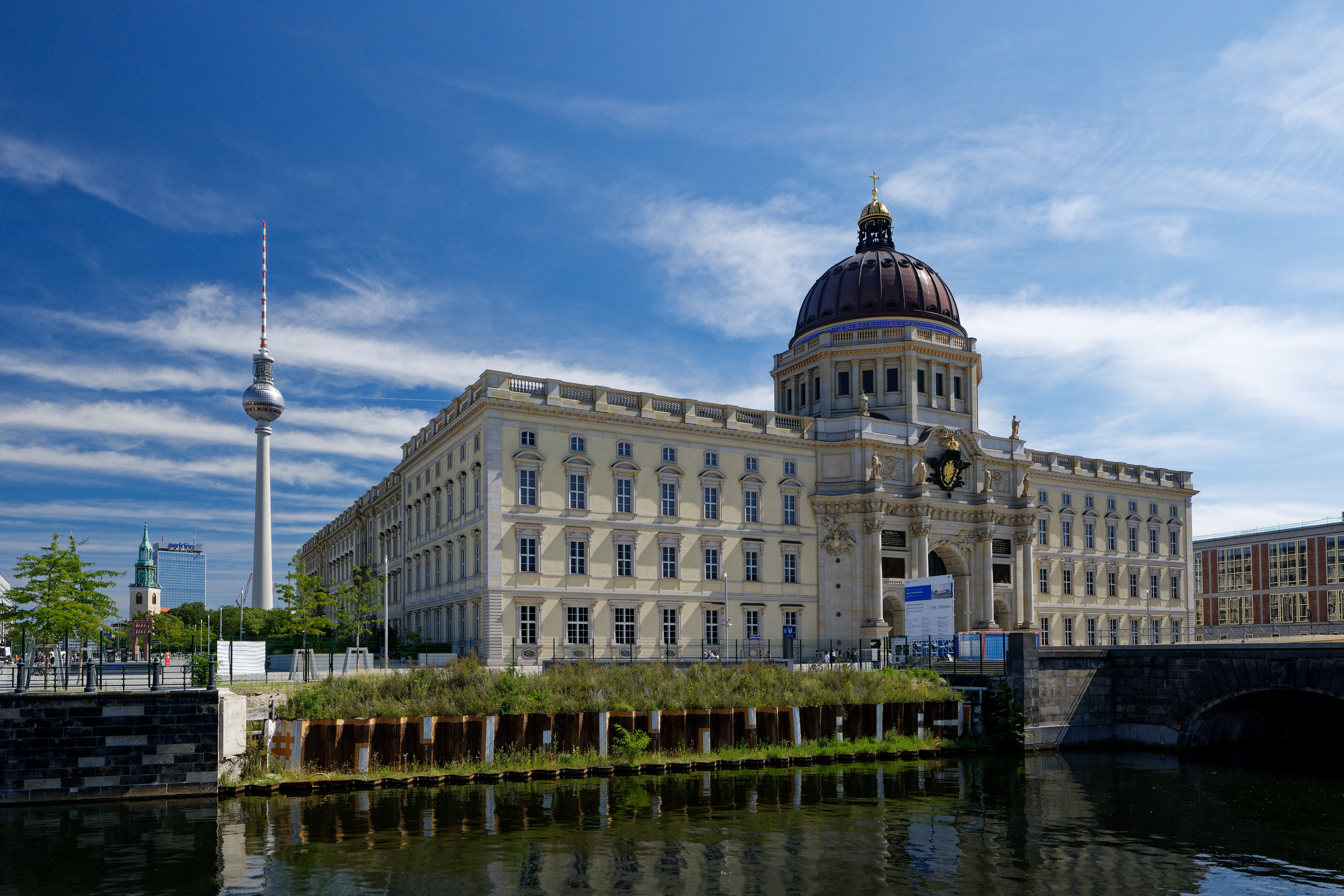
Berlin Palace with the Humboldt Forum

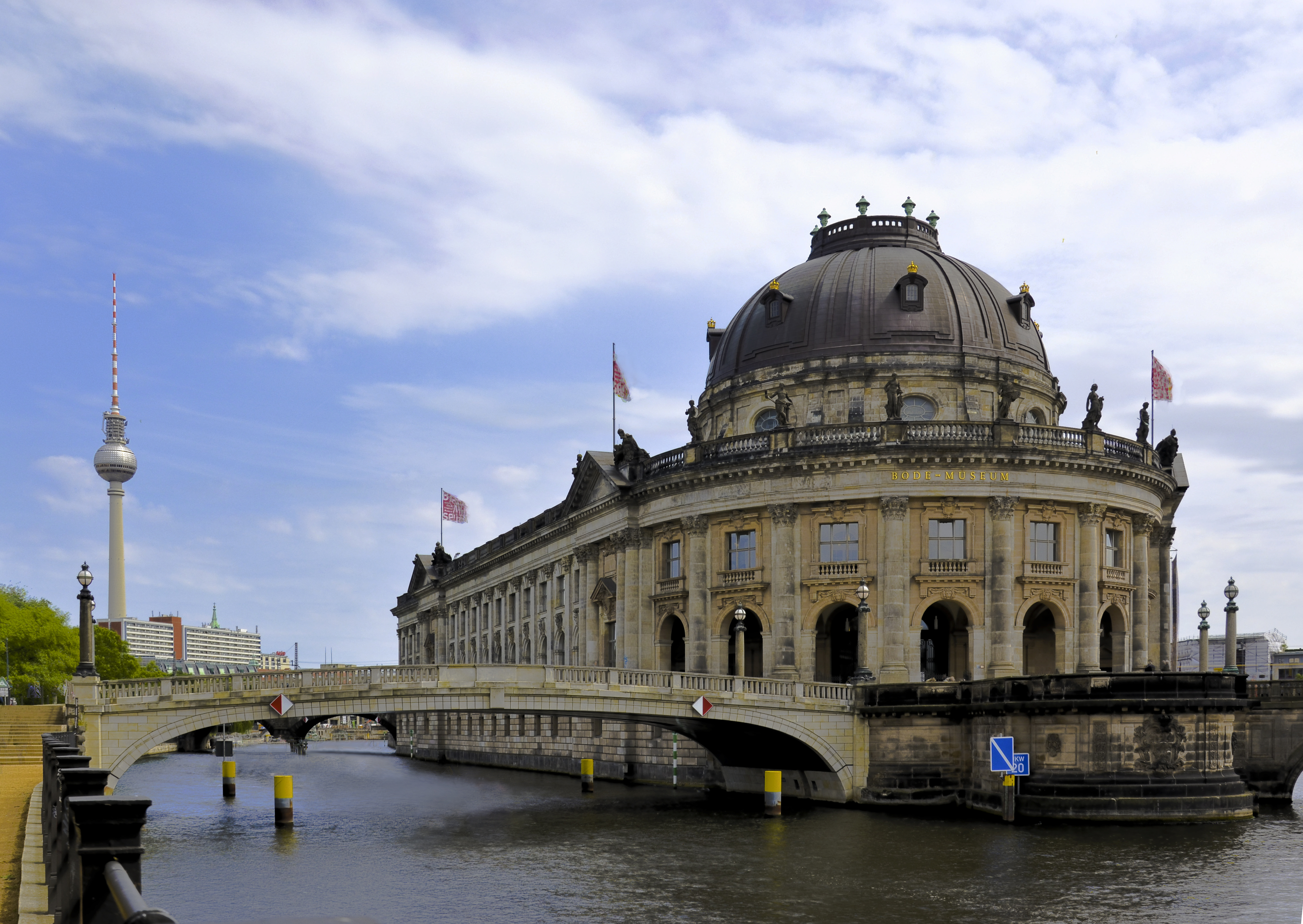
Museum Island

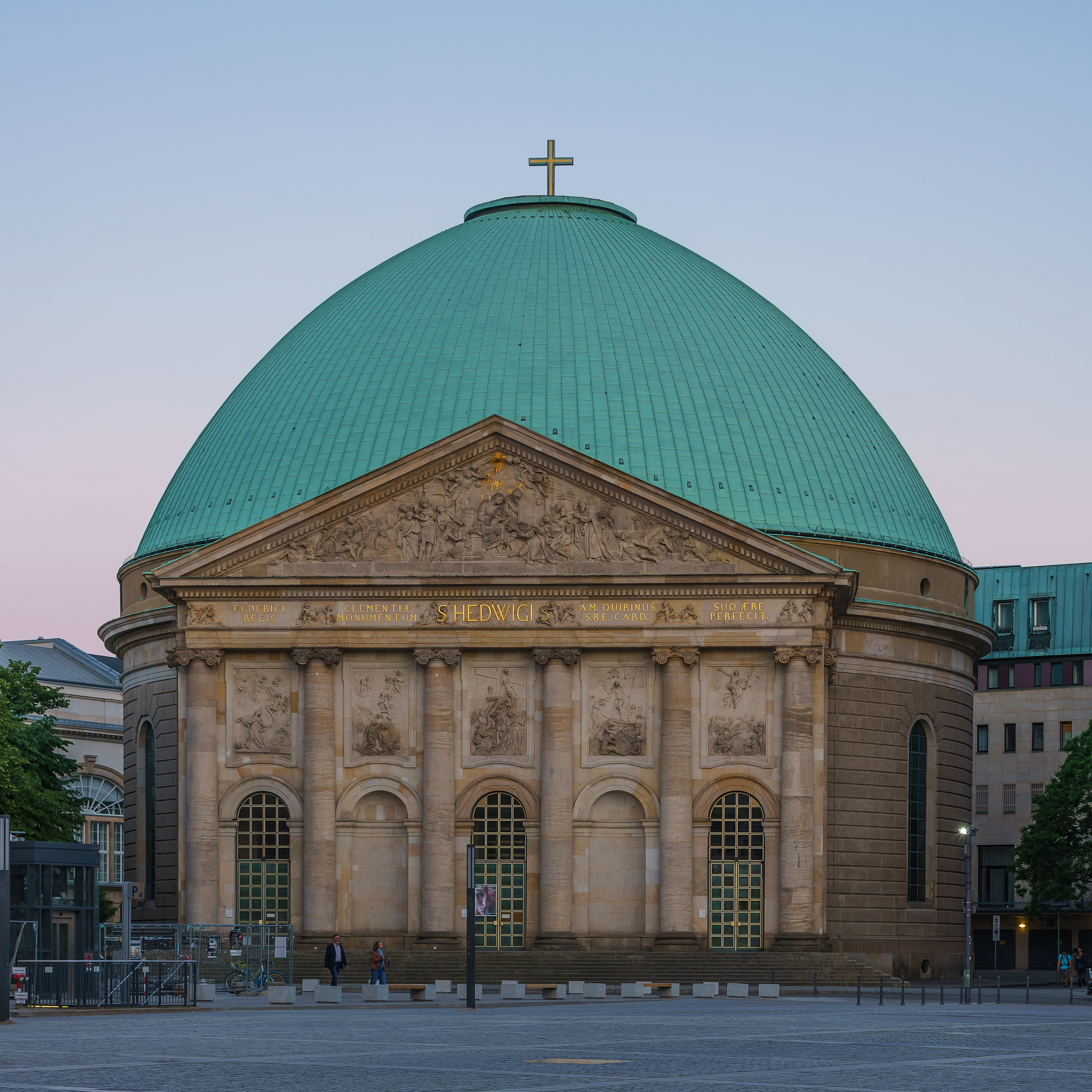
St. Hedwig's Cathedral

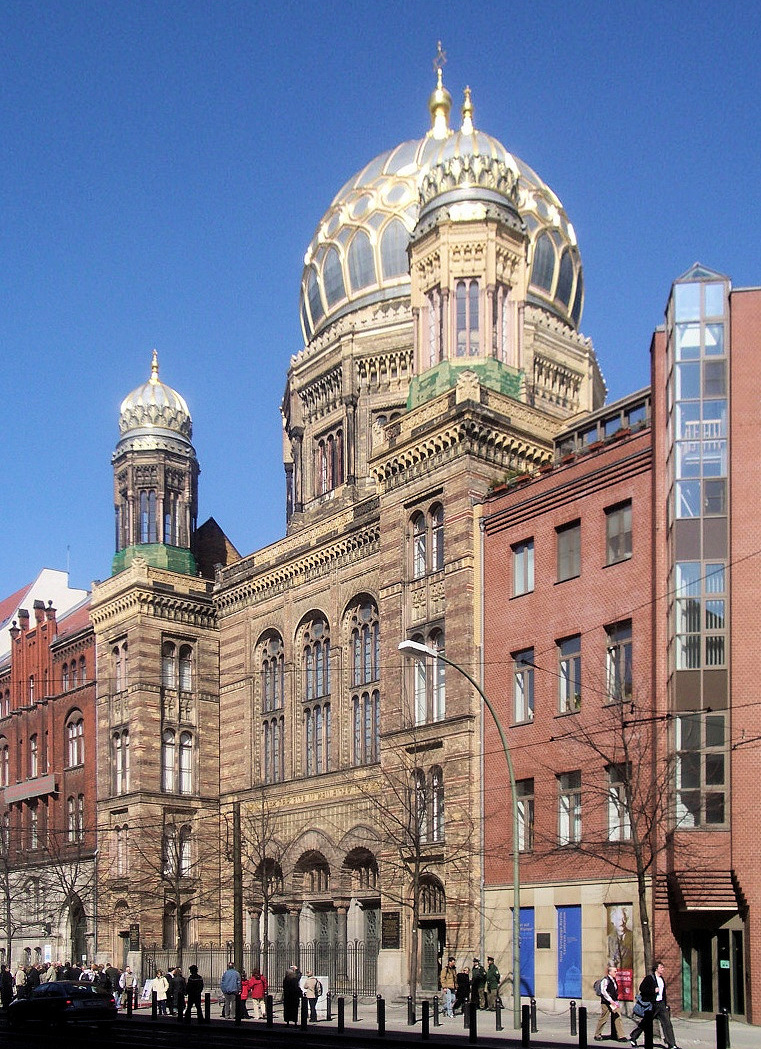
Neue Synagoge

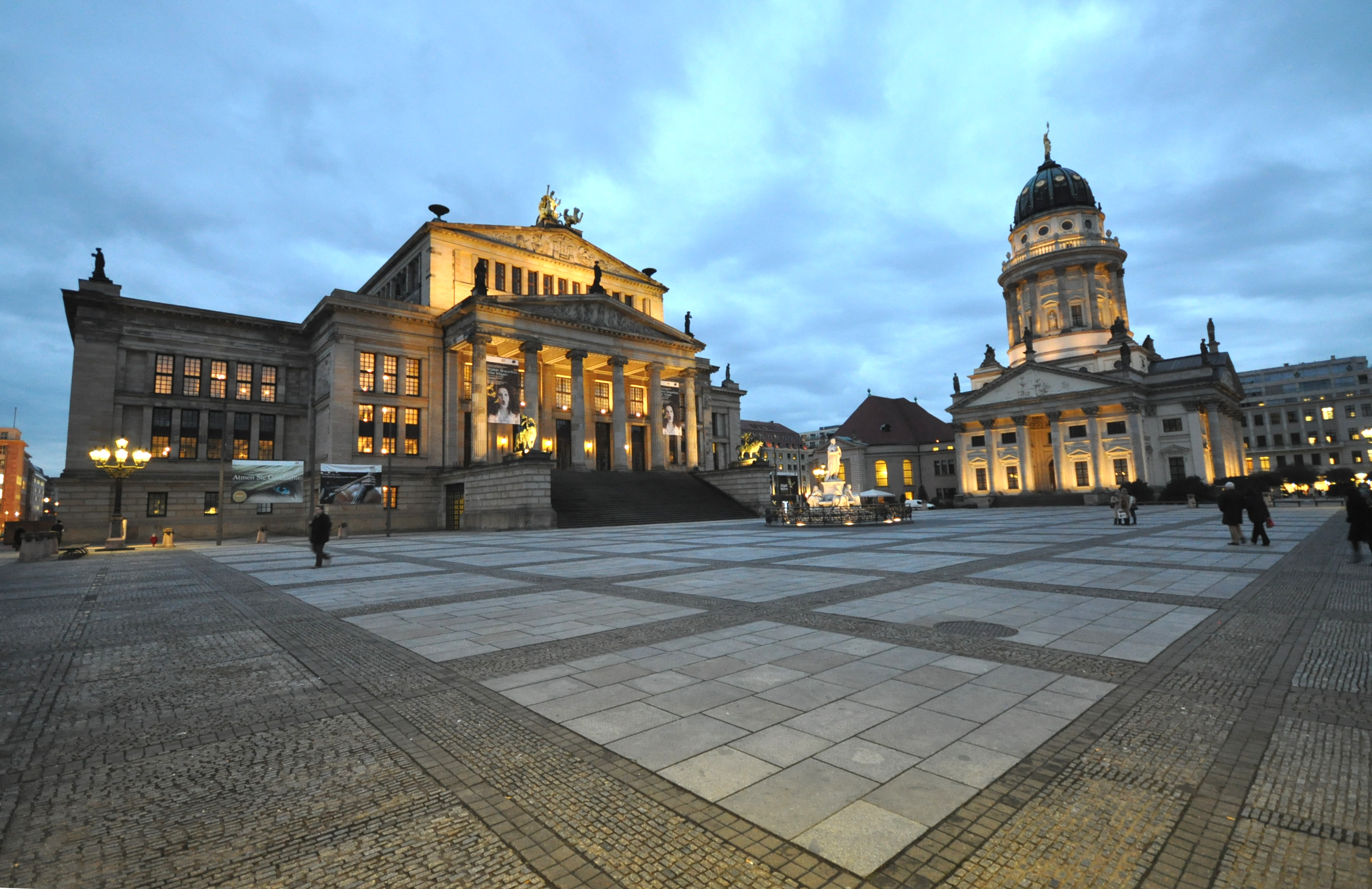
Gendarmenmarkt with Französischer Dom and Konzerthaus

Deutscher Dom

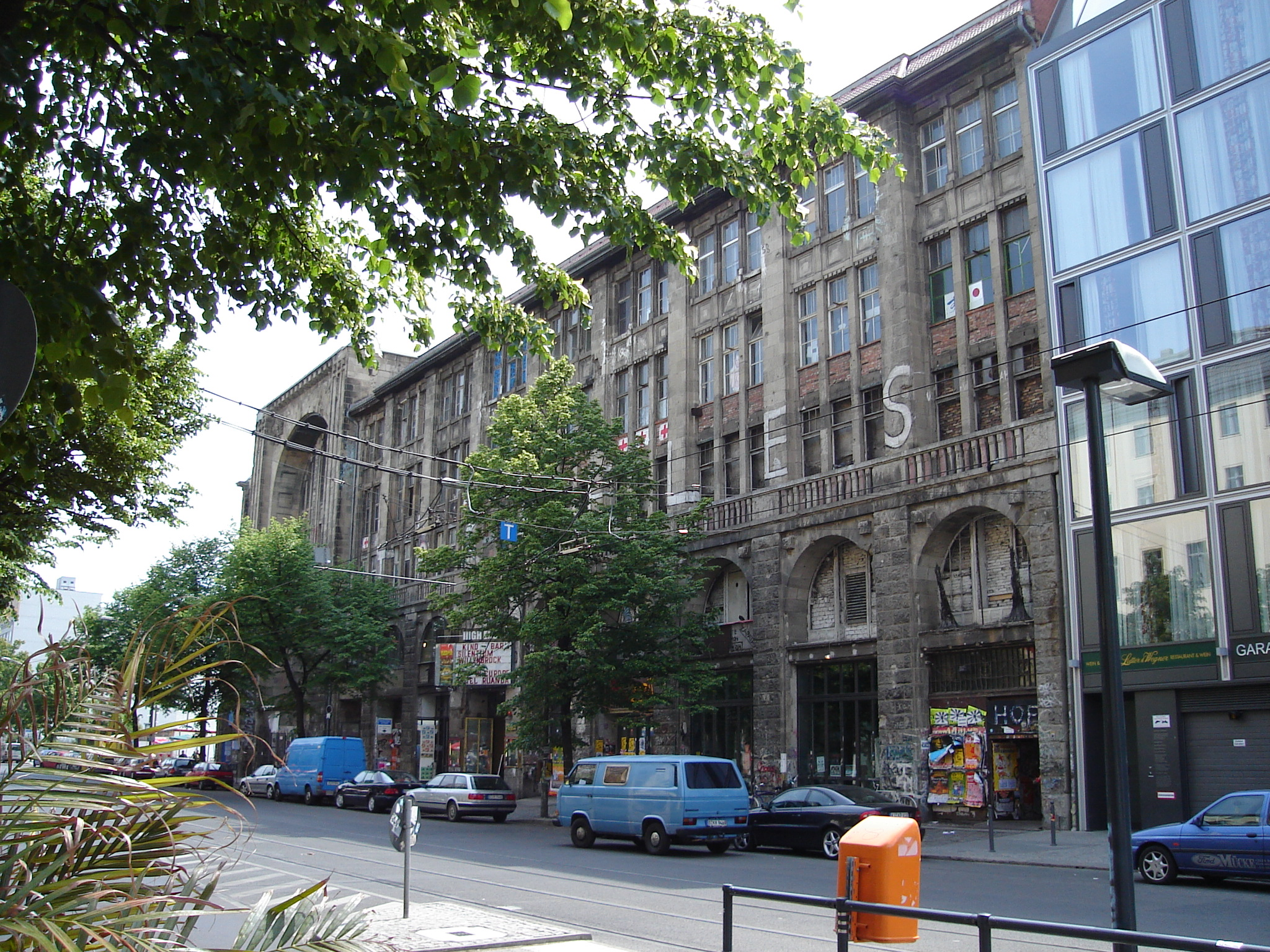
Kunsthaus Tacheles

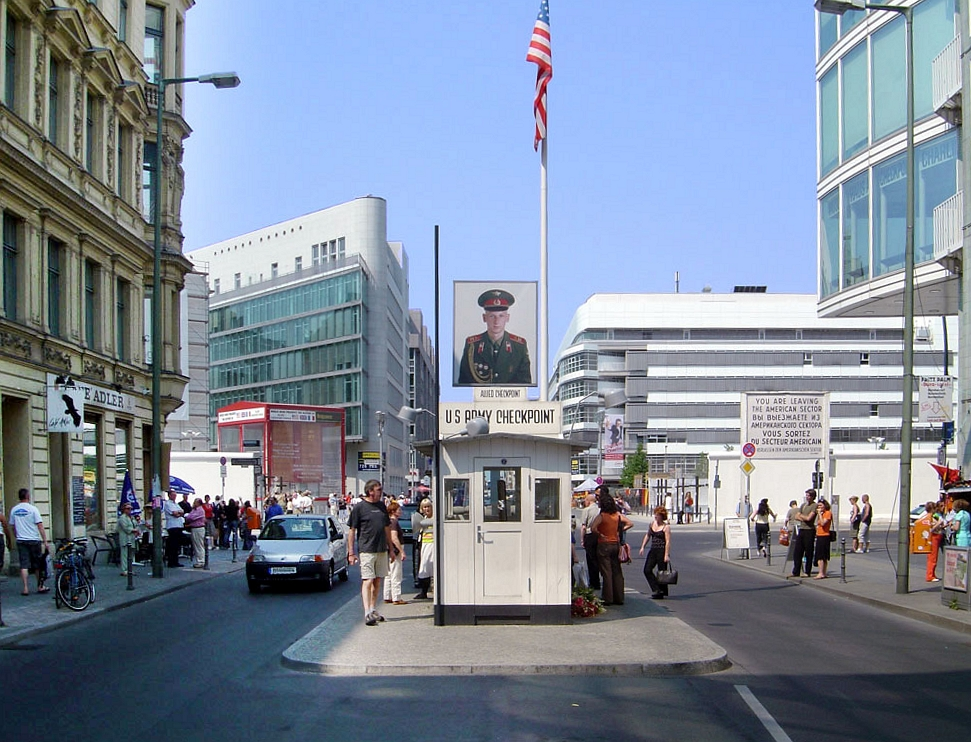
Checkpoint Charlie on Friedrichstrasse

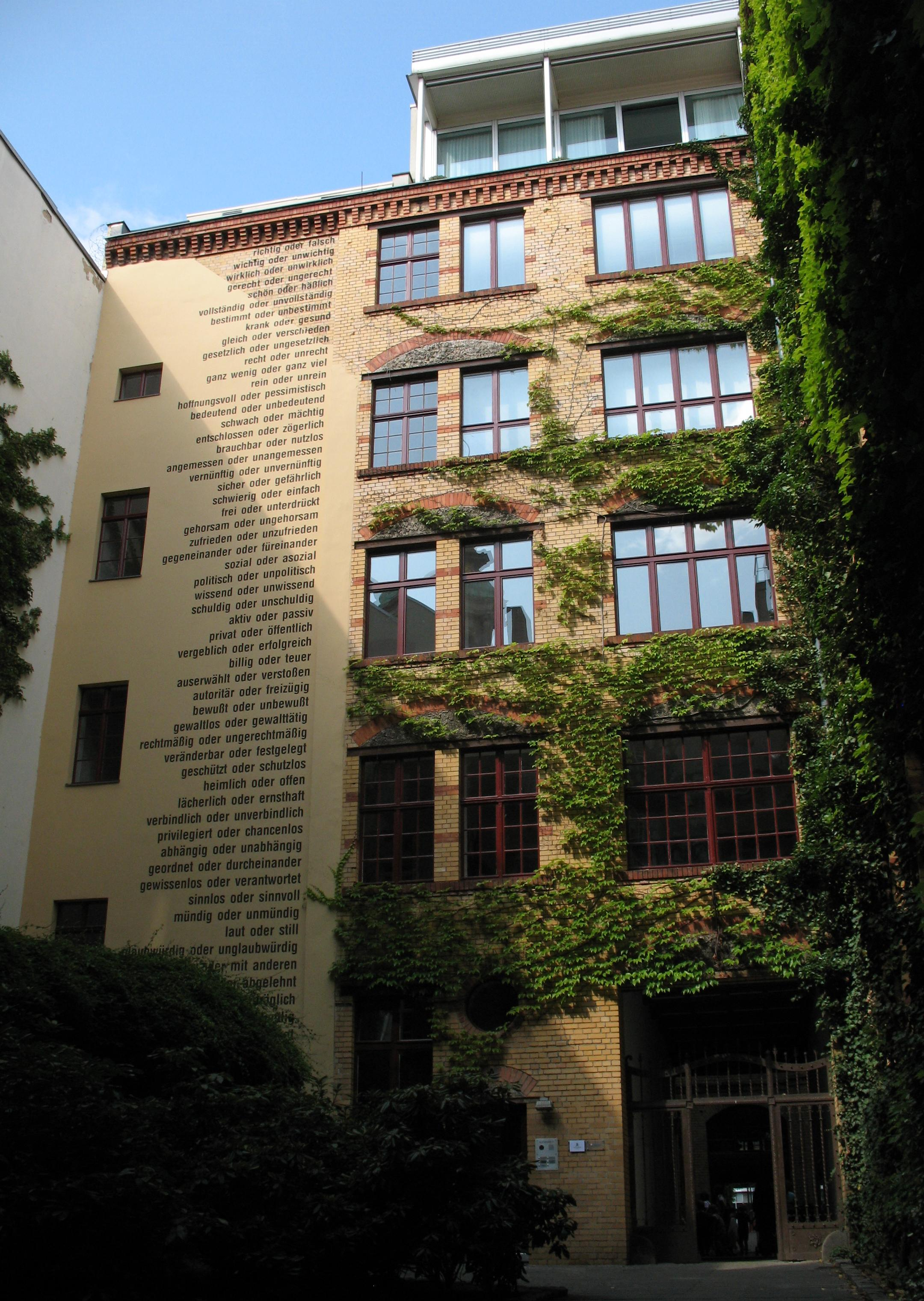
Sophie-Gips-Höfe

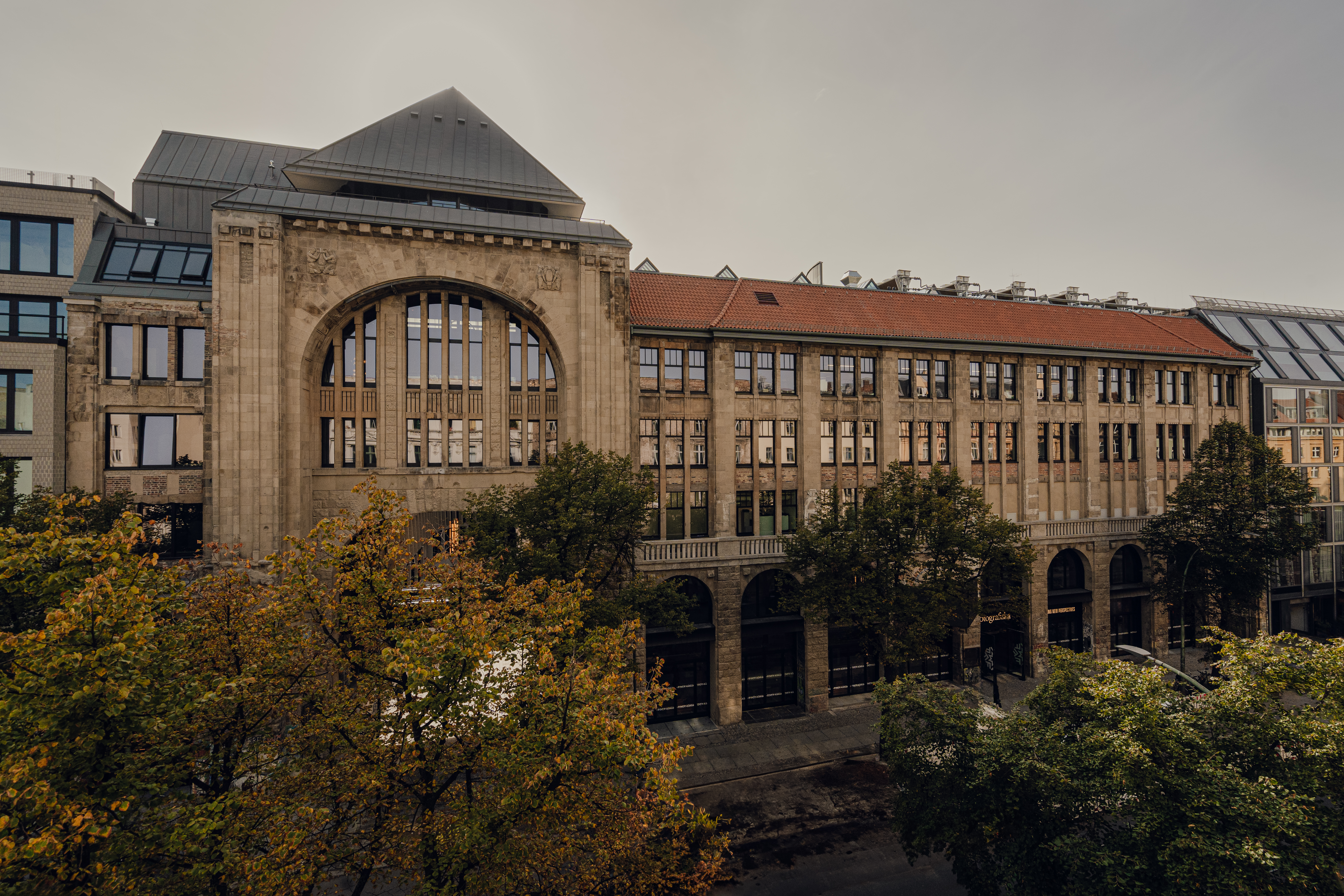
Fotografiska Berlin

== Transportation ==
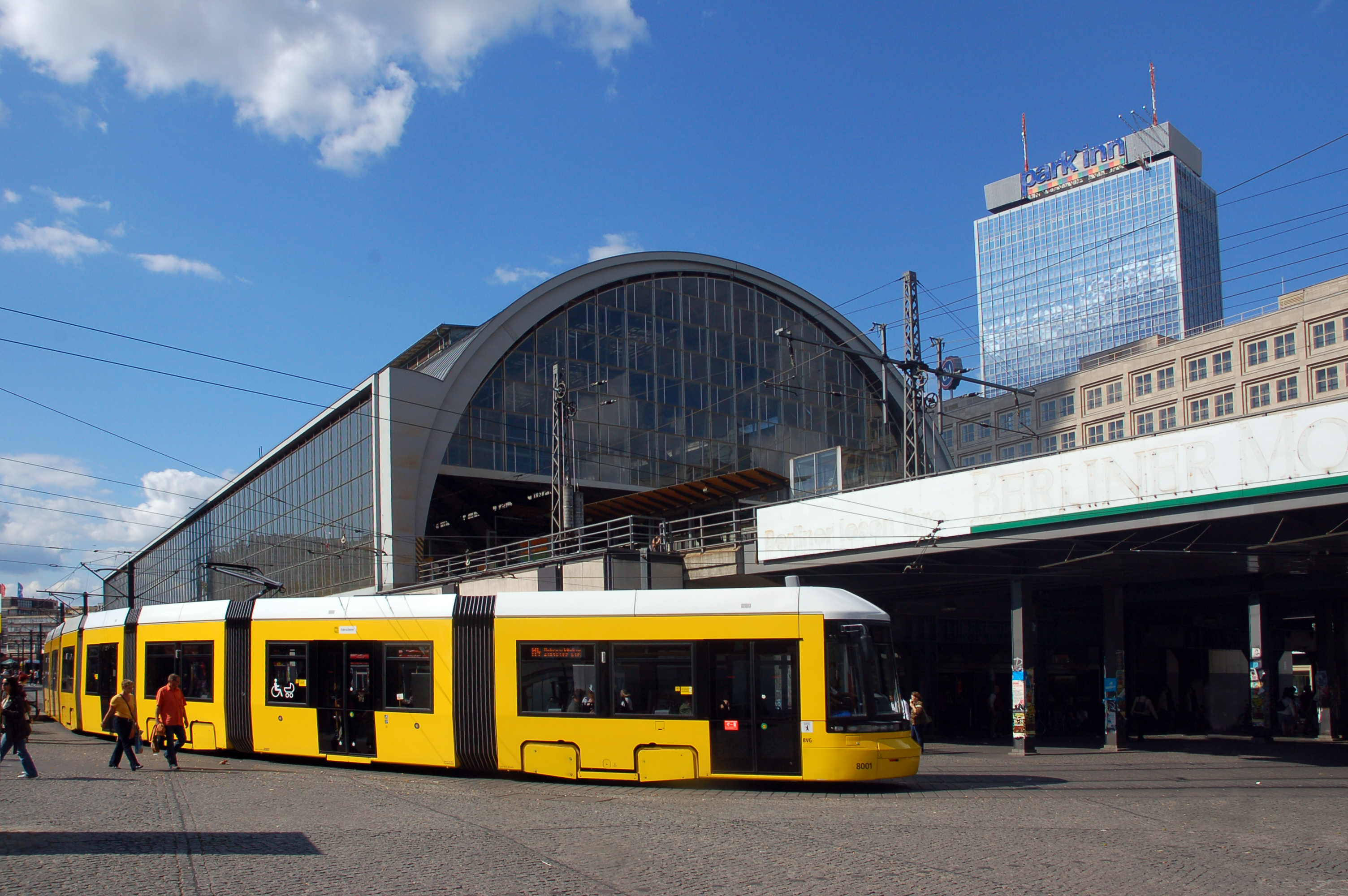
Berlin Alexanderplatz railway station

Mitte is served by S-Bahn lines S5, S7, S75, S9 (both on Berlin Stadtbahn); S1, S2, S25, and U-Bahn lines U2, U5, U6 and U8, as well as numerous tram and bus lines.

== People ==
=== who live(d) in Mitte ===
- Detlef D! Soost, German choreograph
- Lars Eidinger, German actor
- Magda Goebbels, German nazi, died at Wilhelmstraße
- Joseph Goebbels, German nazi politician, died at Wilhelmstraße
- Kate Hall, Danish singer and moderator
- Adolf Hitler, German Nazi politician, died in Berlin-Mitte at Wilhelmstraße
- Christopher Trimmel, Austrian football player
- Claudia Mehnert, German actress
- Marius Müller-Westernhagen, German singer
- Angela Merkel, German chancellor (part of her life)
- Katarina Witt, German icedancer (part of her life)

== See also ==
- Berlin Alexanderplatz railway station
- Berlin Friedrichstrasse railway station
- Berlin Potsdamer Platz railway station
