= Borsig =

Borsig is a surname. Notable people with the surname include:

- Albert Borsig, German industrialist
- Arnold Borsig (1867–1897), German entrepreneur
- August Borsig (1804–1854), German businessman
- Conrad von Borsig (1873–1945), German mechanical engineer
- Ernst Borsig (1869–1933), German industrialist

== Companies ==
- Borsig Group, German process engineering company
