= HSM Oldenbarneveldt - Simon Stevin =

HSM Oldenbarneveldt - Simon Stevin HSM 190 - 193
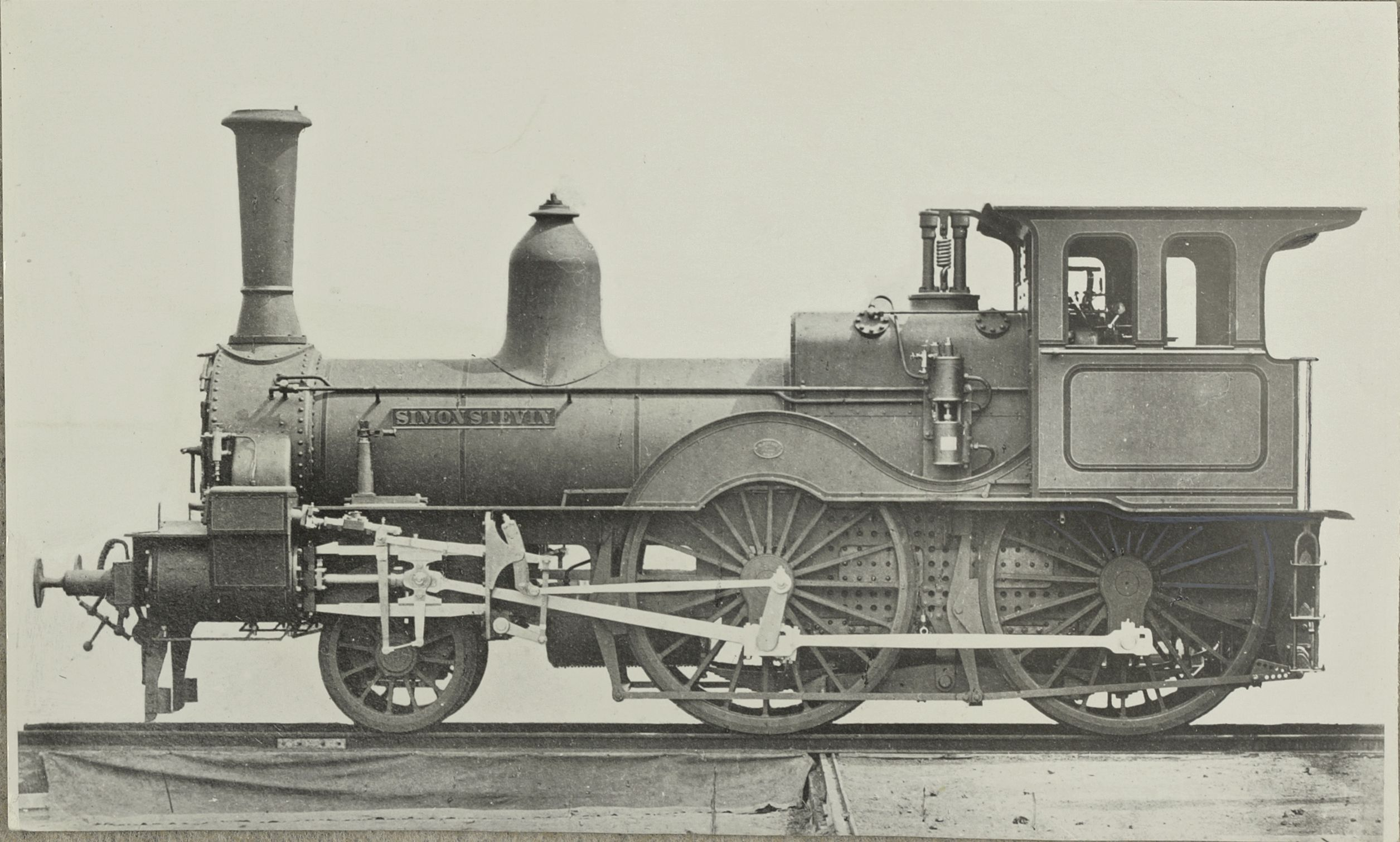
Type and origin
- Power type: Steam
- Builder: Borsig, Berlin-Tegel
- Serial number: 4244–4247
- Build date: 1888
- Total produced: 4
Specifications
- Configuration
  - Whyte: 2-4-0
  - UIC: 1'B
- Gauge: 1,435 mm (4 ft 8 1/2 in)
- Leading dia.: 1,100 mm (3 ft 7 in)
- Driver dia.: 2,140 mm (7 ft 0 in)
- Tender wheels: 1,100 mm (3 ft 7 in)
- Length: 15,316 mm (50 ft 3.0 in)
- Height: 4,400 mm (14 ft 5 in)
- Loco weight: 43.1 t (47.5 short tons; 42.4 long tons)
- Tender weight: 25.7 t (28.3 short tons; 25.3 long tons)
- Fuel type: Coal
- Fuel capacity: 3.6 t (4.0 short tons; 3.5 long tons)
- Water cap.: 9 m^{3} (2,000 imp gal)
- Firebox
  - Type: Belpaire
  - Grate area: 2.09 m^{2} (22.5 sq ft)
- Boiler pressure: 10.3 kg/cm^{2} (147 psi)
- Heating surface
  - Firebox: 9.6 m^{2} (103 sq ft)
  - Tubes: 104 m^{2} (1,120 sq ft)
- Cylinders: Two, outside (compound)
- High-pressure cylinder: 456 mm × 400 mm (18.0 in × 15.7 in)
- Low-pressure cylinder: 456 mm × 800 mm (18.0 in × 31.5 in)
- Valve gear: Walschaerts
- Train heating: Front and rear
- Loco brake: Westinghouse
Performance figures
- Maximum speed: 90 km/h (56 mph)
- Tractive effort: 4,220 kgf (41.4 kN; 9,300 lbf)
Career
- Operators: HSM
- Power class: Till 1899: P^{3} From 1899: P^{2}
- Numbers: 190–193
- Locale: The Netherlands
- Withdrawn: 1908 – 1913
- Disposition: All scrapped

The HSM 190 - 193 were a class of four 1'B (2-4-0) steam locomotives build by Borsig for the Hollandsche Spoorweg Maatschappij in 1888. The locomotives were named as was typical for the HSM. These were of the same type as locomotives of the series 184-189 (later the NS 1100 serie) with the exception that these locomotives were compounds. Compounding was introduced in an effort to improve efficiency.

In 1885, Mr. F.A.A. Middelberg of the HSM ordered a study of coal efficiency improvement by the use of compounding. Four locomotives of the series 184-189, two in freight service and two in passenger service, were converted. The trials were successful The four production machines showed a decrease in coal consumption as well. The reduction in coal usage was around 17%. Still, no further compound locomotives were built for the HSM.

Typically, compounding locomotives use a small-diameter high-pressure cylinder(s) and a large-diameter low-pressure cylinder(s). These locomotives were different: the cylinders had the same bore, but different strokes. The low pressure cylinder's stroke was double the length of the high pressure cylinder's. The cut-off of the cylinders could be independently controlled.

The HSM employed these locomotives from depots in Zutphen and Almelo. In 1908, three locomotives were taken out of service, whilst No. 191 Paulus Potter remained in service until 1913. All locomotives have been scrapped.

== Fleet list ==
Builder Number	Build in	HSM Number	Name	Scrapped	Details
4244	1888	190	Oldenbarneveldt	1908	
4245	1888	191	Paulus Potter	1913	
4246	1888	192	Rembrandt	1908	
4247	1888	193	Simon Stevin	1908	
