= OSAF (disambiguation) =

OSAF is the Open Source Applications Foundation.

OSAF may also refer to:

- Oceania Sailing Federation
- Oberste SA-Führung, the supreme SA leadership during the Third Reich; headquartered in the Borsig Palace
