= Conrad von Borsig =

German entrepreneur (1873-1945)

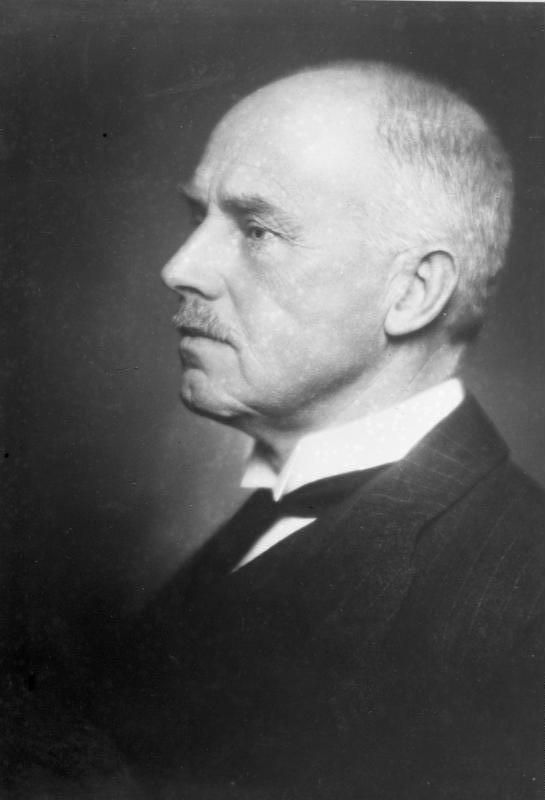
- Born: April 23, 1873; Berlin, Germany
- Died: February 13, 1945 (aged 71); Przelewice, Pyrzyce County, Poland
- Occupation: Entrepreneur
- Relatives: August Borsig (grandfather), Ernst Borsig (brother), Arnold Borsig (brother)

Conrad von Borsig (April 23, 1873, in Berlin – February 13, 1945, in Przelewice, Pyrzyce County) was a co-owner of the German mechanical engineering Borsig company.

== Biography ==
Conrad von Borsig was the son of Albert Borsig and the grandson of August Borsig. His brothers were Ernst and Arnold. Borsig attended the Luisengymnasium in Berlin-Moabit. He then completed a commercial apprenticeship that included both banking and export business. In 1894 he became co-owner and commercial manager of the Borsig company. He was also a member of the Central Committee of the Reichsbank.

== Ennoblement ==
Conrad Borsig and his brother Ernst were elevated to the Prussian nobility in 1909, becoming "von Borsig".

== Business and public roles ==
Von Borsig held an honorary doctorate from the Technische Hochschule Aachen, awarded in 1923. He served as chairman of the employers' association of the German professional trade associations (Arbeitgeberverband der Deutschen Berufsgenossenschaften) and of the German-Argentine Central Association (Deutsch-Argentinischer Zentralverband), in addition to his membership on the Central Committee of the Reichsbank

== Literature ==
- Munzinger: International Biographical Archive. 01/1948 of December 22, 1947.
- Hubertus Neuschäffer: Castles and mansions in Western Pomerania. Commission publisher Gerhard Rautenberg, Leer 1994, ISBN 3-7921-0534-9 , p. 184.
- Eckhard Hansen, Florian Tennstedt (Eds.) U. a .: Biographical lexicon on the history of German social policy from 1871 to 1945 . Volume 2: Social politicians in the Weimar Republic and during National Socialism 1919 to 1945. Kassel University Press, Kassel 2018, ISBN 978-3-7376-0474-1 , p. 16 f. ( Online, PDF; 3.9 MB).
