= Wilhelmstrasse =

Major thoroughfare in Berlin, Germany

Wilhelmstraße
- Wilhelmstrasse
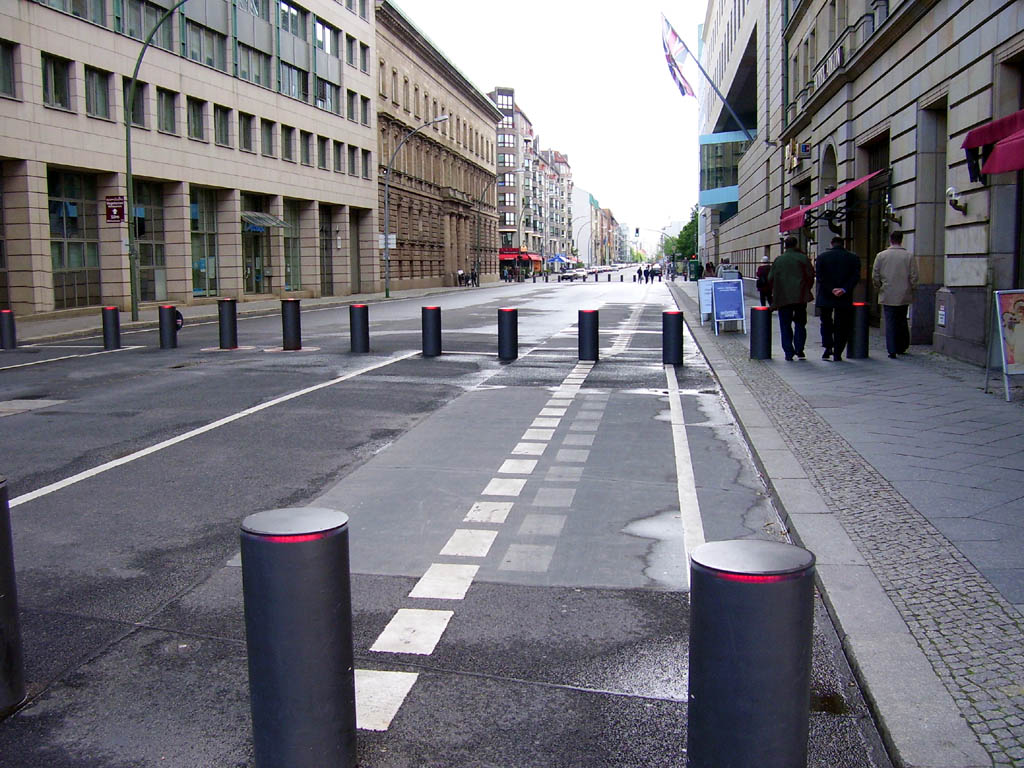
- Wilhelmstraße today: anti-car bomb bollards at the British embassy
- Interactive map of Wilhelmstraße
- Former names: Central and southern parts: Husarenstraße; (after 1731–1740); Wilhelmstraße; (1740–1964); Northern part: Neue Wilhelmstraße; (1822–1964); Northern and central parts: Otto-Grotewohl-Straße; (1964–1993); Southern part: Wilhelmstraße; (1964–1993); Northern and central parts: Toleranzstraße; (1991, not implemented)
- Namesake: Frederick William I of Prussia
- Type: Street
- Length: 2,400 m (7,900 ft)
- Location: Berlin, Germany
- Quarter: Mitte, Kreuzberg
- Nearest metro station: Brandenburger Tor; Mohrenstraße; Anhalter Bahnhof; Möckernbrücke; Hallesches Tor
- Coordinates: 52°30′29″N 13°22′39″E
- North end: Luisenstraße; Marschall Bridge; Reichstagufer
- Major junctions: Dorotheenstraße; Unter den Linden; Behrenstraße; Hannah-Arendt-Straße; Französische Straße; Mohrenstraße; Voßstraße; Leipziger Straße; Niederkirchnerstraße; Zimmerstraße; Kochstraße; Anhalter Straße; Puttkamerstraße; Hedemannstraße; Franz-Klühs-Straße; Stresemannstraße
- South end: Hallesches Ufer; Mehring Bridge; Mehringdamm

Construction
- Inauguration: After 1731

Wilhelmstraße, or Wilhelmstrasse (see ß; German pronunciation: [ˈvɪlhɛlmˌʃtʁaːsə]; transl. William Street) is a major thoroughfare in the central Mitte and Kreuzberg districts of Berlin, Germany. Until 1945, it was recognised as the centre of the government, first of the Kingdom of Prussia, and later of the unified German Reich, housing in particular the Reich Chancellery and the Foreign Office. The street's name was thus also frequently used as a metonym for overall German governmental administration: much as the term "Whitehall" is often used to signify the British governmental administration as a whole. In English, "the Wilhelmstrasse" usually referred to the German Foreign Office.

== Course ==
The Wilhelmstraße runs south from the Spree riverside through the historic Dorotheenstadt quarter to the Unter den Linden boulevard near Pariser Platz and Brandenburg Gate, where it takes on a line slightly east of south through adjacent Friedrichstadt, until its juncture with Stresemannstraße near Hallesches Tor in Kreuzberg, an overall distance of about 2.4 km (1.5 mi).

Further south of Unter den Linden it passes the nowadays built-over former Wilhelmplatz vis-à-vis Voss-Straße, it crosses Leipziger Straße near Leipziger and Potsdamer Platz, and Niederkirchnerstraße, known until after World War II as Prinz-Albrecht-Straße. At its southern end, Wilhelmstraße originally met with Friedrichstraße, which runs roughly parallel to the east, on the Belle-Alliance circus, before the street course was westerly redirected to the Stresemannstraße junction about 1970.

Between Unter den Linden and parallel Behrenstraße, the road is closed for motor vehicles as a protection of the Embassy of the United Kingdom.

== History ==
Frederick William I, from 1713 King in Prussia and Elector of Brandenburg, had the southwestern Friedrichstadt quarter of his Berlin residence significantly enlarged, whereby the premises up to the Berlin Customs Wall (on present-day Stresemannstrasse) were developed as an affluent residential area. In 1731 the Husarenstraße (Street of the Hussars) was built as a north-south thoroughfare of the Baroque city layout, where many Huguenots, who had fled from France, as well as expelled members of the Moravian Church settled. Several personal confidants of the king had large city palaces erected, most notably General Kurt Christoph Graf von Schwerin and the French Baron François Mathieu Vernezobre de Laurieux, who took his residence in the later Prinz-Albrecht-Palais. The street was renamed Wilhelmstraße in honour of the king, who had died in 1740.

=== Government district ===
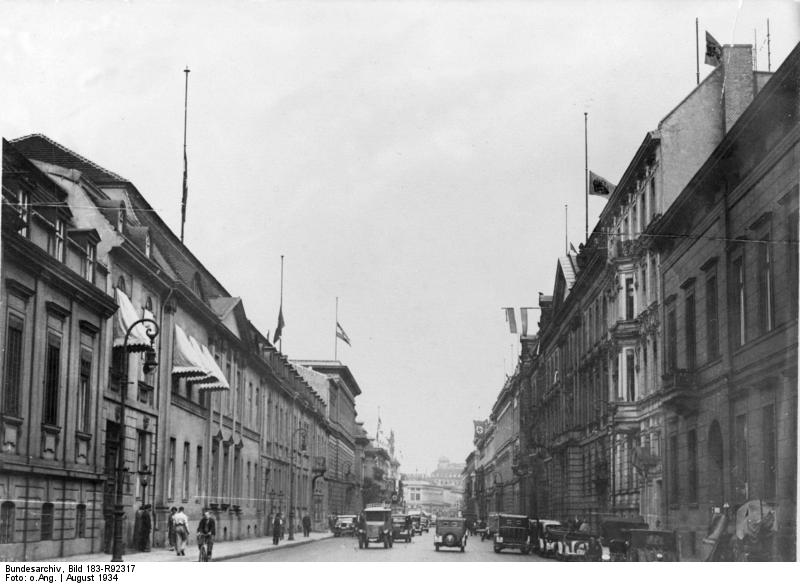
Wilhelmstraße in 1934, Reich Chancellery and Foreign Office on the left

Originally a wealthy residential street, with a number of palaces belonging to members of the Hohenzollern royal family, the Wilhelmstrasse developed as a Prussian government precinct from the mid 19th century. In 1858 King Frederick William IV acquired the former Palais Schwerin on No. 73. This building now called Palace of the Reich President housed an administrative seat of the Prussian minister for the Royal Household, from 1861 led by Alexander von Schleinitz. In 1869 the nearby Palais Schulenburg residence of late Prince Antoni Radziwiłł, built in 1738/39 on No. 77, was purchased by the Prussian state government at the behest of Schleinitz' opponent Minister-President Otto von Bismarck. Rebuilt from 1875 until 1878, it served as his official seat as German chancellor. Congress of Berlin in 1878 and Berlin Conference in 1884/1885 took there place. The next door building on No. 76 was used for the chancellery's Foreign Office department.

Several further governmental departments took their seat on Wilhelmstrasse, such as the Reich Ministry of Finance (No. 61), the Imperial Colonial Office (No. 62), the Prussian state ministry (No. 63), the Reich Ministry of Food and Agriculture (No. 72), and the Reich Ministry of Transport (No. 79, from 1919). The lavish Palais Strousberg of bankrupt "railway king" Bethel Henry Strousberg on No. 70 was bought by Prince Hugo of Hohenlohe in an 1876 auction and rented out to the British ambassador Lord Ampthill, until it was finally purchased by the United Kingdom in 1884. In 1877 the Borsig Palace was erected on the corner with Voss-Strasse.

=== Weimar Republic and Nazi years ===
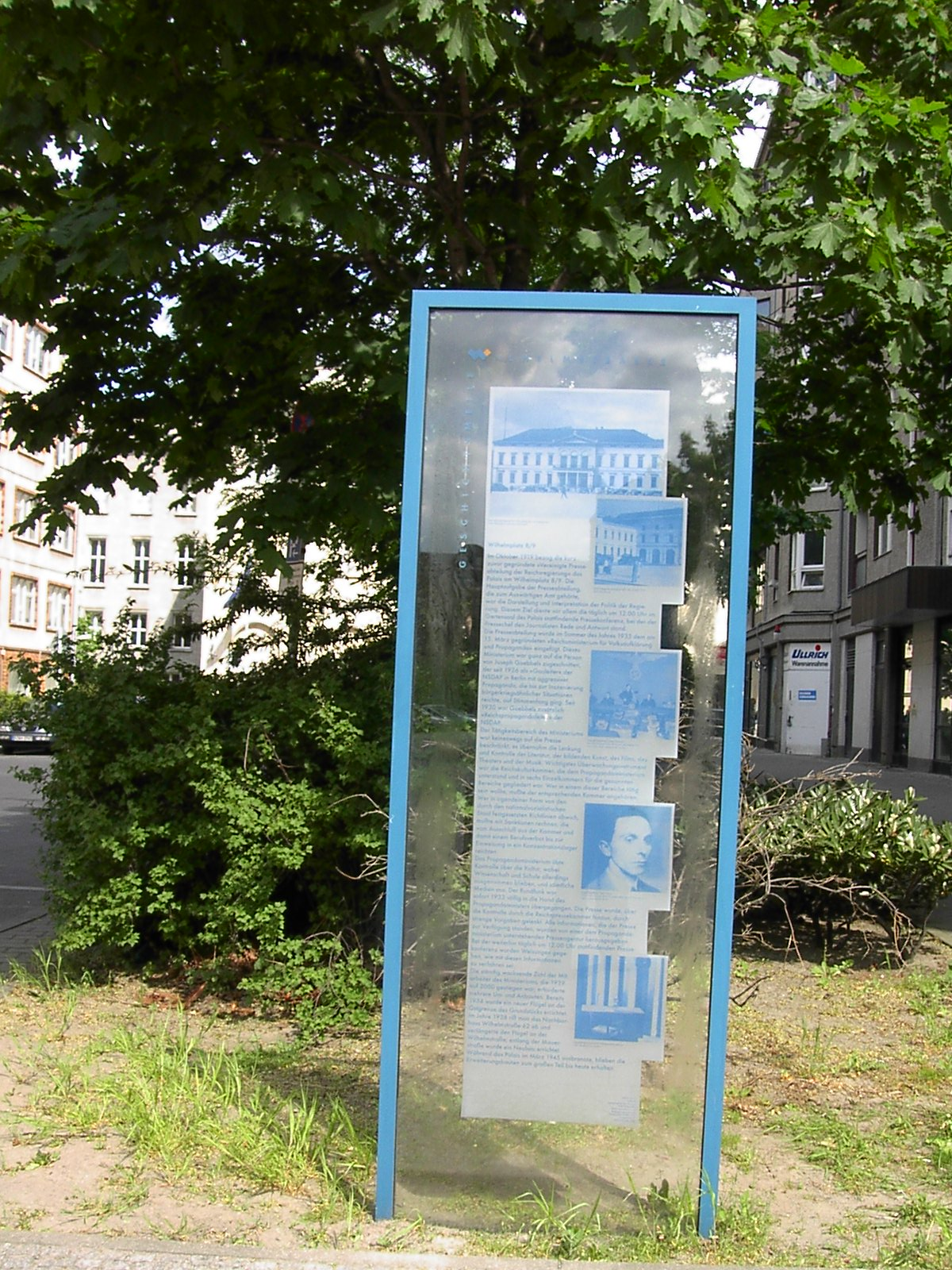
The site of the Propaganda Ministry building at Wilhelmstraße 8. Joseph Goebbels can be seen on the historical marker.

After World War I the Palais Schwerin was sold by exiled Emperor Wilhelm II to the Weimar Republic government and in 1919 became the residence of the first Reich President of Germany, Friedrich Ebert. Until the death of his successor Paul von Hindenburg in 1934, the President's official residence was at Wilhelmstraße 73, where he could watch the torchlight parade on the night of the Nazi Machtergreifung on 30 January 1933, after he had sworn in Adolf Hitler as German chancellor. Hitler addressed the cheering crowds on Wilhelmstrasse from a window of a modern chancellery annex building erected in 1930. Styling himself "Führer and Reich Chancellor" from 1934, he regarded the residence inadequate and ordered the construction of the vast New Reich Chancellery according to plans designed by Albert Speer. This building, a prime example of Nazi architecture, stood immediately south of the old Chancellery, on the corner of the Wilhelmstrasse and the Voss Strasse, and its official address was Voßstraße 4.

The Foreign Office moved into the former Reich President's palace, the old building being refurbished in grandiose style at the behest of Nazi Minister Joachim von Ribbentrop. Vis-à-vis on Wilhelmplatz, the Baroque Ordenspalais was refurbished as seat of the Ministry of Public Enlightenment and Propaganda led by Joseph Goebbels. In 1935/36 his party fellow Hermann Göring had the huge Ministry of Aviation edifice designed by Ernst Sagebiel built on the corner with Leipziger Strasse. The adjacent Prinz-Albrecht-Palais in the south became notorious as the seat of the Sicherheitsdienst of the Reichsführer-SS and the Sicherheitspolizei chief-of-staff; merged into the SS-Reichssicherheitshauptamt terror complex under Reinhard Heydrich in 1939. Most of the public buildings along Wilhelmstrasse were destroyed by Allied bombing during 1944 and early 1945 and during the following Battle of Berlin.

=== Cold War ===
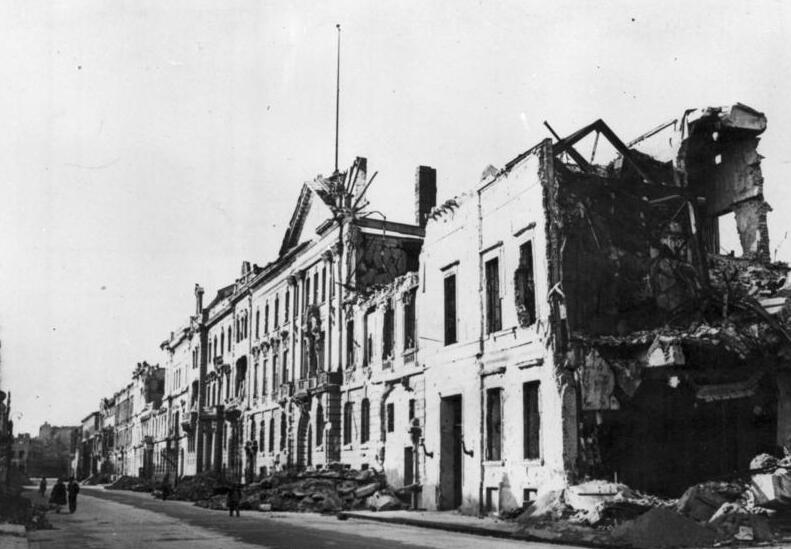
Demolished Wilhelmstraße, 1946

After the war, Wilhelmstrasse as far south as Niederkirchnerstrasse was in the Soviet sector of Allied-occupied Berlin, and apart from clearing the rubble from the street little was done to reconstruct the area until the founding of the German Democratic Republic (GDR) in 1949, with East Berlin as its capital. One of the earliest reconstructions was the 1948-built provisional wooden church hall of the Moravian Brethren congregation on Wilhelmstrasse 138.

The communist GDR regime regarded the former government precinct as a relic of Prussian and Nazi militarism and imperialism, and had all the ruins of the government buildings demolished in the early 1950s. In the late 1950s there were almost no buildings at all along the Wilhelmstrasse from Unter den Linden to the Leipziger Strasse. The only major surviving public building in the Wilhelmstrasse was just Göring's Reich Air Ministry, which had escaped major damage during the war. As one of the few intact government buildings in central Berlin, it was used by the Soviet Military Administration in Germany and the (East) German Economic Commission, later by the German People's Council of the Soviet occupation zone, its People's Chamber successor and several East German ministries and government departments. As Haus der Ministerien it was at the centre of the popular demonstrations during the workers' uprising of 17 June 1953.

The building of the Berlin Wall in 1961 cut the street in half. In 1964 the East Berlin section of the street was named after the former GDR Minister-president Otto Grotewohl, who had died in office on 21 September. Several embassies of "befriended" countries were erected on the corner with Unter den Linden from about 1970 onwards. The new embassy building of the Czechoslovak Socialist Republic was erected from 1974 to 1978 on Wilhelmplatz. In the 1980s, several Plattenbau (concrete slab) apartment blocks were built on the cleared premises along East Berlin Otto-Grotewohl-Straße. The flats were quite popular among the nomenklatura, as they provided an undisturbed view across the Wall's towards West Berlin. The former "death strip" is today the site of the Memorial to the Murdered Jews of Europe.

== Today ==
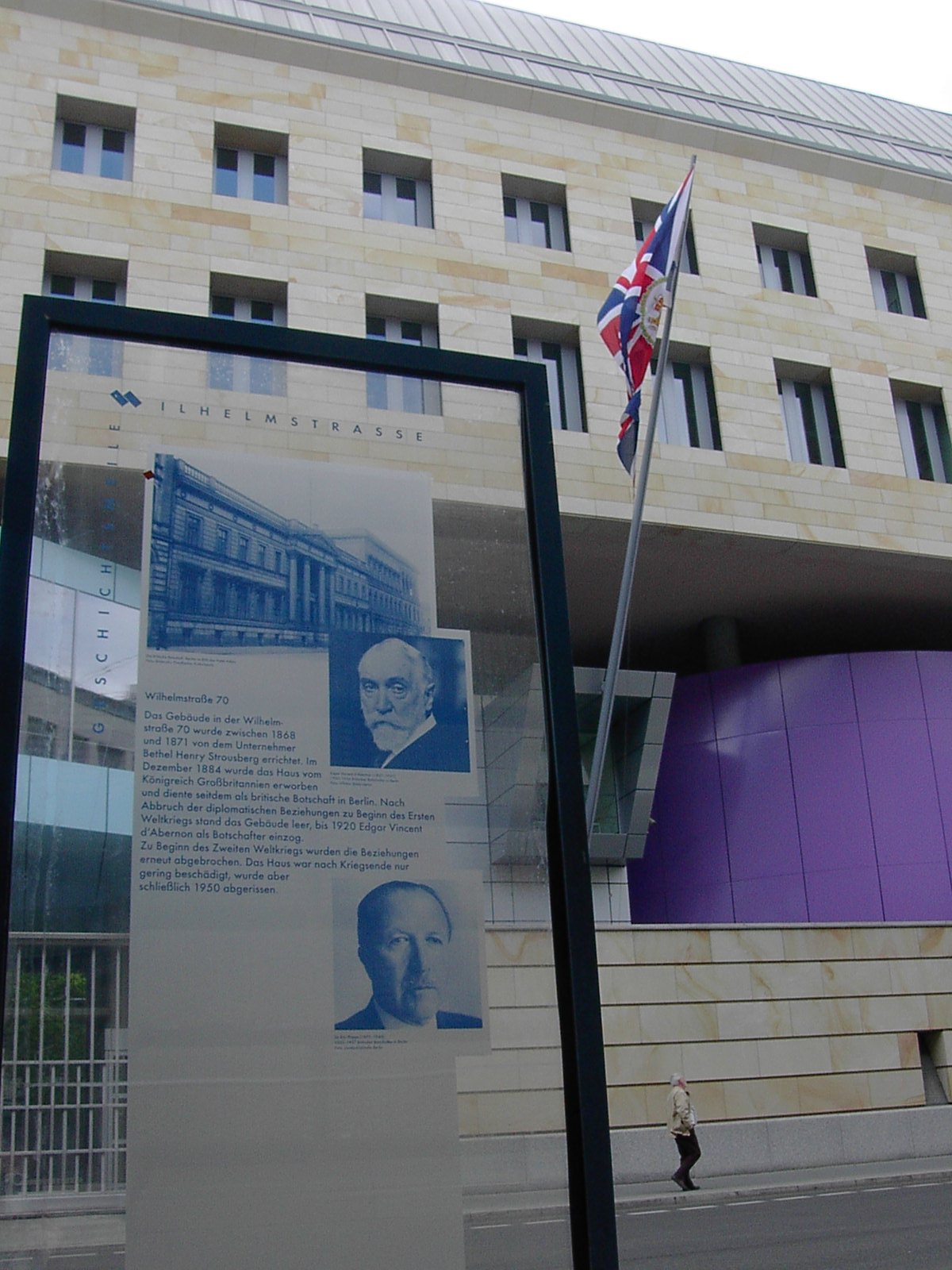
New British Embassy, historical marker displays Ambassadors Lord D'Abernon and Sir Eric Phipps

Today, the Wilhelmstraße is an important traffic artery, but has not regained its former status. Since German reunification, some federal ministries have moved their seats to Wilhelmstraße, such as the Ministry of Labour and Social Affairs on former Wilhelmplatz, the Ministry of Finance in the former Reich Ministry of Aviation complex (renamed Detlev-Rohwedder-Haus in 1992), as well as the Federal Ministry of Food, Agriculture and Consumer Protection on Wilhelmstraße 72 – the only German government ministry now located on its prewar site although in a partly reconstructed building.

The British Embassy, whose original building had been destroyed by bombing, was rebuilt on the site. Queen Elizabeth II officiated at the grand opening in July 2000. Other public institutions on Wilhelmstraße include the ARD-Hauptstadtstudio (television studio) of the ARD broadcasting organization at the northern Spree riverside, the E-Werk techno club, the Topography of Terror museum at the former Reichssicherheitshauptamt site, and the Willy-Brandt-Haus headquarters of the Social Democratic Party of Germany on the southern corner with Stresemannstrasse.

Many of the occupants of the GDR apartment blocks are recent immigrants, and there are a number of shops and restaurants catering to Russians and Turks. In recent years the City of Berlin has placed a series of historical markers along Wilhelmstraße, showing where the well-known buildings of the pre-war era stood. On 8 November 2011 a memorial in honour of the failed assassin Johann Georg Elser was inaugurated at the site of the former Reich Chancellery.

== People, who lived at Wilhelmstrasse ==
- Otto von Bismarck (Old Reichs chancelery) (politician)
- Paul von Hindenburg (Reich president building) (politician)
- Adolf Hitler (Old Reich chancelery) (politician)
- Adolph Menzel (painter)
- Albrecht Haushofer (geograph)
- Otto Brahm (theatre director)
- Gerson von Bleichröder (banker)
- Bethel Henry Strousberg (industrialist and railway entrepreneur)
- Kurt Hager (during 1980s) (politician)
- Günter Schabowski(during 1980s) (politician)
- Heinrich Scheel (during 1980s) (historian)
- Angela Merkel (during 1990s) (politician)
- Birgit Breuel (during 1990s) (politician)
