= Voßstraße =

Street in Berlin, Germany

- Voss Strasse or Vossstrasse
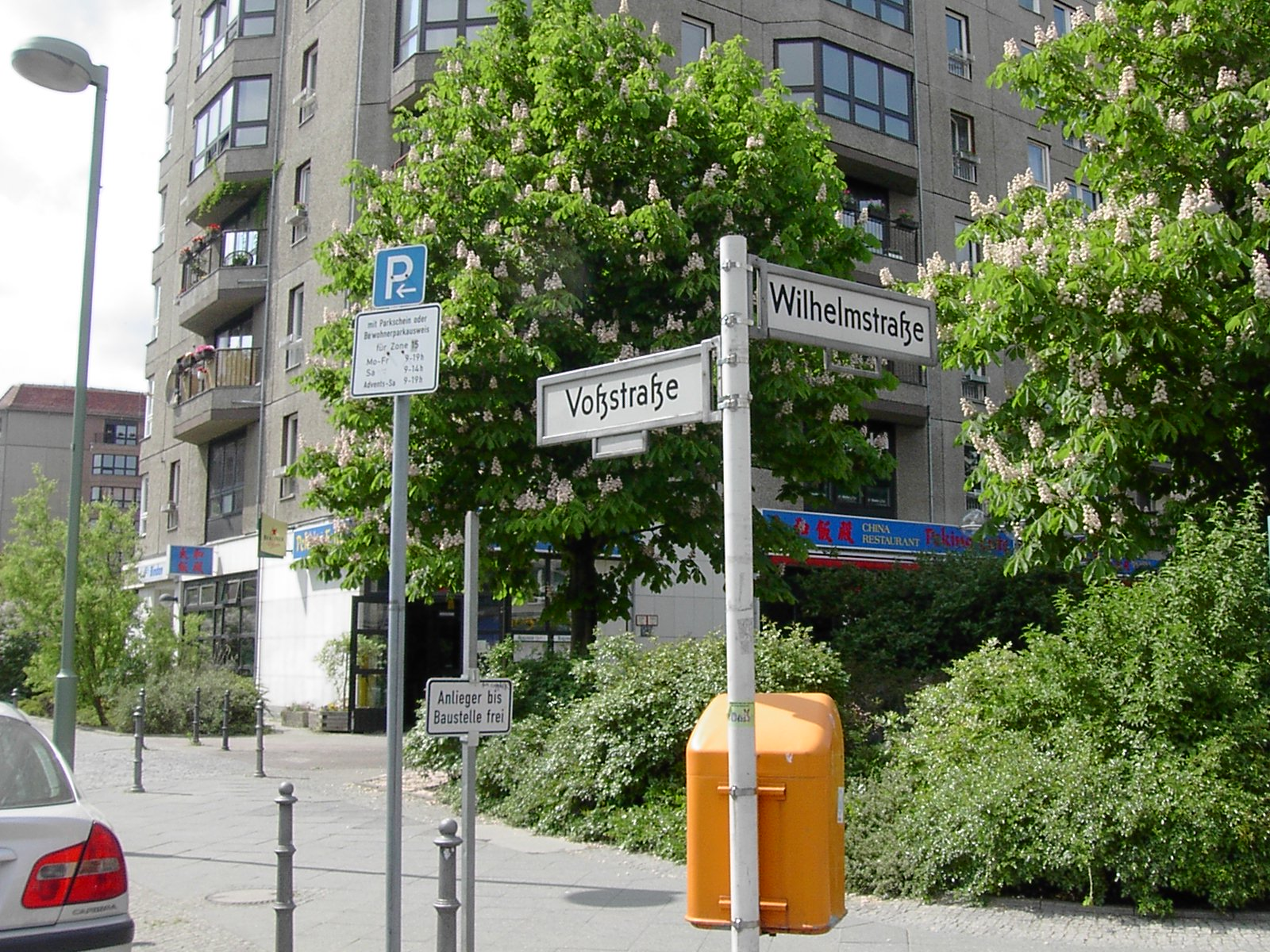
- Site of the former Reich Chancellery at the corner of Voßstraße and Wilhelmstrasse
- Interactive map of Voßstraße
- Former names: An der Kolonnade Nr. 15; (1872–1874)
- Namesake: Ferdinand von Voß-Buch
- Type: Street
- Location: Berlin, Germany
- Quarter: Mitte, Tiergarten
- Nearest metro station: Mohrenstraße; Potsdamer Platz
- Coordinates: 52°30′39″N 13°22′48″E
- East end: Mohrenstraße; Wilhelmstrasse
- Major junctions: Gertrud-Kolmar-Straße
- West end: Ebertstraße; Hans-von-Bülow-Straße

Construction
- Inauguration: Generally: 1872; Current name: 2 May 1874

Voßstraße (also sometimes: Voss Strasse or Vossstrasse (see also ß); German pronunciation: [ˈfɔsˌʃtʁaːsə]) is a street in central Berlin, the capital of Germany. It runs east–west from Ebertstraße to Wilhelmstraße in the borough of Mitte, one street north of Leipziger Straße and very close to Potsdamer Platz. It is best known for being the location of Hitler's new Reich Chancellery complex, and the bunker where he spent his last days.

== History ==
In the 18th and 19th centuries, the area was the site of several mansions owned by members of the Prussian aristocracy, some of which were taken over by government departments. One of these was the home of Ferdinand August Hans Friedrich von Voß-Buch (1788–1871), a Prussian military officer who was at one time commander of the "Garde-Grenadier-Regiment Kaiser Alexander von Russland" which was stationed in Berlin, and who retired with the rank of General in 1854 and became a Count in 1864. His home was the "Marschall Palais" in Wilhelmstraße (sometimes referred to as "Palais Voß" or the "Voßsche Palais"), built in 1736 by architect Philipp Gerlach (1679-1748) and demolished in 1872, the year after Voß-Buch's death, to allow the creation of the street which was to bear his name. (Another street under the same name in Berlin's district Tempelhof-Schöneberg was named after Johann Heinrich Voss).

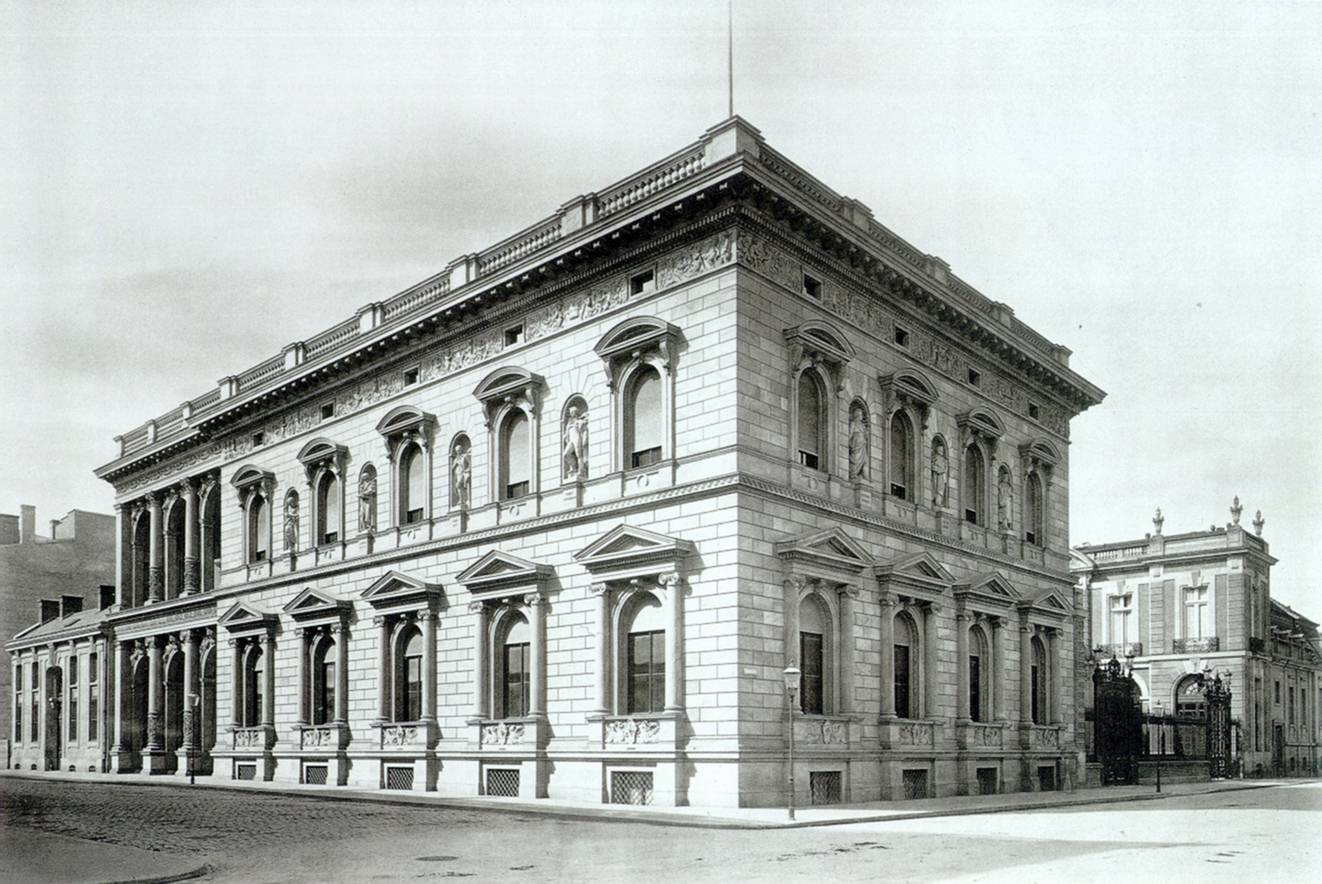
Palais Borsig, about 1881

Among the notable buildings in the Voßstrasse in the mid-1930s were:

On the north side, numbered from east to west:

- Voßstraße 1 - the Borsig Palais, on the corner of Wilhelmstraße, built in 1875–1877 on part of the site of the former Marshall Palais, for the German businessman and manufacturer Albert Borsig (1829–1878), son of locomotive engineer August Borsig, although he never actually moved into it and died a year after its completion
- 2 - the head office of Mitropa, a catering company which from 1916 until 2002 managed sleeping and dining cars throughout the German rail system
- 3 - the Embassy of Bavaria
- 4-5 - the Justice Ministry of the German Empire, Weimar Republic and Third Reich
- 6 - the head office of the German Reich Railway Co
- 10 - the Embassy of Württemberg
- 11 - the Nazi Party's Berlin offices
- 15 - the Bank of Delbrück Schickler & Co
- 19 - the Embassy of Saxony.

On the south side, numbered from west to east:

- Voßstraße 20 - the former Reich Naval Office, which had relocated to the Bendlerblock in 1914
- 22 - the Mosse Palais, home of the German Jewish publishing tycoon Hans Lachmann-Mosse (1885–1944)
- 24-32 - the rear of the enormous Jewish-owned department store Wertheim
- 33-35 - more offices of the German Reich Railway Co. By the 1930s the latter had been taken over by the new Reich Ministry of Transport, which in its final form occupied an extensive range of buildings with facades in three streets (Voßstrasse, Leipziger Straße and Wilhelmstraße). Other addresses in Voßstrasse were mostly residential properties.

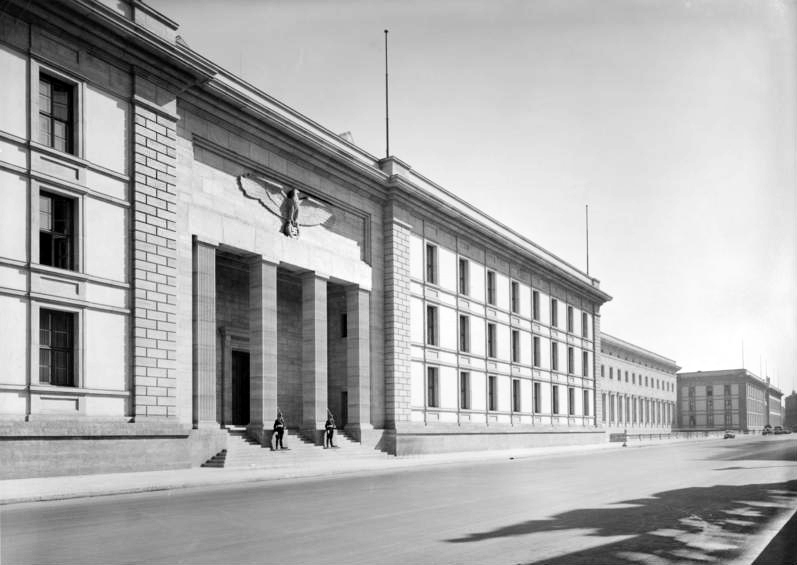
New Reich Chancellery, 1939

In 1938 the entire north side of the street, except for the Borsig Palais (Voßstraße 1), was demolished to make way for the new Reich Chancellery building, built by Albert Speer for Adolf Hitler and opened in January 1939. Incorporating the Borsig Palais within its structure, the Chancellery extended back along the whole length of the Voßstrasse, a distance of 430 metres: its official address was Voßstraße 6. The building was severely damaged by Allied bombs in February 1945, and the ruins later demolished by the Soviet occupying forces. Hitler killed himself in the Führerbunker, a little further north, on 30 April 1945.

From 7 October 1949, Voßstrasse was located in East Berlin, which did little to develop the Potsdamer Platz area as it was in the sensitive border zone, along which the Berlin Wall would eventually divide the city. By 1956 there was only one surviving building in the entire length of Voßstrasse - part of the German Reich Railway Co. offices (Voßstrasse 33). When the Berlin Wall went up in August 1961, much of Voßstraße became stranded in no-man's-land. Today, there is still little of note along the street, although it continues to attract curious visitors looking for the site of the Reich Chancellery and the Führerbunker.

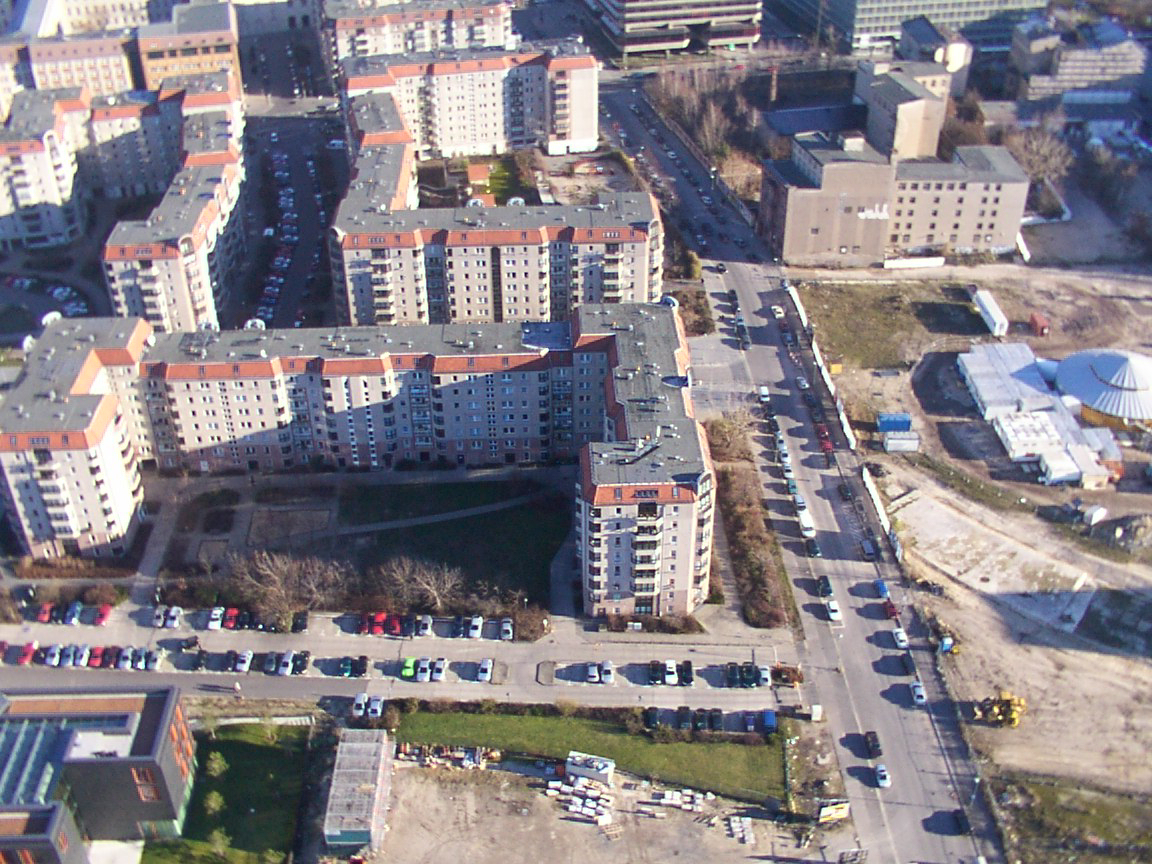
Voßstrasse from the air in December 2003

In the aerial photograph on the right, taken in December 2003, Voßstrasse runs from top to bottom just to the right of centre. The Reich Chancellery ran the full length of the north (left) side, up to Wilhelmstraße, the street running from left to right at the top of the picture. Today there are several GDR-era apartment blocks, built between 1986 and 1990, and some fenced-off waste land behind the apartment blocks along Wilhelmstraße. On the south (right) side of Voßstrasse, the sole-surviving pre-war building, part of the German Reich Railway Co. offices (Voßstraße 33), can be seen, mostly surrounded by the empty sites of the Wertheim department store and the rest of the Transport Ministry. Note also the concrete "lid" over the U-Bahn line.

== Legacy ==
Some of the stones from the new Reich Chancellery on Voßstrasse were later used for the Soviet War Memorial in Berlin-Treptow.
