= Albert Borsig =

German entrepreneur (1829-1878)

August Julius Albert Borsig
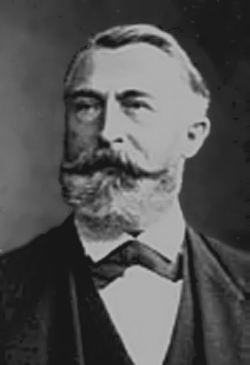
- Born: March 7, 1829; Berlin, Germany
- Died: April 10, 1878 (aged 49); Berlin, Germany
- Occupation: Entrepreneur
- Children: 3
- Father: August Borsig

August Julius Albert Borsig (born 7 March 1829 in Berlin; died 10 April 1878 in Berlin) was a German entrepreneur. He was the son of August Borsig and founder of the Borsig company.

== Career ==
Albert Borsig attended the Friedrichwerdersches Gymnasium for the last three years of his school education. He spent a large part of his free time in the workshops of his father's company and had already learned molding when he graduated from high school in 1848. After extensive practical training in the factory, he attended the Royal Commercial Institute in Berlin, and then the military service. At the age of 25 he joined the family business in 1854, and took over management after August Borsig's death. His three sons (Ernst Borsig, Arnold Borsig, and Conrad von Borsig) in turn directed the mechanical engineering institute and iron foundry in Berlin-Moabit until the Berlin production facilities were merged into one large plant near Berlin-Tegel. In 1875-1877 he built Borsig Palace at Voßstraße in Berlin.

== Marriage and family ==
Borsig married Anna Guticke, daughter of factory owner Guticke of Stettin, at Wełna in 1861.

== Honours ==
In 1869, Borsig was honored with the title of Geheimer Kommerzienrat (Privy Commercial Councillor) in recognition of his contributions to the public good, following in the footsteps of his father, who had received the same honorary title.
