= Borsig Palace =

Former building in Berlin, Germany

Coordinates: 52°30′42″N 13°22′59″E

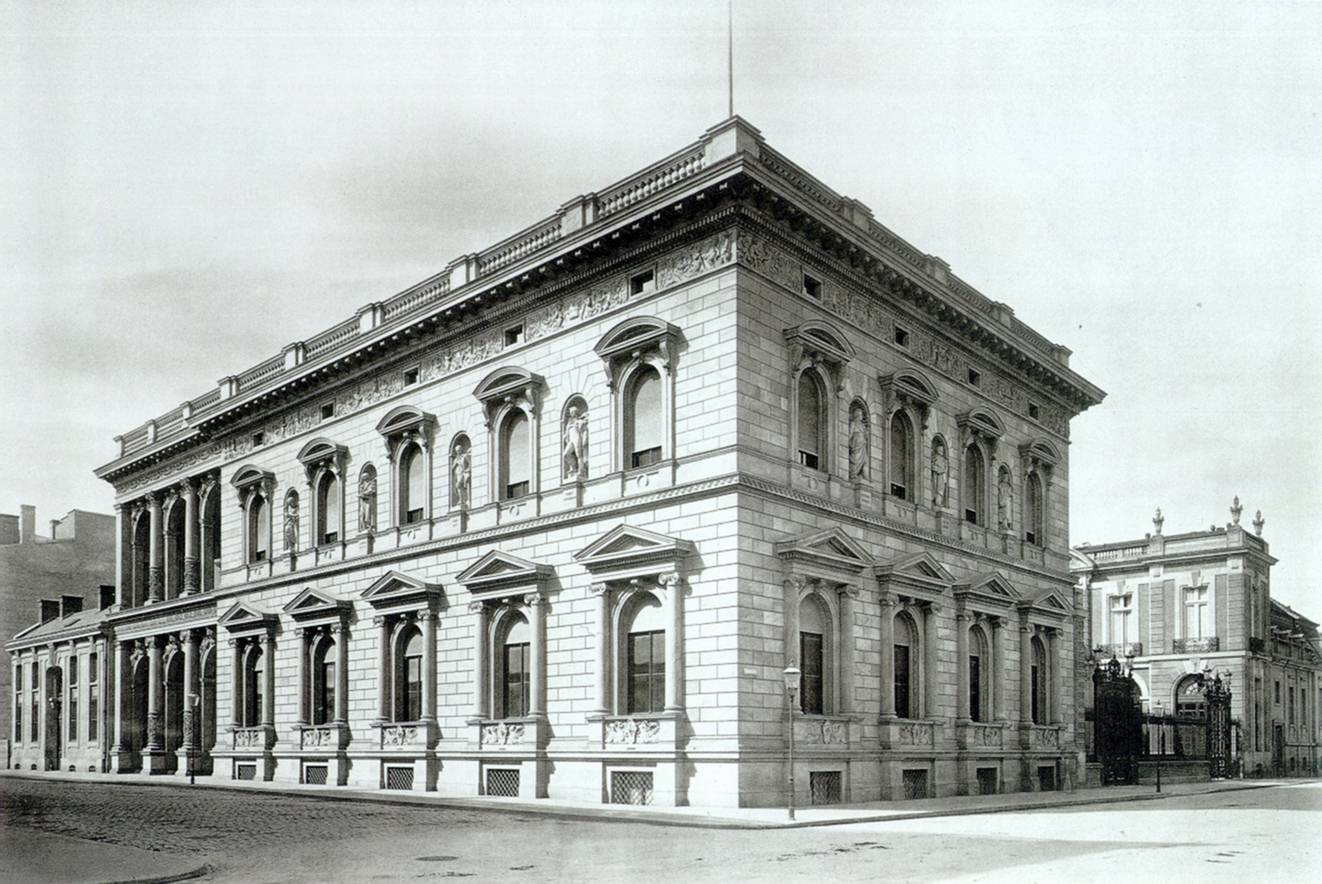
Palais Borsig in 1881

The Borsig Palace (German: Palais Borsig) was an iconic building at the corner of Voßstraße and Wilhelmstraße in the center of Berlin and one of the grandest Italianate villas in Germany. Completed in 1877 for industrialist Albert Borsig, who died before he could move in, the building served for a time as a bank. In 1933 it became the residence of Vice-Chancellor Franz von Papen, where dramatic scenes relating to the Night of the Long Knives would play out just one year later. In the aftermath, Palais Borsig was converted into the new headquarters of the Sturmabteilung (Storm Troopers) on Adolf Hitler's direct orders. It was then integrated into the New Reich Chancellery by Albert Speer in 1938. The palace was severely damaged in World War II and, together with Hitler's Chancellery, demolished by the Soviet forces in 1947.

== Construction ==
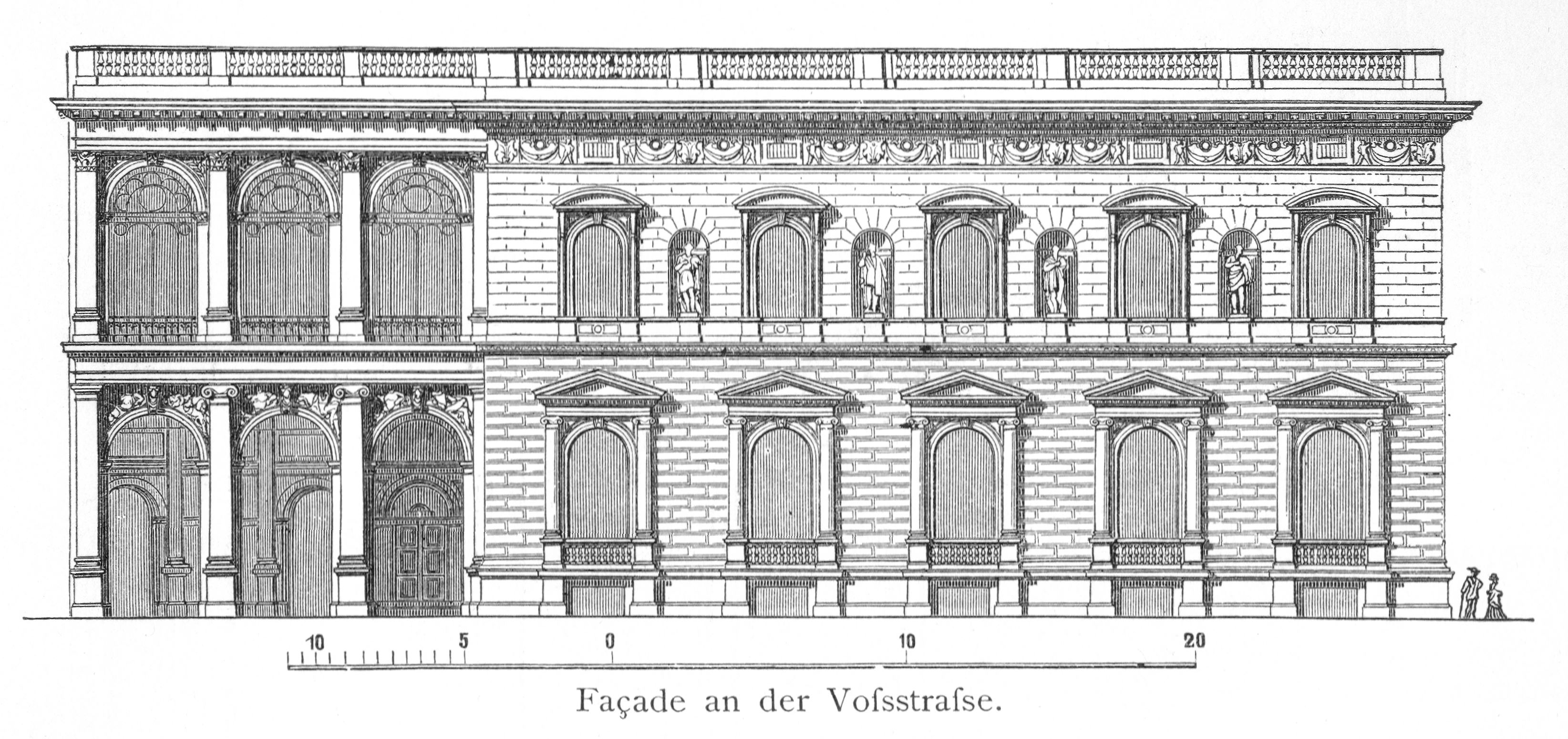
Voßstraße facade of the Borsig Palace

Albert Borsig (1829–1878), industrialist and son of Borsig Lokomotiv-Werke founder August Borsig, hired Berlin's best architects and artists for his new home. It was designed in a neo-Renaissance Italianate style by Richard Lucae, director of the Berlin Academy of Architecture. Eminent sculptors Reinhold Begas, Otto Lessing, Erdmann Encke and Emil Hundrieser all contributed to the project. Statues of Archimedes, Leonardo da Vinci, James Watt, George Stephenson and Karl Friedrich Schinkel were positioned in niches on the upper floor to symbolize technological progress. With walls covered in slabs of sandstone, construction took place between 1875 and 1877.

== History ==
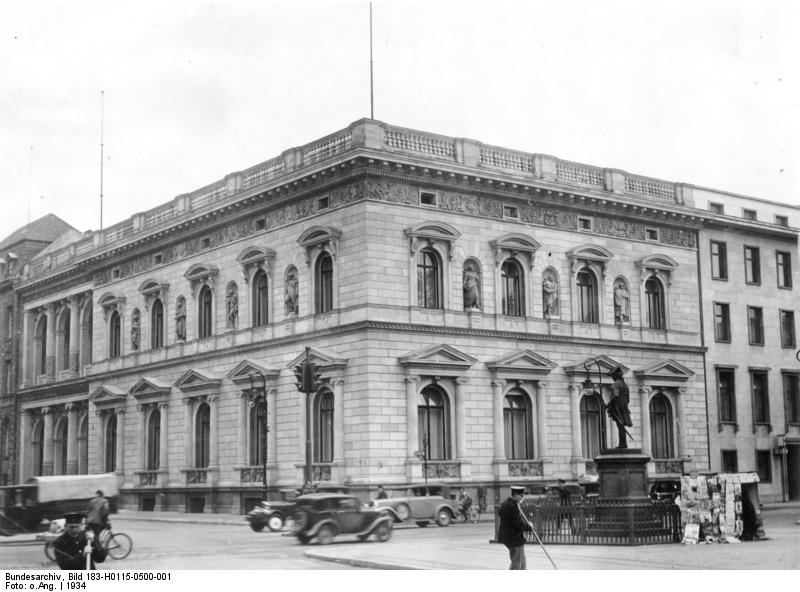
The Borsig Palace in 1934

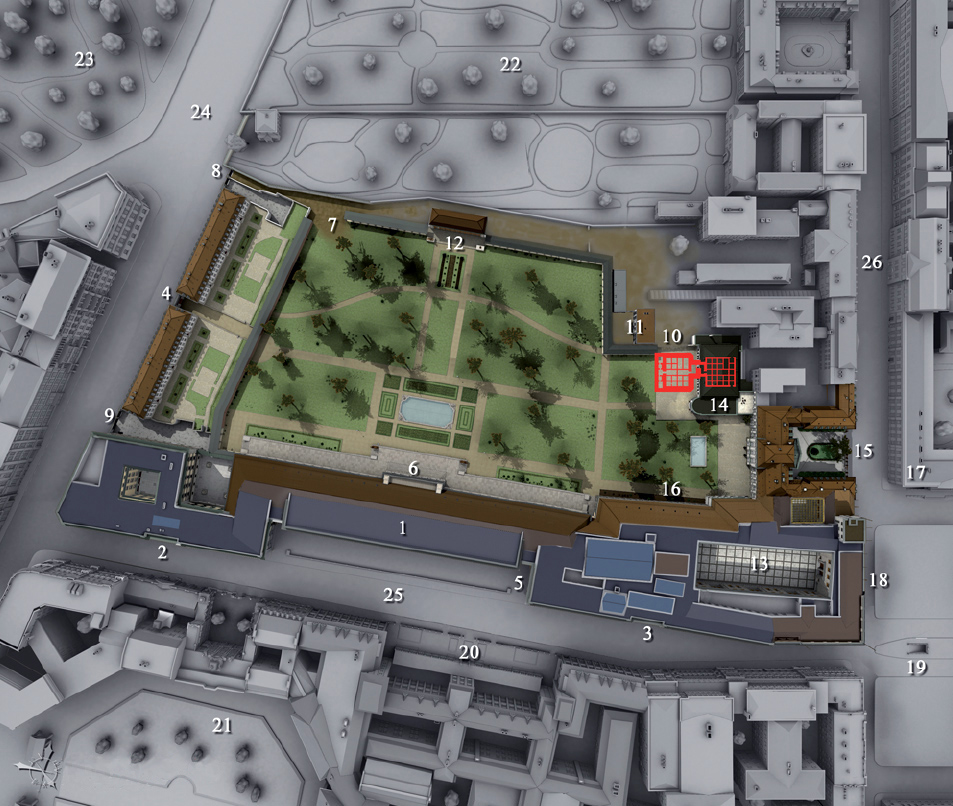
New Reich Chancellery complex in 1940. The Borsig palace is in the lower right corner, with the light brown roof

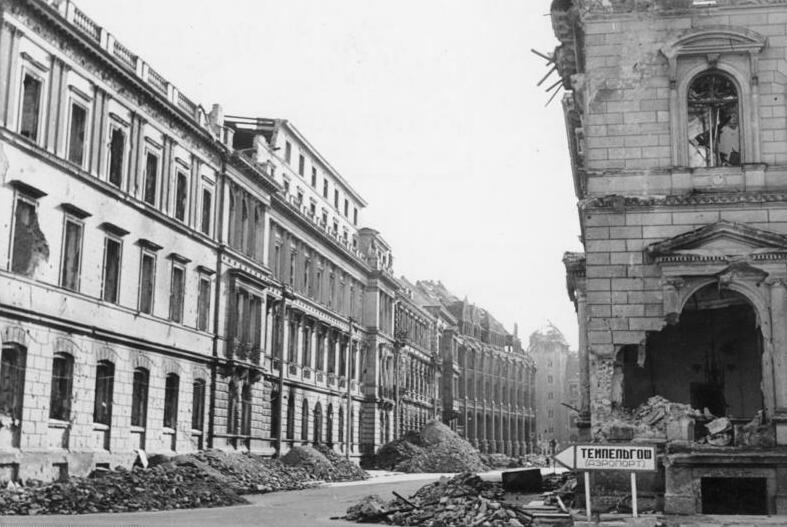
View down the Voßstraße in 1946, with the ruins of the Borsig Palace on the right

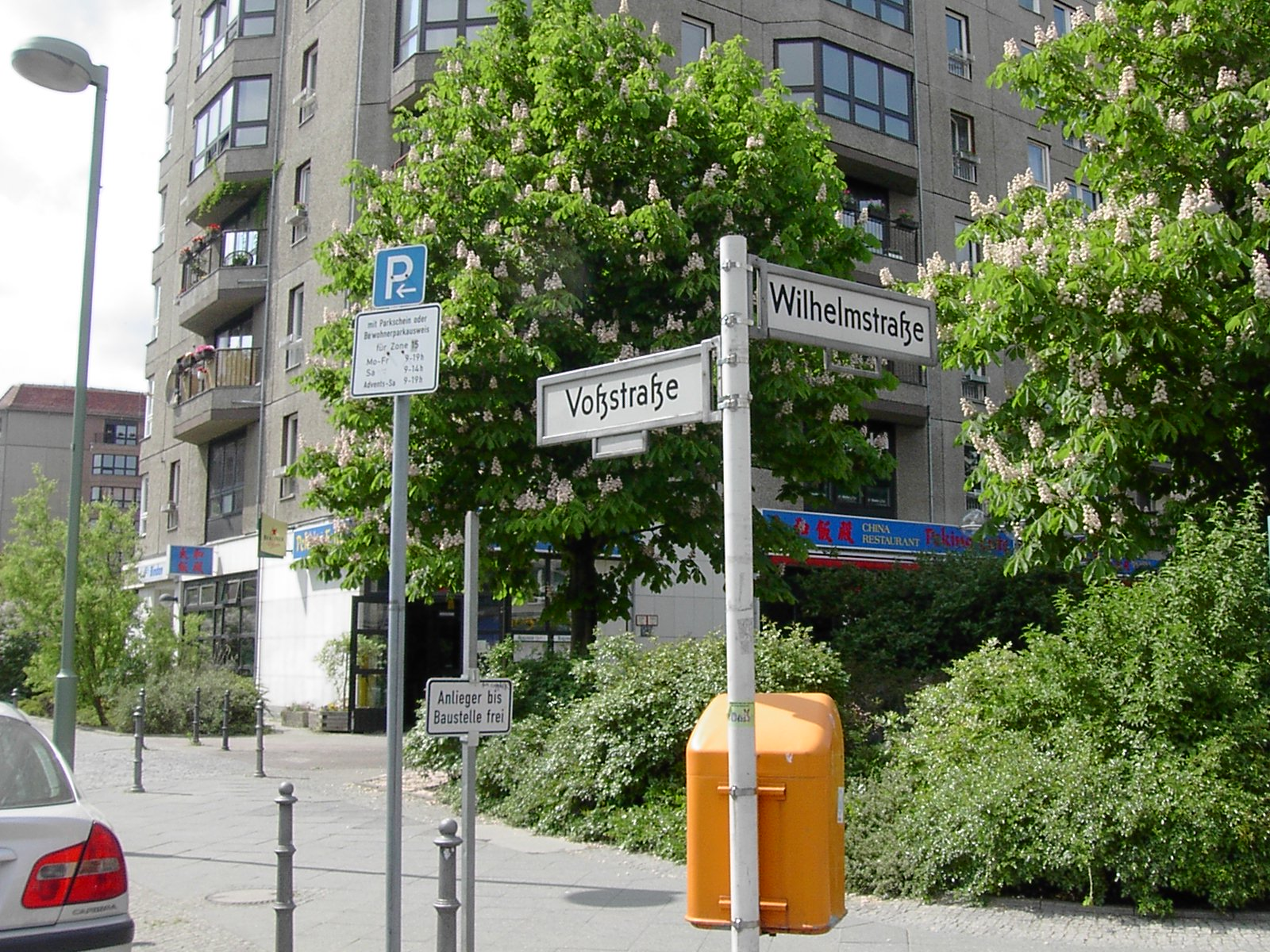
Site of the Borsig Palace today

The Borsig family never used the building as a residence, as Albert Borsig died shortly after its completion. By 1904 it was the headquarters of the Prussian Mortgage Bank (German: Preußische Pfandbriefbank).

In June 1933, Palais Borsig became the official residence and offices of the Vice-Chancellor of Germany, Franz von Papen. On March 23, 1934 the Nazi government purchased the Vice-Chancellery (German: Reichsvizekanzlei). During this period the building was also referred to as the "Reich complaint unit," since von Papen and his closest associates formed a conservative resistance group to Nazi dictatorship. This "Papen Circle" included seven members from his staff: Herbert von Bose, Wilhelm Freiherr von Ketteler, Friedrich Carl von Savigny Jr., Fritz Günther Tschirschky, Hans von Kageneck, Kurt Josten and Walter Hummel. The lawyer Edgar Julius Jung and members of his firm were also involved.

During the "Night of the Long Knives," a purge of Sturmabteilung (SA) leadership, Hitler took the occasion to have various other political opponents arrested or executed. This included members of the "Papen Circle," and on the morning of June 30, 1934, the Borsig Palace was stormed by an SS-squad and a few Gestapo agents. Bose, the Vice-Chancellery press secretary, was forced into a conference room – allegedly to be interrogated – and shot from behind ten times as he took a seat. Papen was placed under house arrest at his private apartment in the Lennéstraße. Tschirschky, Savigny and Hummelsheim were all arrested and held temporarily at Gestapo headquarters. Kageneck, Ketteler and Josten were able to leave unhindered and escaped. Jung – who had already been arrested on June 25 – was shot later that day.

The very next day, Hitler ordered Albert Speer to rebuild the Borsig Palace into offices for the new SA leadership. When Papen's remaining staff complained, Hitler flew into a rage and ordered them out within 24 hours. Speer began remodeling immediately and told the workmen to create as much dust and noise as possible. In his memoirs, he wrote: "Twenty-four hours later they moved out. In one of the rooms I saw a large pool of dried blood on the floor. There, on June 30, Herbert von Bose, one of Papen's assistants, had been shot. I looked away and from then on avoided the room. But the incident did not affect me any more deeply than that." During the summer and fall of 1934 the SA moved in: 32 rooms became the Supreme SA Leadership Office (German: Oberste SA-Führung (OSAF)) under Viktor Lutze and 12 rooms were dedicated for Otto Meissner's offices as "Chief of the Presidential Chancellery of the Führer".

In 1937 Speer was commissioned to build the enormous New Reich Chancellery, which was to take up the entire block, including the corner of Voßstraße and Wilhelmstraße where the Borsig Palace stood. The building was retained and integrated into the project. The entire complex was severely damaged in World War II, first by Allied bombing and then subsequent fires in the Battle of Berlin. It was finally demolished by the Soviet occupation forces in 1947 and parts used for reconstruction projects in Berlin. Today, the former grounds of the Palais Borsig and the nearby Führerbunker, are occupied by nine-storey apartment blocks, a Chinese restaurant, and a parking lot (pictured).

== Borsig Villas ==
Two other buildings in Berlin have had the name "Villa Borsig," not to be confused with the "Palais Borsig". They are:

- Borsig-Villa Reiherwerder in Berlin-Reinickendorf on Tegeler See
- Villa Borsig in Berlin-Moabit at Straße Alt-Moabit, 1849-1911
