= Church of the Resurrection, Katowice =

Church in Katowice, Poland

Coordinates: 50°15′32″N 19°01′37″E

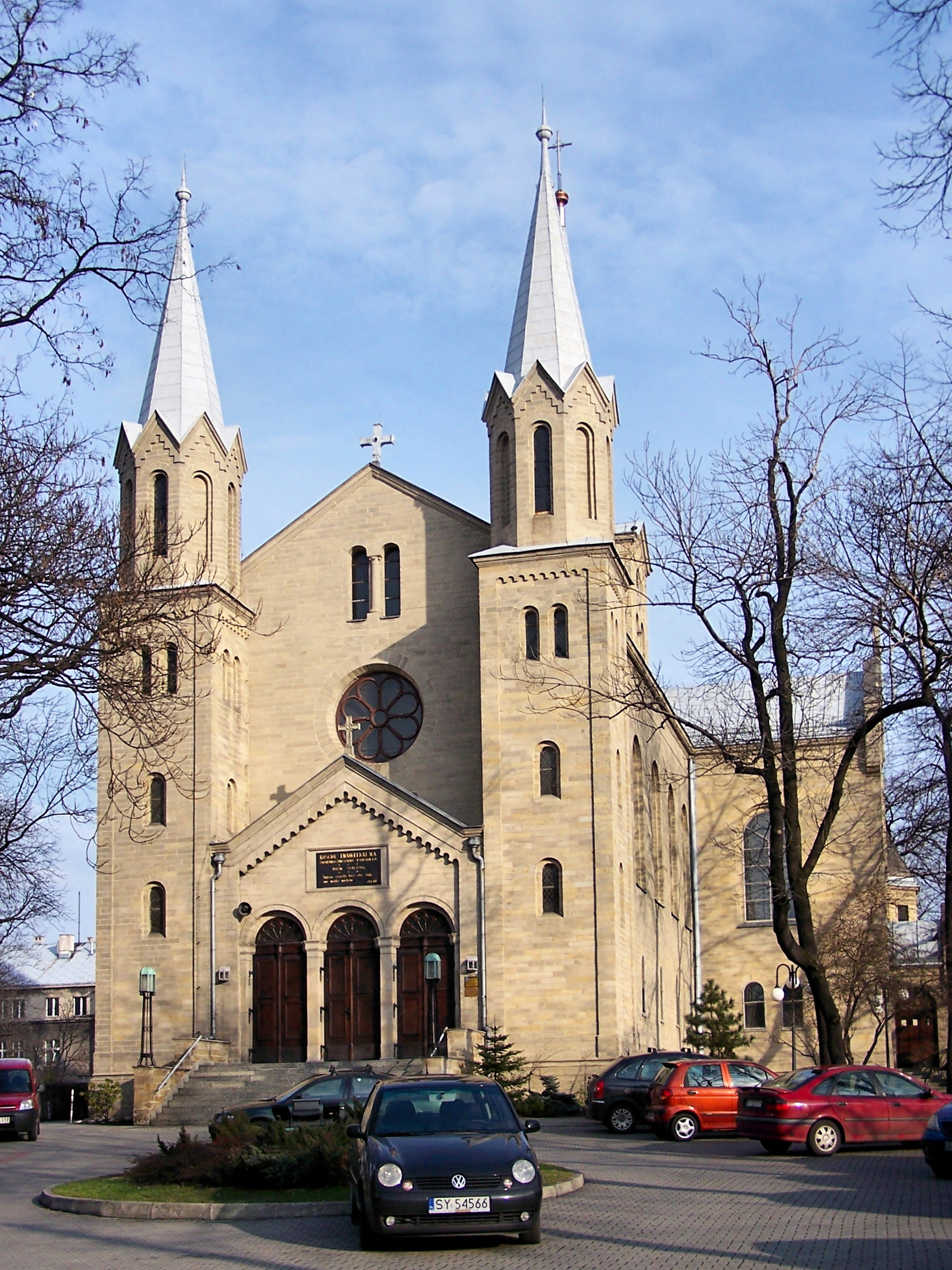
Church of the Resurrection in Katowice

Church of the Resurrection in Katowice is a neo-Roman Evangelical-Augsburg church in the Śródmieście district, Katowice, Poland. It was built in the years 1856–1858 and was the first masonry church in Katowice.
