= Ernst Borsig =

German industrialist (1869-1933)

- Born: 13 September 1869; Berlin-Moabit
- Died: 6 January 1933 (aged 63); Brandenburg
- Education: Technische Hochschule Charlottenburg; University of Bonn
- Occupation: German industrialist

Ernst August Paul Borsig (13 September 1869 in Berlin-Moabit – 6 January 1933 in Gut Groß Behnitz, Brandenburg) was a German industrialist.

== Biography ==
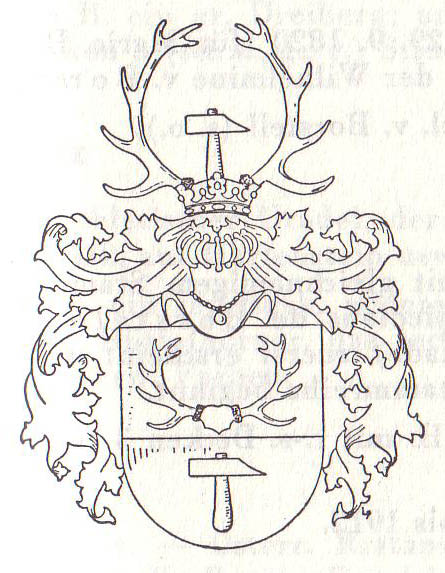
The coat of arms of the von Borsig family (1909)

=== Life and career ===
Borsig graduated from high school in Berlin in 1889, and then completed technical training at the Mechanical Engineering Industry Association He then studied at the University of Bonn and the Technische Hochschule Charlottenburg. In 1890 he became a member of the Corps Hansea Bonn.

Ernst Borsig played a major role in the relocation of the Moabit workshops to Berlin-Tegel. He visited a number of well-known local and foreign factories, and sent some of his technical officials on extensive study trips to England and America. This resulted in the drafts for the new plant, which after its completion in 1898, became a landmark in Berlin.

In 1898, Borsig married Margarete Gründler. They had four children together: Karl Albert Arnold (1899), Margret (1900), Annelise (1902) and Ernst von Borsig junior (1906).

In 1910 Ernst von Borsig was one of the 60 richest men in the Kingdom of Prussia with a fortune of 22 million marks.

=== Anti-Communism and support for Nazism ===
After the First World War he financially supported the Freikorps. In January 1919 he was instrumental in the creation of the Anti-Bolshevik Fund. He was a member of the Gäa, founded in 1922, an organization consisting of the German bourgeois and nobility which organized right-wing mass propaganda. Also from 1922 he became one of the most important donors of the Nazi Party. He got to know Adolf Hitler during his speech to the Berlin National Club in 1919. He met with him several times and began to advertise the Hitler movement among his industrial friends and to raise money for the NSDAP.

Although still sympathetic to Hitler's cause he later moved away from the Nazi Party in favor of the cabinet of Franz von Papen.

== Literature ==
- Eckhard Hansen, Florian Tennstedt (Eds.) U. a .: Biographical lexicon on the history of German social policy from 1871 to 1945. Volume 2: Social politicians in the Weimar Republic and during National Socialism 1919 to 1945. Kassel University Press, Kassel 2018, ISBN 978-3-7376-0474-1, p. 17 f. (Online, PDF; 3.9 MB).
- Friedrich Schildberger: Borsig, Johann Friedrich August. In: New German Biography (NDB). Volume 2, Duncker & Humblot, Berlin 1955, ISBN 3-428-00183-4, p. 476.
