= Rotes Rathaus station =

Station of the Berlin U-Bahn

Rotes Rathaus
- U-Bahn station Rotes Rathaus

General information
- Location: Mitte; Berlin; Germany
- Coordinates: 52.518889°N 13.408056°E
- System: Ubf
- Operator: Berliner Verkehrsbetriebe
- Line: U5

Construction
- Structure type: Underground
- Architect: Oliver Collignon

History
- Opened: 4 December 2020; 5 years ago

Services
Preceding station	Berlin U-Bahn	Following station
Museumsinsel towards Berlin Hbf	U5	Alexanderplatz towards Hönow
Location
- Location within Berlin

Rotes Rathaus is a subway station in Berlin's Mitte district. It is part of the extension of the U5 from Alexanderplatz to Brandenburger Tor, construction of which began with a groundbreaking ceremony in 2010. The station and the line opened simultaneously on 4 December 2020.

== Planning ==
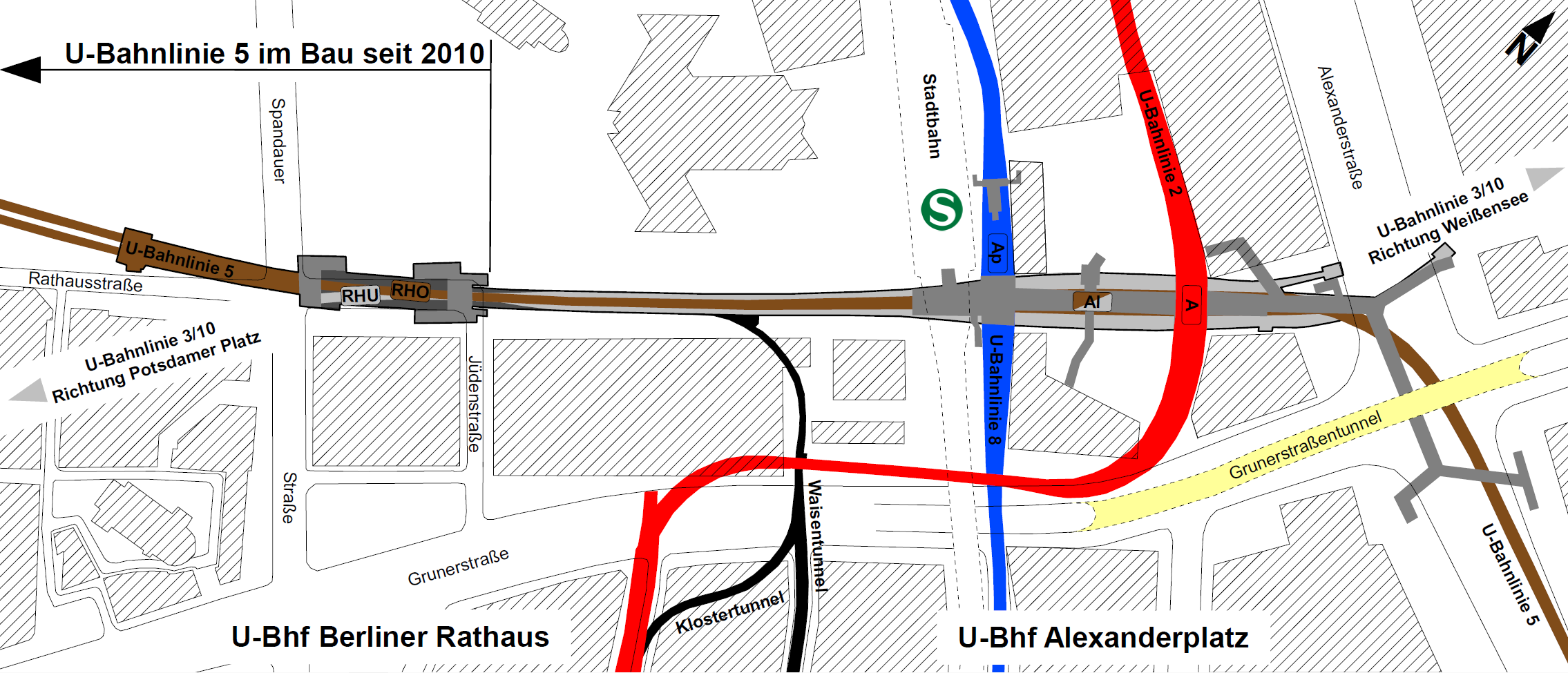
Structure of subway lines U3/U10 and U5 at Alexanderplatz.

The station opened in December 2020. The 100-meter-long station was built under Rathausstraße directly in front of Rotes Rathaus (Berlin city hall). The station has a gross floor area of 8000 m^{2}. The architect is Oliver Collignon.

The station has two levels: On the upper level the U5 line runs with two outside platforms and on the lower level a train storage area with four tracks was built to allow later conversion to a two-track platform if either the long-planned Großprofil lines U3/U35 (not to be confused with the current Kleinprofil U3) and/or U10 to Potsdamer Platz, which have been legally safeguarded as part of Berlin's land-use plan since 1994, are realized.

Pedestrian access is possible from both ends: Spandauer Straße north of Rathausstraße in the west, and two more on Jüdenstraße in the east. Two elevators connect to the platform on the eastern end.

The station was built using cut and cover construction. Following construction of the 32-meter-deep slurry walls, it was topped with an HDI sole lid.

In the west the station joins the excavation pit used for the tunnel boring machine which will contain track switching and a weir chamber under the Spree river. All equipment for the operation, such as power, telecommunication and air conditioning systems is installed in the underground station building.

Until 31 August 2016 the station had the working title Berliner Rathaus (Berlin city hall), however this was officially changed on 1 September 2016 to Rotes Rathaus (red (brick) city hall).

== Construction ==
Archaeological excavations began in 2009 in the area of the starting excavation pit and eventual station which led to the creation of the Berlin Sculpture Fund. At the same time extensive line relocations were needed in the area which lasted until the end of 2011.

The start of station construction was further delayed as archaeologists unexpectedly found well-preserved remains of the medieval Altes Rathaus in front of the Rotes Rathaus during excavations. As a result, the station was rescheduled and an exit relocated so parts of these relics remain preserved and may possibly be presented by an "archaeological window". However, for technical and financial reasons this window will remain initially closed.

While the tunnel sections were constructed in spring of 2012, actual station construction began in early 2013 with a budget of 62 million euros for the station shell.

The topping-out ceremony was celebrated on 7 September 2016 and hosted approximately 3,000 interested visitors.

== See also ==
- Rotes Rathaus the station's namesake and the colloquial name for Berlin city hall.
