= Museumsinsel station =

Station of the Berlin U-Bahn

Museumsinsel
- Train arriving at Museumsinsel station

General information
- Location: Mitte; Berlin; Germany
- Coordinates: 52.517403°N 13.398203°E
- System: Ubf
- Operator: Berliner Verkehrsbetriebe
- Line: U5
- Platforms: 1
- Tracks: 2

Construction
- Structure type: Underground

History
- Opening: 9 July 2021; 5 years ago

Services
Preceding station	Berlin U-Bahn	Following station
Unter den Linden towards Berlin Hbf	U5	Rotes Rathaus towards Hönow
Location
- Location within Berlin Location within Germany Location within Europe

Museumsinsel is a subway station in Berlin's Mitte district. It is part of the extension of the subway line U5 from Alexanderplatz to Brandenburger Tor, with groundbreaking occurring in 2010. The station opened on 9 July 2021.

== Design ==
Platform at Museumsinsel station

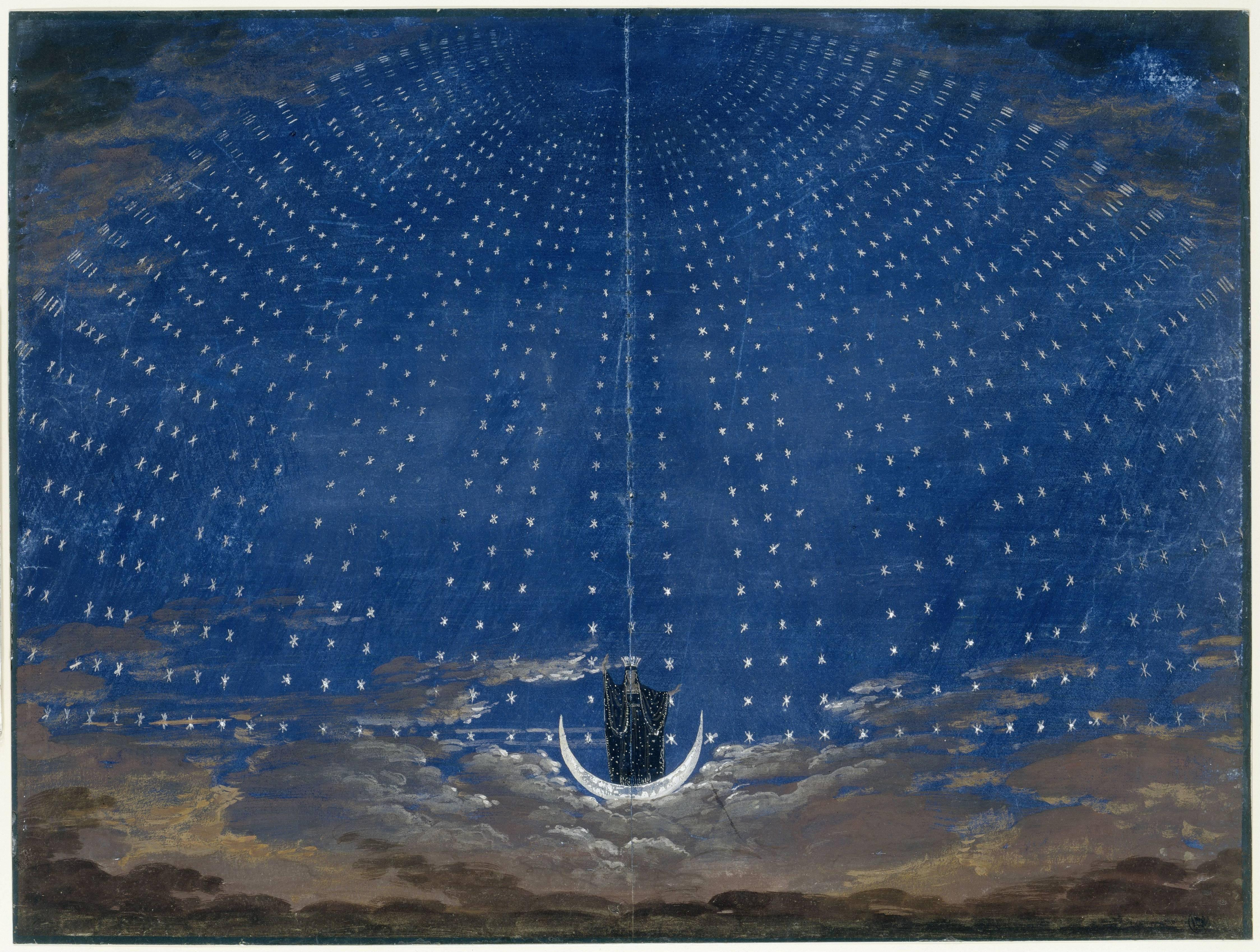
Stage design by Karl Friedrich Schinkel for the opera The Magic Flute (Die Zauberflöte)

The Museumsinsel station has a single central platform at the eastern end of Unter den Linden, between Zeughaus and Berlin Palace. Part of the station is located just south of the Schlossbrücke under the Spree, at a depth of 16 meters below the upper edge of the street.

Entrances lead to the station from both ends, with distribution levels below the road surface. The station can be accessed from the west by an entrance in front of the Kronprinzenpalais and east of the Zeughaus. On the east side of the station, two entrances lie at the northwest corner of the Berliner Schloss. Both ends are equipped with escalators, and near the east entrance is an elevator leading from the surface directly to the platform.

The platform occupies the space between the two tunnels, under a flat ceiling supported by two rows of columns. The design by Max Dudler was inspired by a stage design by Karl Friedrich Schinkel for the opera The Magic Flute (Die Zauberflöte) from 1816 and features a starry sky on a dark blue barrel vault with points of light over the tracks.

== Construction ==
Excavations for the two entrances required different methods. The eastern entrance used open construction while the western entrance was built using a cut-and-cover process. Both were built using slurry walls due to the proximity to the river. Since the eastern excavation pit was located partly in the river, a cofferdam was first created. Unlike other stations on this new U5 extension, the station area was built only after the tunnel boring machine had passed through the site, aided by ground freezing techniques. This icing process was also used during the construction of the Brandenburger Tor station. Glaciation under the Spree was accomplished with a total of 95 holes, each 105 meters long. A cooling liquid consisting of −37 °C cold calcium chloride solution was pumped into these holes, freezing the soil so that the future platform area could be broken up.

At the western end of the station, a weir chamber was built to protect the station from the Spree. All equipment for the operation, such as power supply, telecommunication and air conditioning systems have been installed in the underground station building.

From mid-2010 to the end of 2011, extensive utilities relocations were made in the future station and tunnel areas. In 2011, archaeological excavations were carried out in the area around the eastern entrances. Until 1894, 17th and 18th century houses within the Schlossfreiheit stood here, the foundations and cellars of which were still partially preserved.

At the end of January 2012, the Berliner Verkehrsbetriebe awarded the first contract for the manufacture of the station shell. It included the launch shaft for the tunnel boring machine, tunnels, the Unter den Linden and Museumsinsel stations, and a track change system. The contract value was approximately 190 million euros. The cost of the shell of the Museumsinsel station was estimated at 65 million euros. The actual start of construction began at the end of April 2012.

== See also ==
- Museumsinsel, the name of the northern half of an island in the Spree river which the station is named after
