= Unter den Linden station =

Station of the Berlin U-Bahn

Unter den Linden
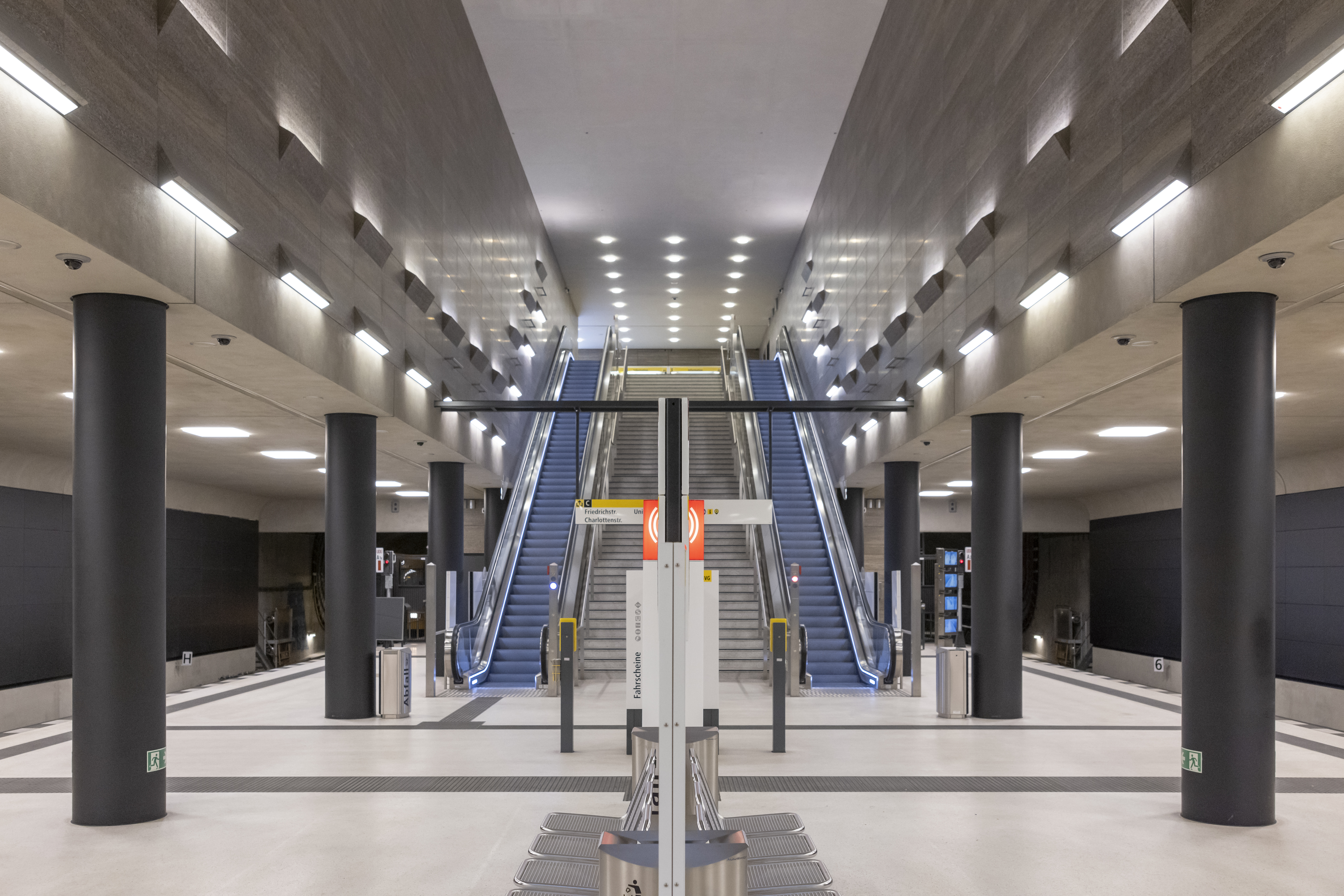
- Station "Unter den Linden"

General information
- Location: Mitte; Berlin; Germany
- Coordinates: 52.5170°N 13.3889°E
- System: Ubf interchange station
- Operator: U-Bahn
- Lines: U5; U6
- Platforms: 2
- Tracks: 2 (U5) + 2 (U6)

Construction
- Structure type: Underground
- Platform levels: 3
- Architect: Ingrid Hentschel; Axel Oestreich

History
- Opened: 4 December 2020; 5 years ago

Services
Preceding station	Berlin U-Bahn	Following station
Brandenburger Tor towards Berlin Hbf	U5	Museumsinsel towards Hönow
Friedrichstraße towards Alt-Tegel	U6	Stadtmitte towards Alt-Mariendorf
Location
- Location within Berlin Location within Germany Location within Europe

Unter den Linden is an U-Bahn station in the central Mitte district of Berlin, at the intersection of Unter den Linden and Friedrichstraße. It is an interchange station between the U5 and U6 U-Bahn lines.

== Overview ==
The U5 line from Hönow in part crosses the historic city centre to the Berlin Hauptbahnhof terminus. Construction of the Unter den Linden station began on 1 July 2012 as part of an extension from Alexanderplatz, necessitating a break in service on the U6 line. The U5 extension opened in 2020, but work on the U6 line had already been completed by October 2013.

The new T-shaped transfer station replaces the nearby U6 station at Französische Straße, which has since been closed. The U5 platform crosses beneath the existing U6 tracks, accessible from the central median of Unter den Linden and the Friedrichstraße sidewalks.

The new station is completely separate from the station which used to be called "Unter den Linden" from 1936 until 2009, and is now called Brandenburger Tor.

== See also ==
- Unter den Linden, the street for which the station is named
