= Unter den Linden =

Thoroughfare in Berlin, Germany

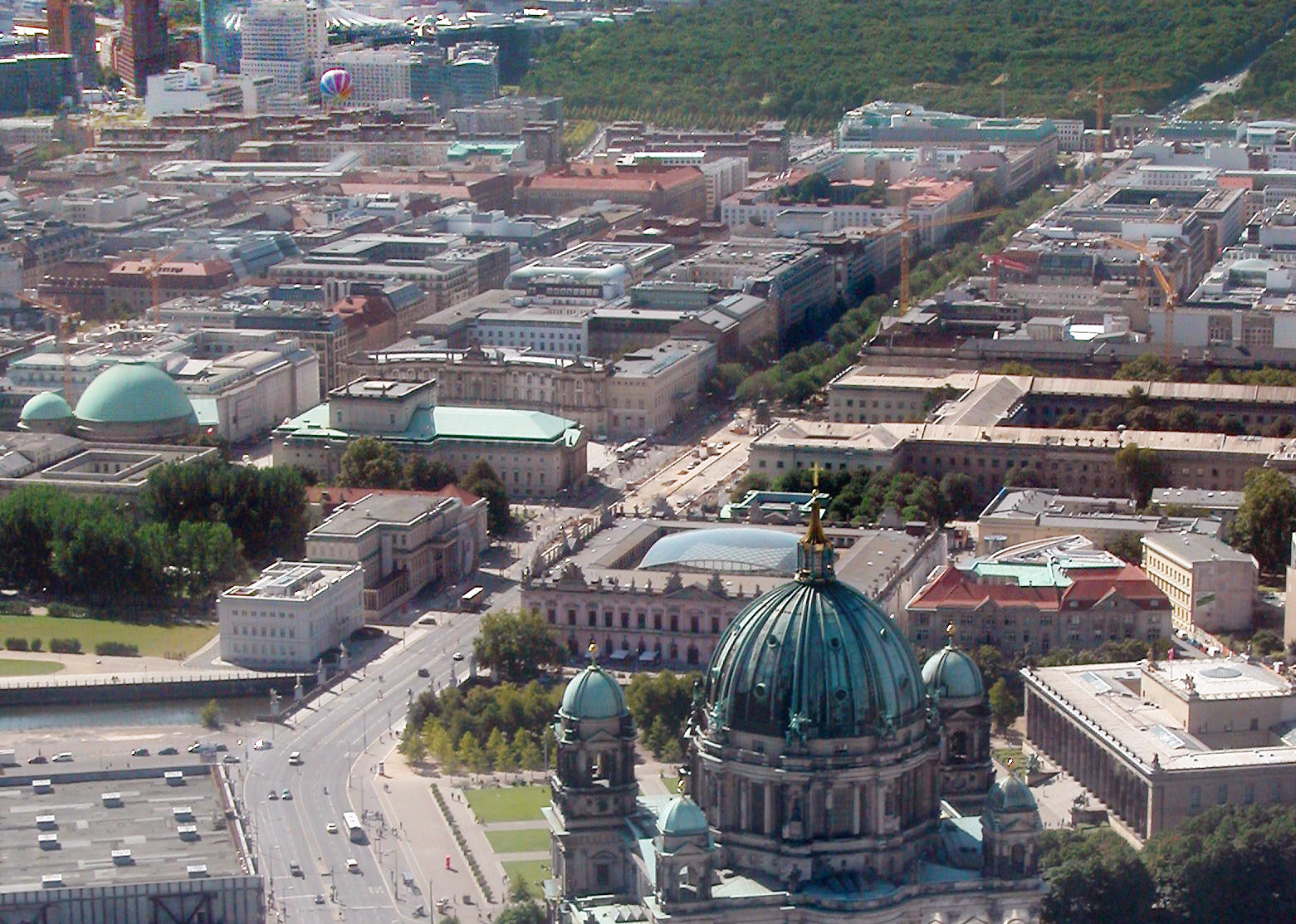
- Unter den Linden from Berlin Cathedral to Brandenburg Gate and Tiergarten park, view from Fernsehturm, 2005
- Interactive map of Unter den Linden
- Former names: Erste Straße; (1673–1674); Neustädtische Allee; (c. 1674–1690); Lindenallee; (1690–1723); Lindenstraße; (1723–1734)
- Part of: Bundesstraße 2; Bundesstraße 5
- Namesake: Linden trees
- Type: Boulevard
- Length: 1,480 m (4,860 ft)
- Width: 60 m (200 ft)
- Location: Berlin, Germany
- Quarter: Mitte
- Nearest metro station: Brandenburger Tor; Unter den Linden; Museumsinsel
- Coordinates: 52°31′00″N 13°22′52″E
- West end: Straße des 17. Juni; Platz des 18. März; Brandenburg Gate; Pariser Platz
- Major junctions: Wilhelmstraße; Schadowstraße; Neustädtische Kirchstraße; Glinkastraße; Friedrichstraße; Charlottenstraße; Universitätsstraße; Bebelplatz; Hinter dem Gießhaus; Oberwallstraße; Niederlagstraße; Am Zeughaus; Schinkelplatz
- East end: Schlossbrücke; Schloßplatz; Berlin Palace; Liebknecht Bridge; Karl-Liebknecht-Straße

Unter den Linden (German: [ˈʊntɐ deːn ˈlɪndn̩], "under the linden trees") is a boulevard in the central Mitte district of Berlin, Germany. Running from the Berlin Palace to the Brandenburg Gate, it is named after the linden trees (also known as lime in the UK and Ireland and basswood in North America, not related to citrus lime) that line the grassed pedestrian mall on the median and the two broad carriageways. The avenue links numerous Berlin sights, landmarks and rivers for sightseeing.

== Overview ==
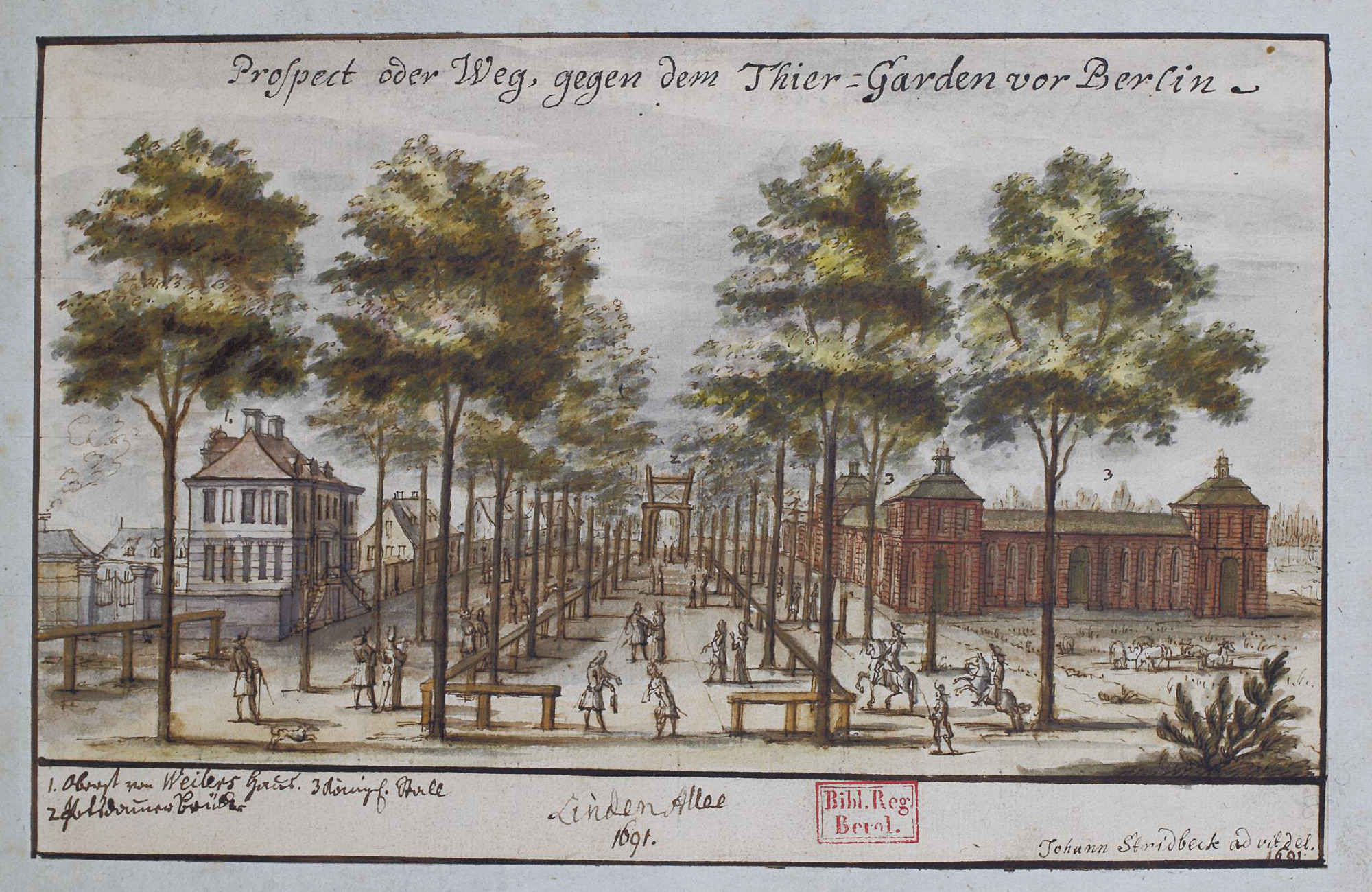
J. Stridbeck, LindenAllee 1691

Unter den Linden runs east–west from the Berlin Palace, the former main residence of the royal House of Hohenzollern, reconstructed (after the demolition of the communist Palace of the Republic) on its old site opposite the Lustgarten park, to Pariser Platz and Brandenburg Gate. Major north–south streets crossing Unter den Linden are Friedrichstraße and Wilhelmstrasse, both meeting at Mehringplatz and running across the Friedrichstadt, a city expansion founded in 1691.

In 1873 the department store Kaisergalerie was opened housing more than 50 shops and cafes. In the early 1930s, the architect Alfred Grenander redesigned the department store in the New Objectivity style. The building was demolished in the 1950s. Eastward the boulevard crosses the Spree river, slightly kinked due to the oblique position of the long side of the palace compared to the boulevard, at the Lustgarten with Berlin Cathedral, and continues as Karl-Liebknecht-Straße, itself continued as Prenzlauer Allee, to the northern outskirts. The western, dead straight continuation behind Brandenburg Gate is the Straße des 17. Juni (formerly Charlottenburger Chaussee), which in turn is extended to the west by the straight sequence of Bismarckstrasse and Kaiserdamm, an axis, widened in 1904, that runs from Berlin Palace more than 10 kilometers across the city to the western outskirts where, slightly elevated, one can survey the length of the axis. The extension of the Linden alley to this gigantic axis was inspired by the Boulevards of Paris. The Kurfürstendamm, the magnificent shopping mile in the historically elegant west of Berlin, was similarly inspired.

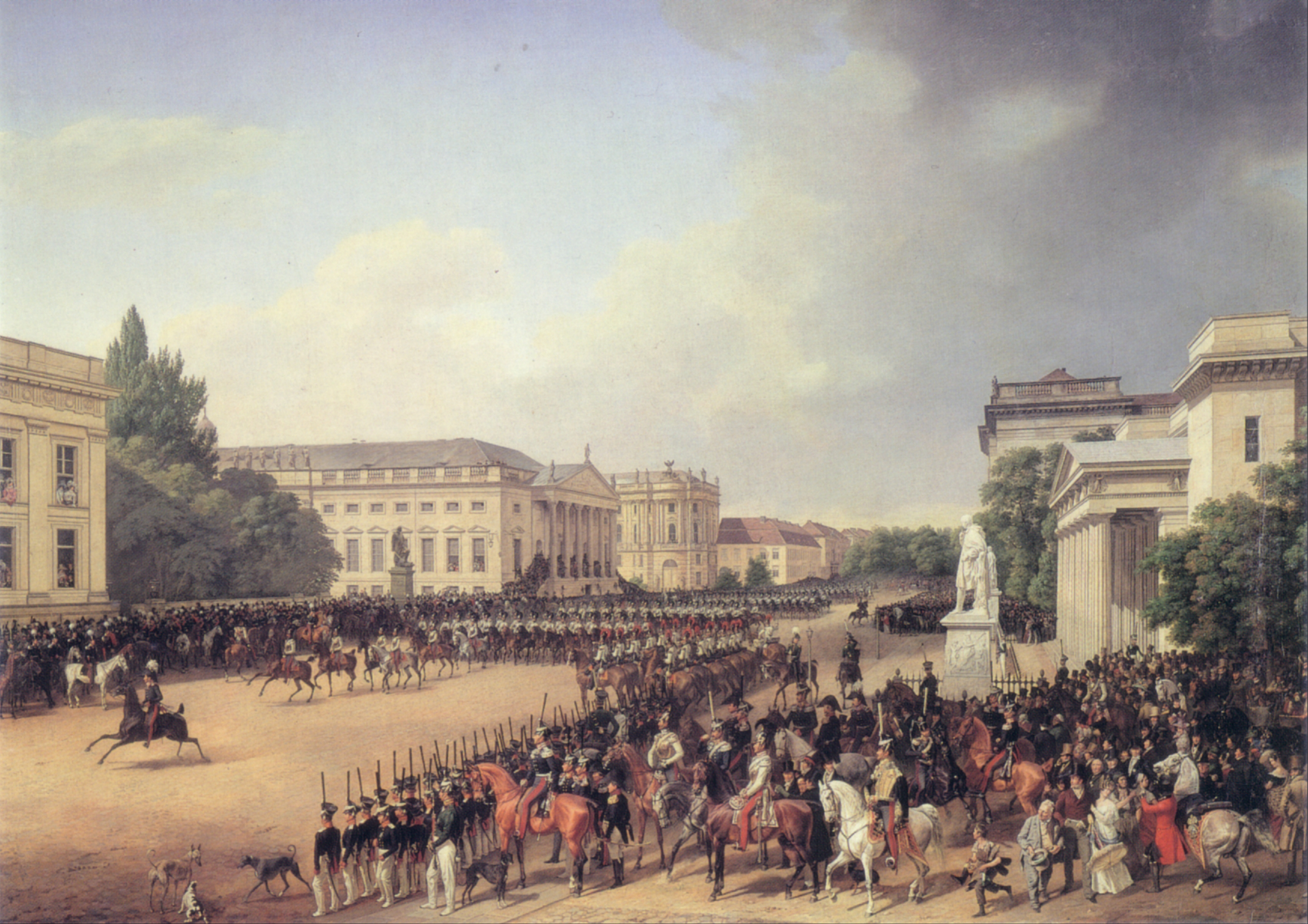
Parade on Opernplatz (by Franz Krüger, between 1824 and 1830). In the very background the planting with the linden trees begins towards the Brandenburg Gate.

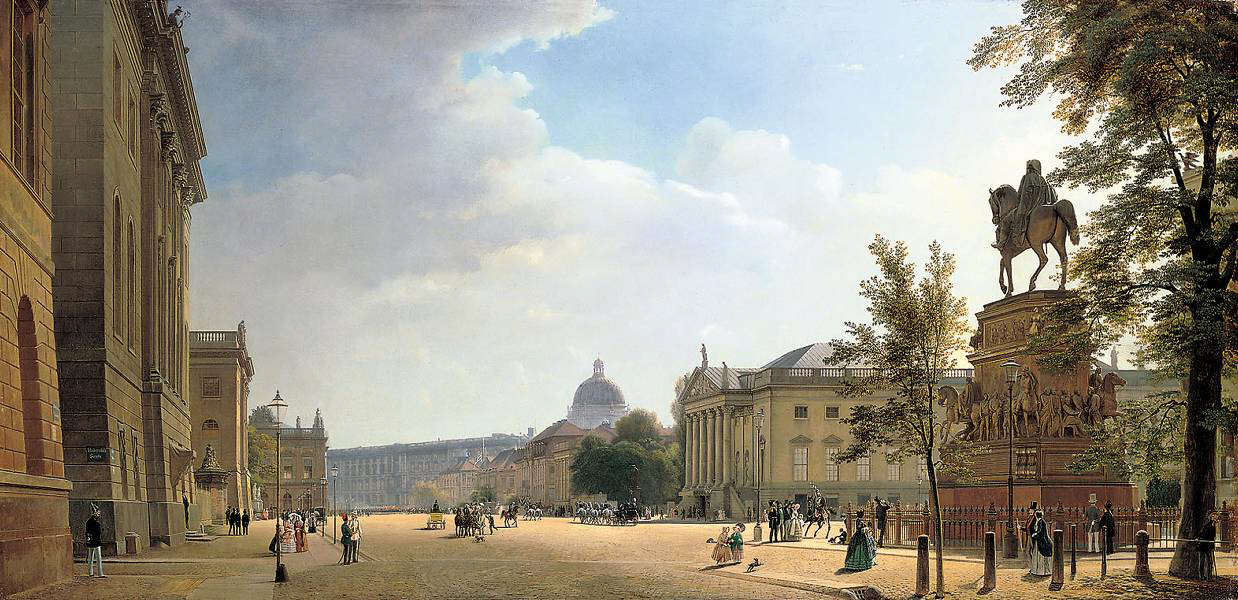
Unter den Linden (by Eduard Gaertner, 1852). In the background is the Berlin Palace.

Unter den Linden, which sits at the heart of the historic section of Berlin, developed from a bridle path laid out by Elector John George of Brandenburg in the 16th century to reach his hunting grounds in the Tiergarten from his palace. It was replaced by a boulevard of linden trees when the Electress Dorothea Sophie planned a new suburb in 1674, named after her Dorotheenstadt. She is said to have planted the first linden tree in 1680. Parts of the fortification of Berlin built in the aftermath of the Thirty Years' War (the baroque Berlin Fortress) were later integrated into the boulevard, around the historic Opernplatz, the present-day Bebelplatz, visible until today as there are no trees on this stretch up to the palace on the Spree river island itself. Bebelplatz itself was planned by Frederick the Great as a much larger Forum Fridericianum, albeit on a smaller scale actually realized with his State Opera, St. Hedwig's Cathedral, the Old Library Building and the Palace of Prince Henry, today the main building of Humboldt University, giving the square an almost complete surround of 18th-century buildings.

Aerial view of the park after World War II

By the 19th century, as Berlin grew and expanded to the west, Unter den Linden became the most renowned and grandest street in Berlin. In 1851 the famous equestrian statue of Frederick the Great, designed by Christian Daniel Rauch, was erected on the central strip. Johann Strauss III wrote the waltz "Unter den Linden" in 1900. In the course of the building of the Nord-Süd-Tunnel for the Berlin S-Bahn in 1934-1935, most of the linden trees were cut down and during the last days of World War II the remaining trees were destroyed or cut down for firewood. The present-day linden were replanted in the 1950s.

As the location of the pre-1914 German Foreign Ministry building, "the Unter den Linden" was sometimes used as a shorthand for the German government when talking of German foreign policy.

== Historic significance ==
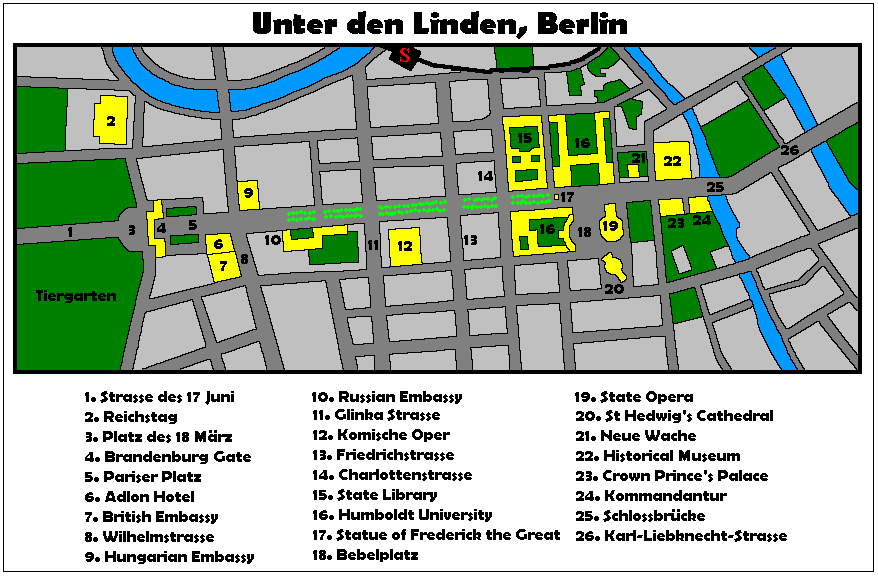
Map showing the main points of interest

Since 1937, the numbering of the properties on the street has started at the Schlossbrücke (Palace Bridge), which connects Unter den Linden with the Lustgarten and Museum Island. The reconstructed Alte Kommandantur is at No. 1, standing opposite the Zeughaus arsenal, the oldest building on Unter den Linden, built between 1695 and 1706, now the seat of the Deutsches Historisches Museum, No. 2. Buildings along the street include (from east to west) the Crown Prince's Palace which is the former palace of the House of Hohenzollern, at No. 3, opposite the Neue Wache war memorial, No. 4, Karl Friedrich Schinkel's masterpiece built in 1817. Further along, on Bebelplatz, the Berlin State Opera, No. 7, colloquially called Lindenoper, St. Hedwig's Cathedral and the Altes Palais, No. 9, (Old Palace, Berlin) a favourite Neoclassical residence of Emperor Wilhelm I; next, on the north side lies the main building of the Humboldt University, No. 6, and House I of the Berlin State Library, No. 8.

At the western end are the Russian Embassy (former Soviet Embassy, Nos. 63-65, the Hungarian Embassy, No. 76, standing at the junction with Wilhelmstrasse, and finally the Hotel Adlon, No. 77, at the corner of Pariser Platz, which has been completely rebuilt on the site of the pre-war hotel. Well-known statues of Alexander and Wilhelm von Humboldt in front of the university as well as of the Prussian generals Scharnhorst and Bülow, also adorn the street. A street sign carrying the name Unter den Linden dating from before the 1930s was taken away by British forces and can now be seen at the Imperial War Museum, London.

== Well-known buildings and places along the street and in its immediate vicinity ==
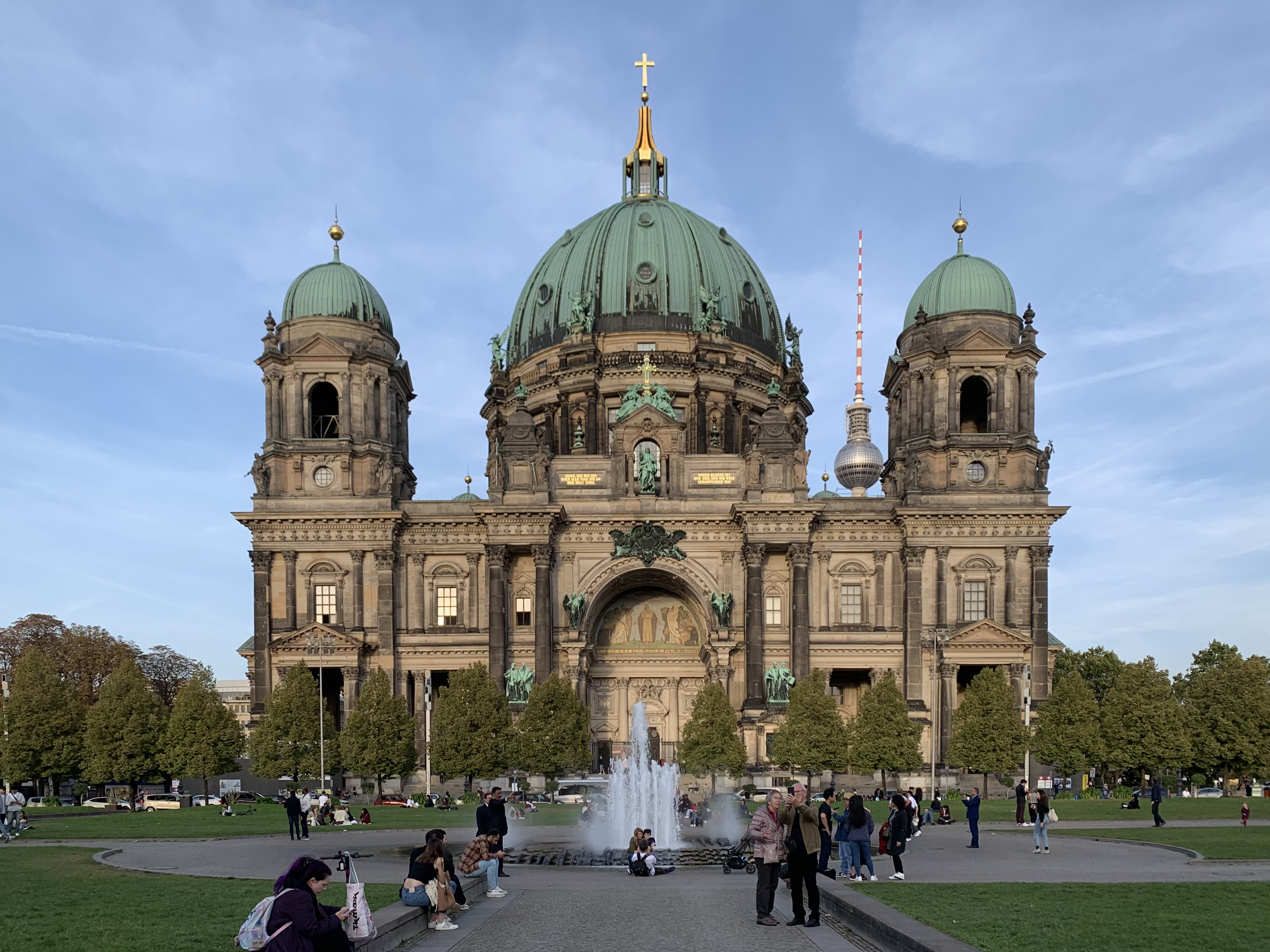
Berlin Cathedral

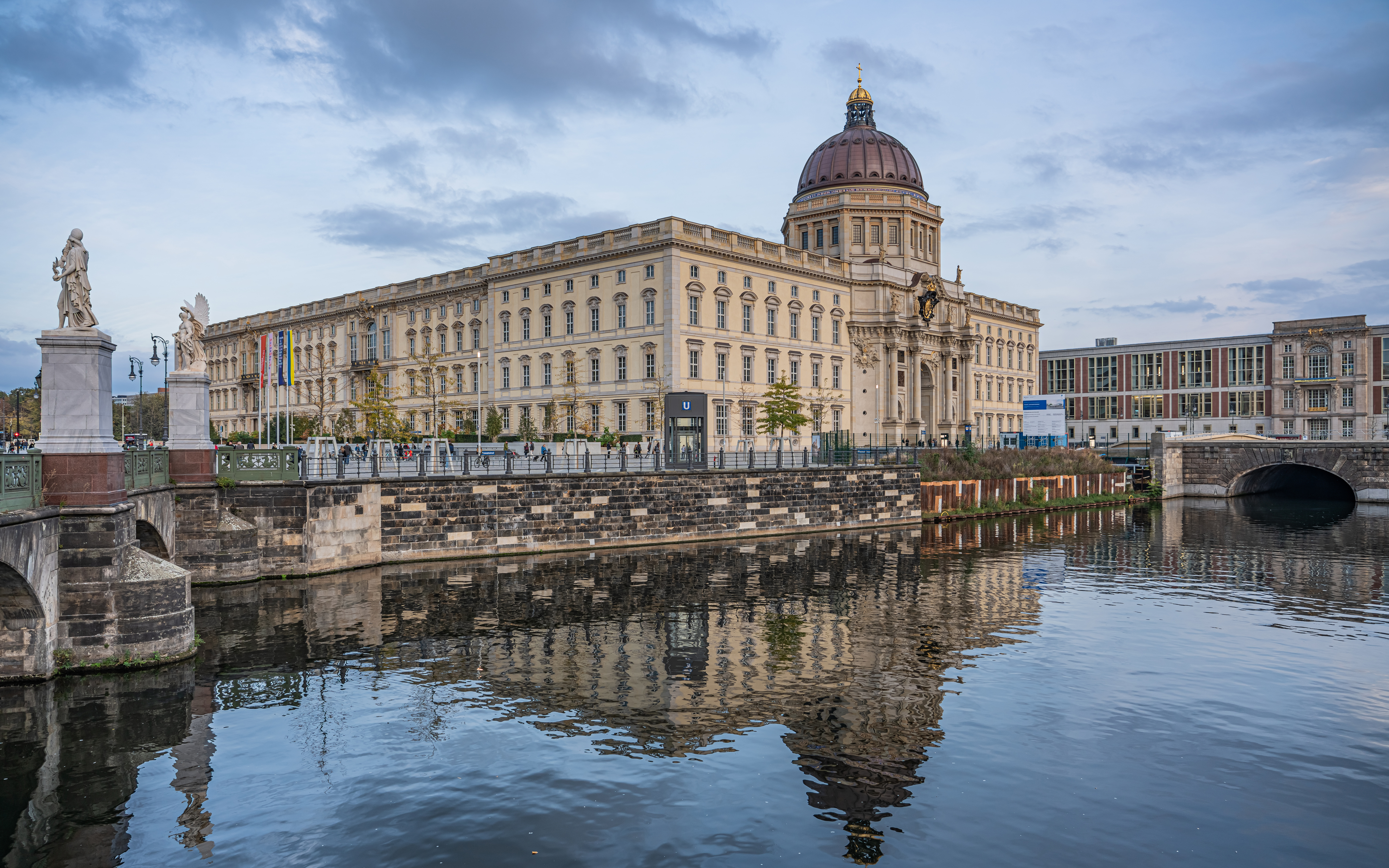
Berlin Palace / Humboldt Forum

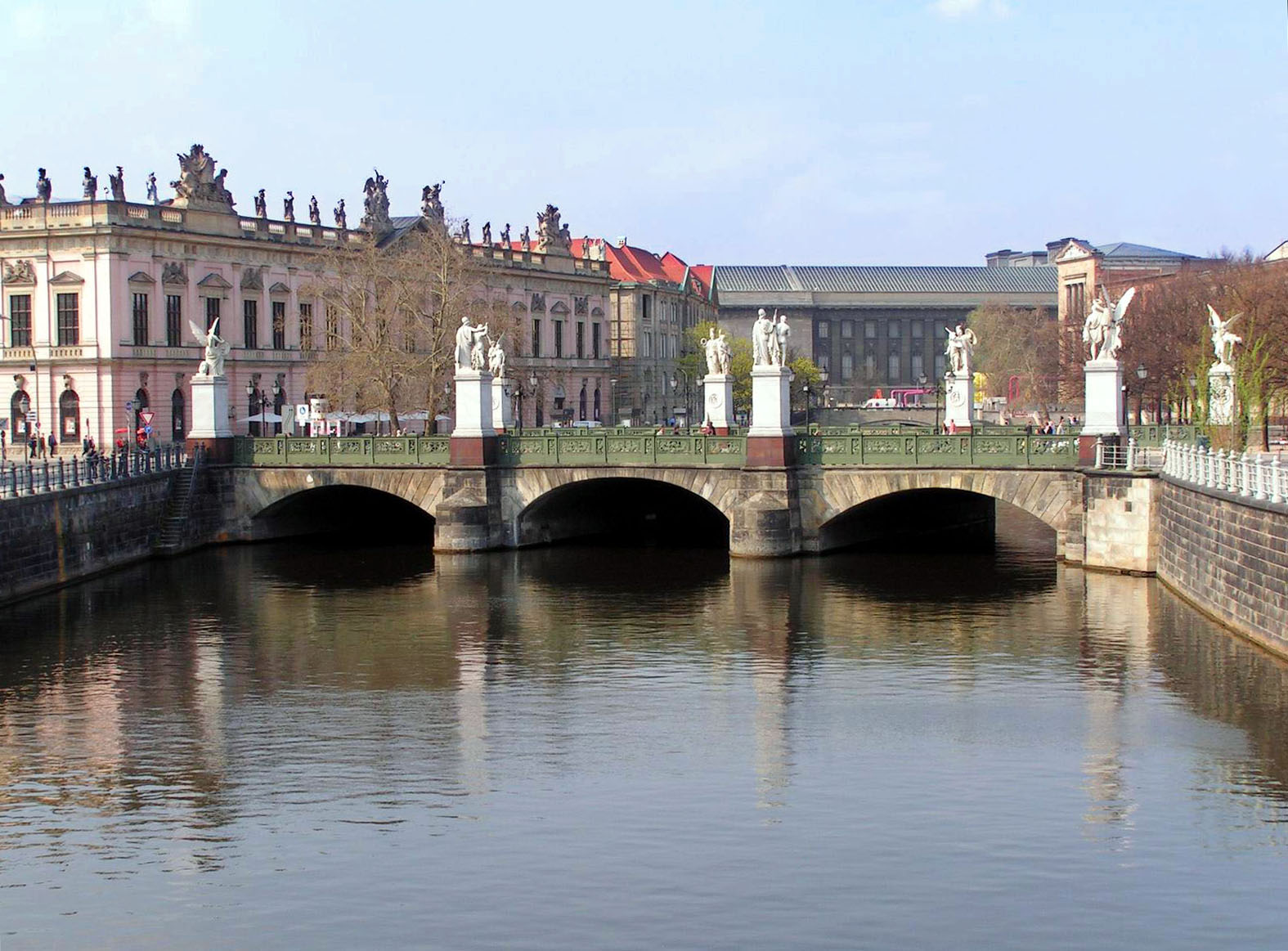
Eastern end at Schlossbrücke (Palace Bridge)

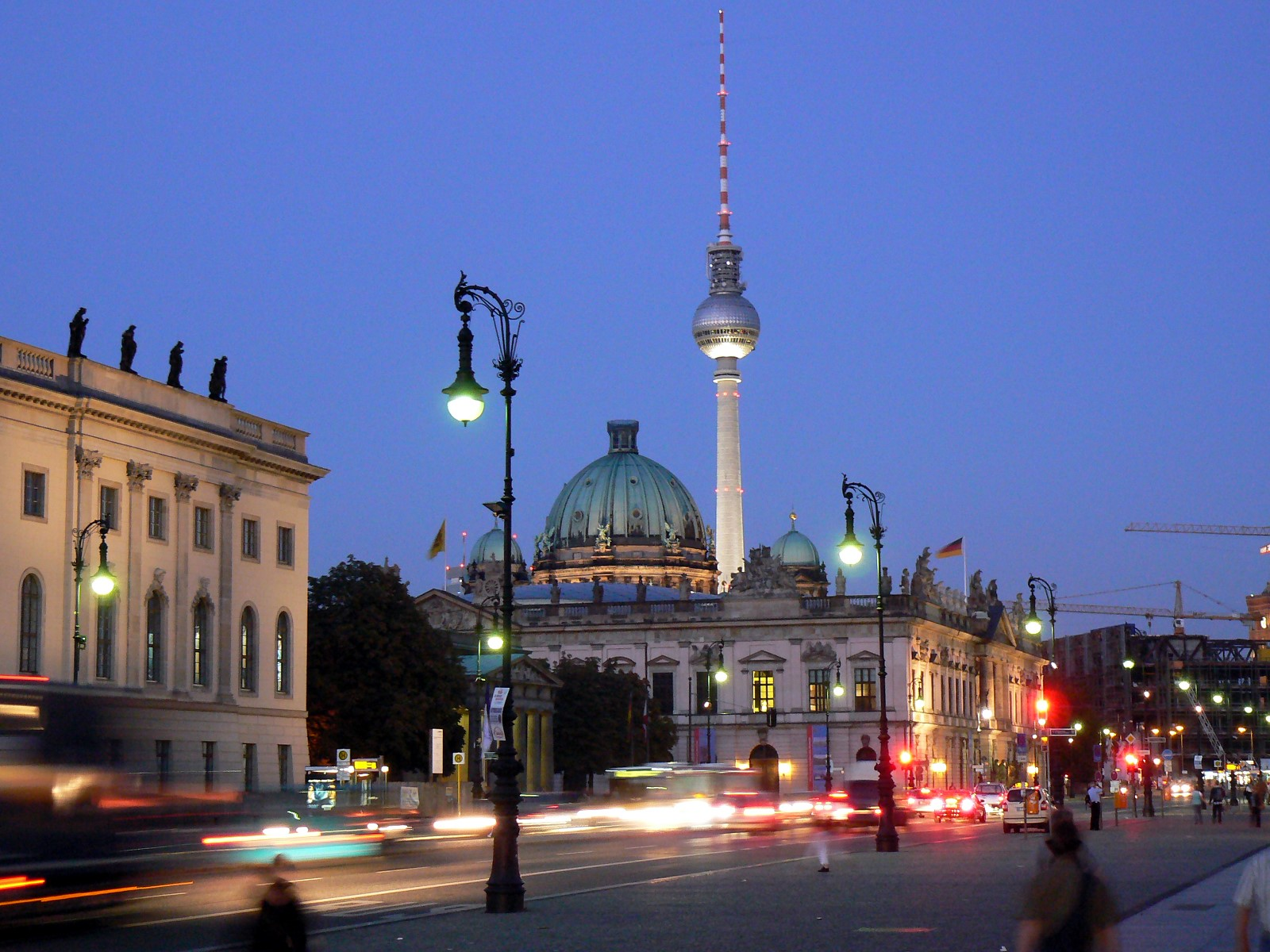
Unter den Linden at night

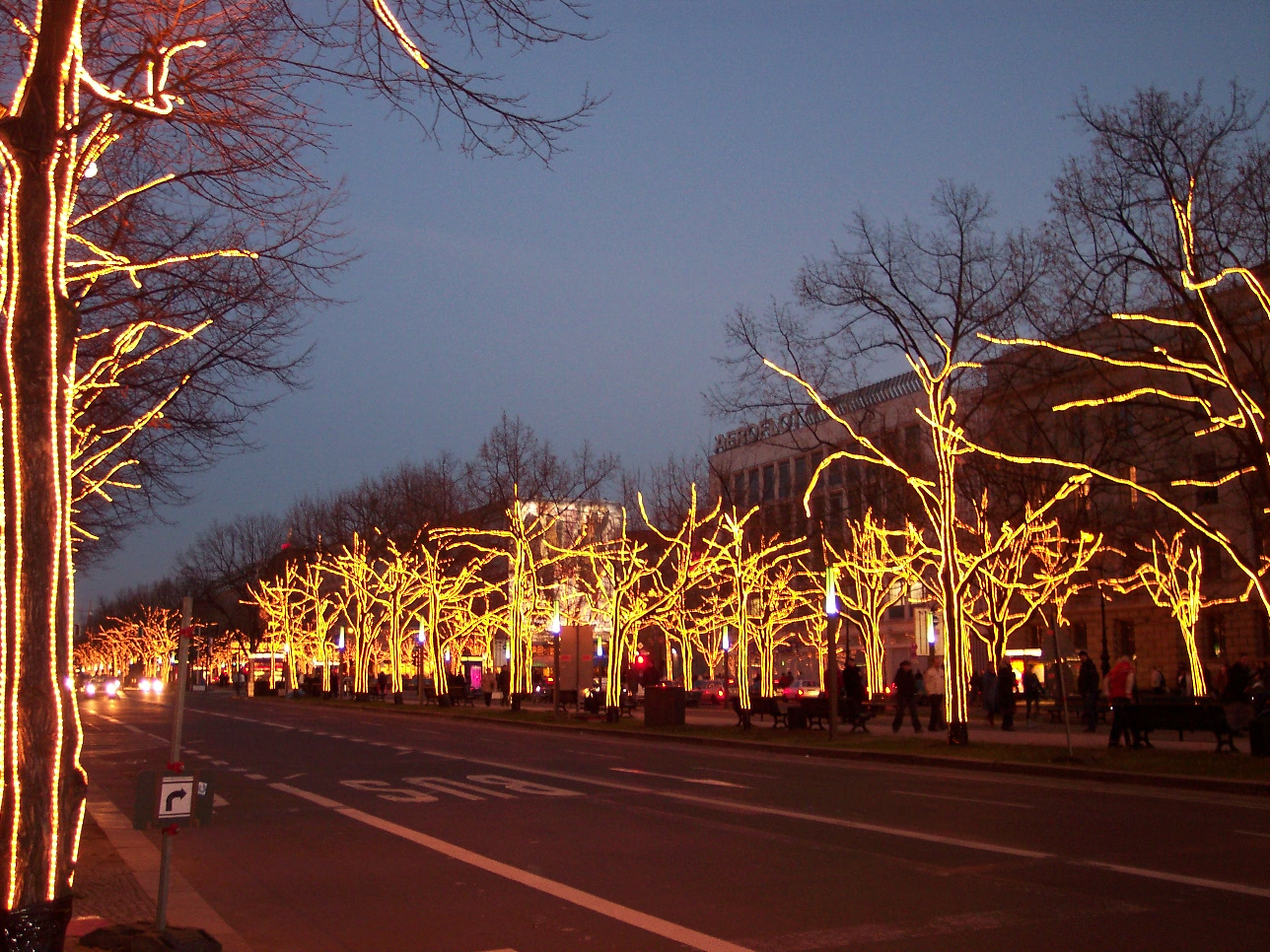
Christmas illumination

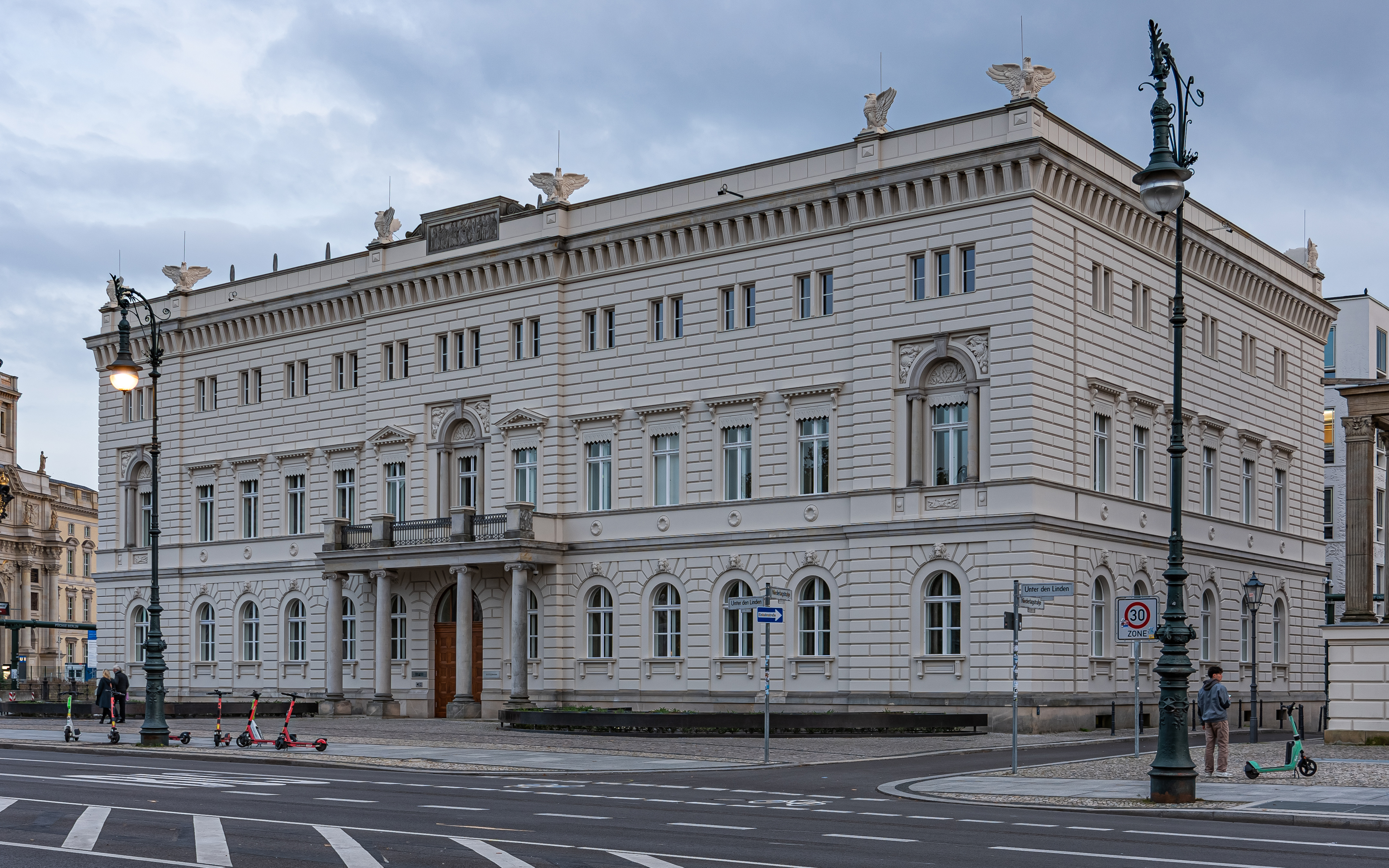
Alte Kommandantur

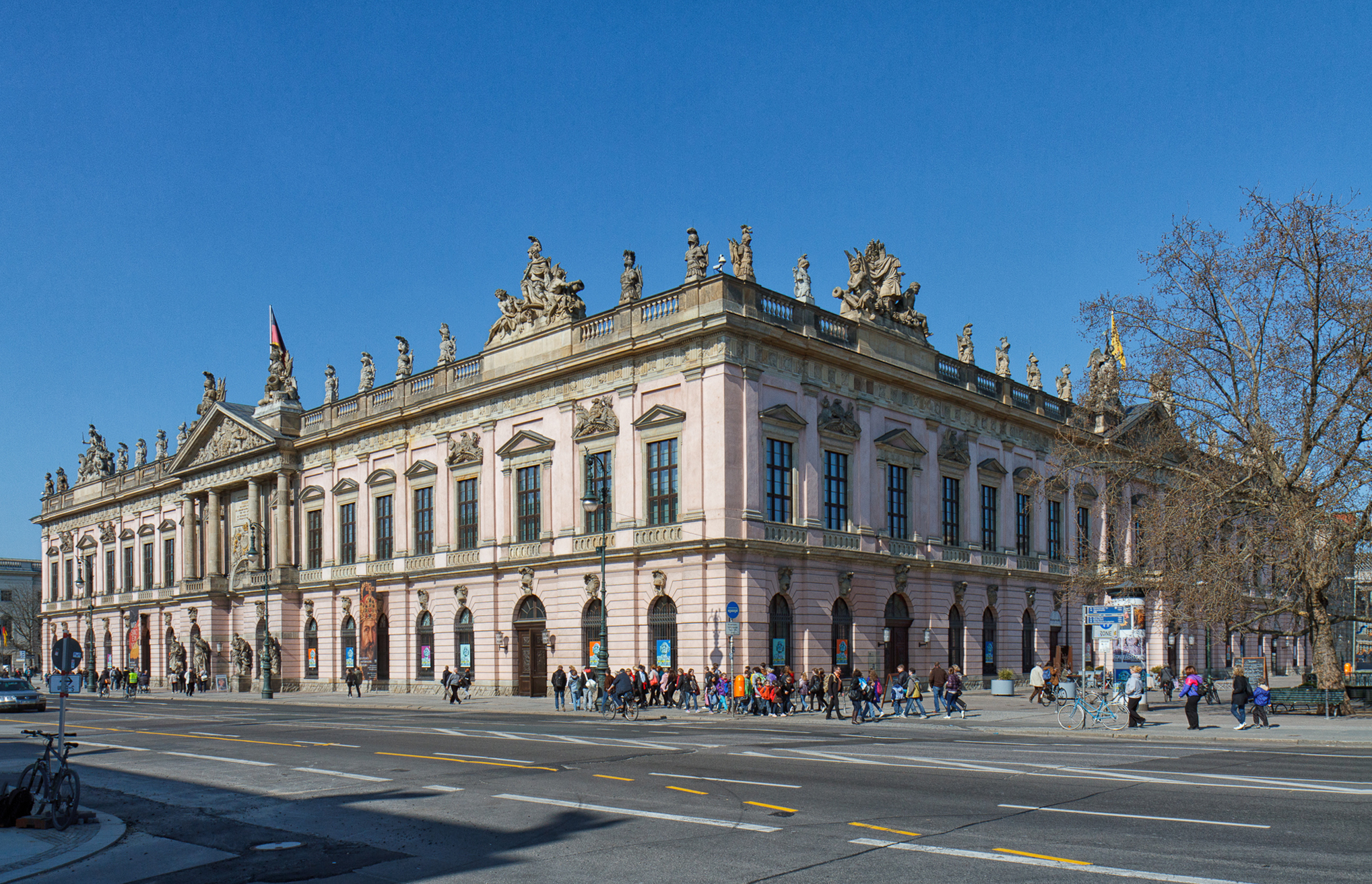
Zeughaus (now Deutsches Historisches Museum)

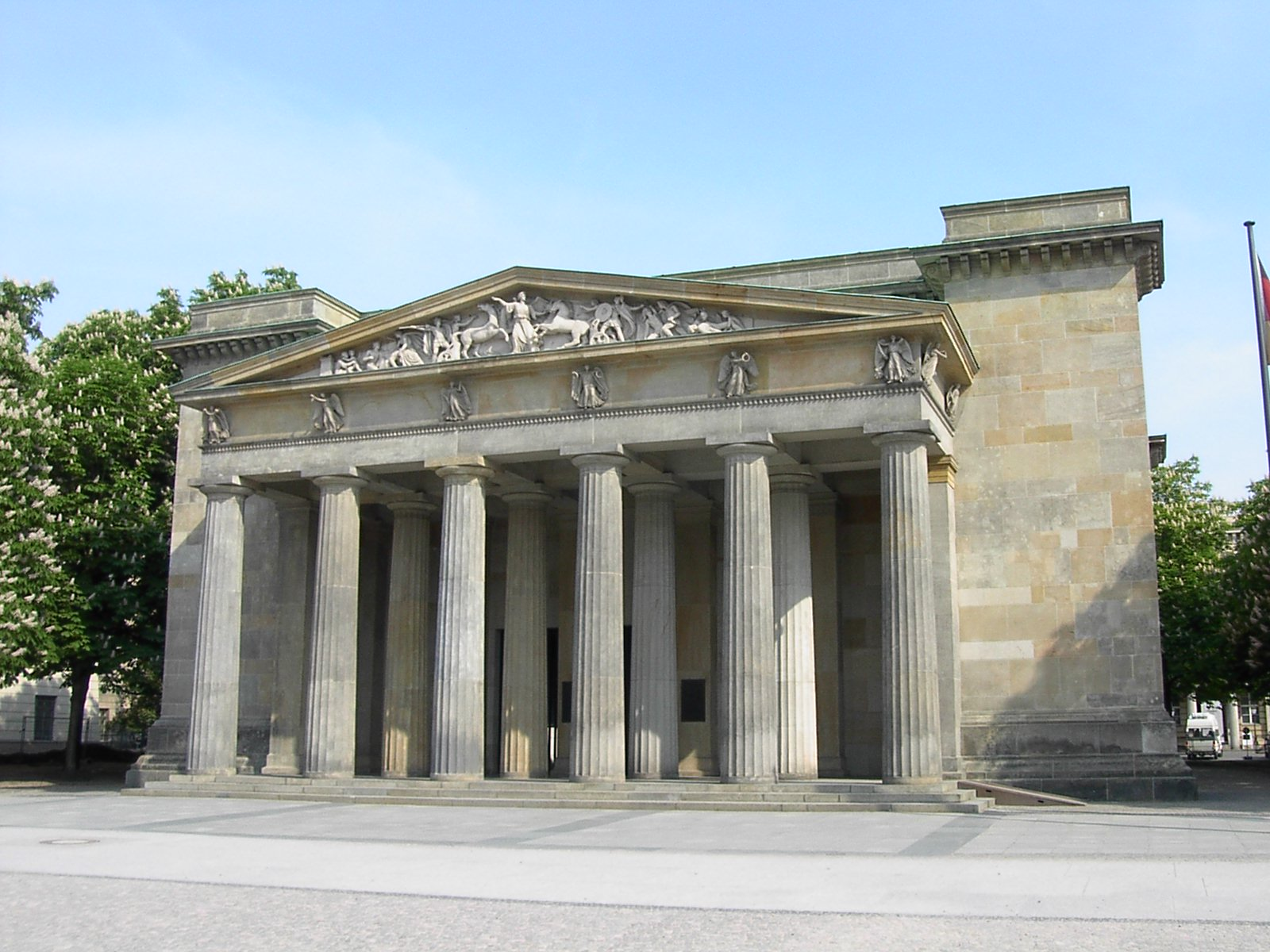
Neue Wache

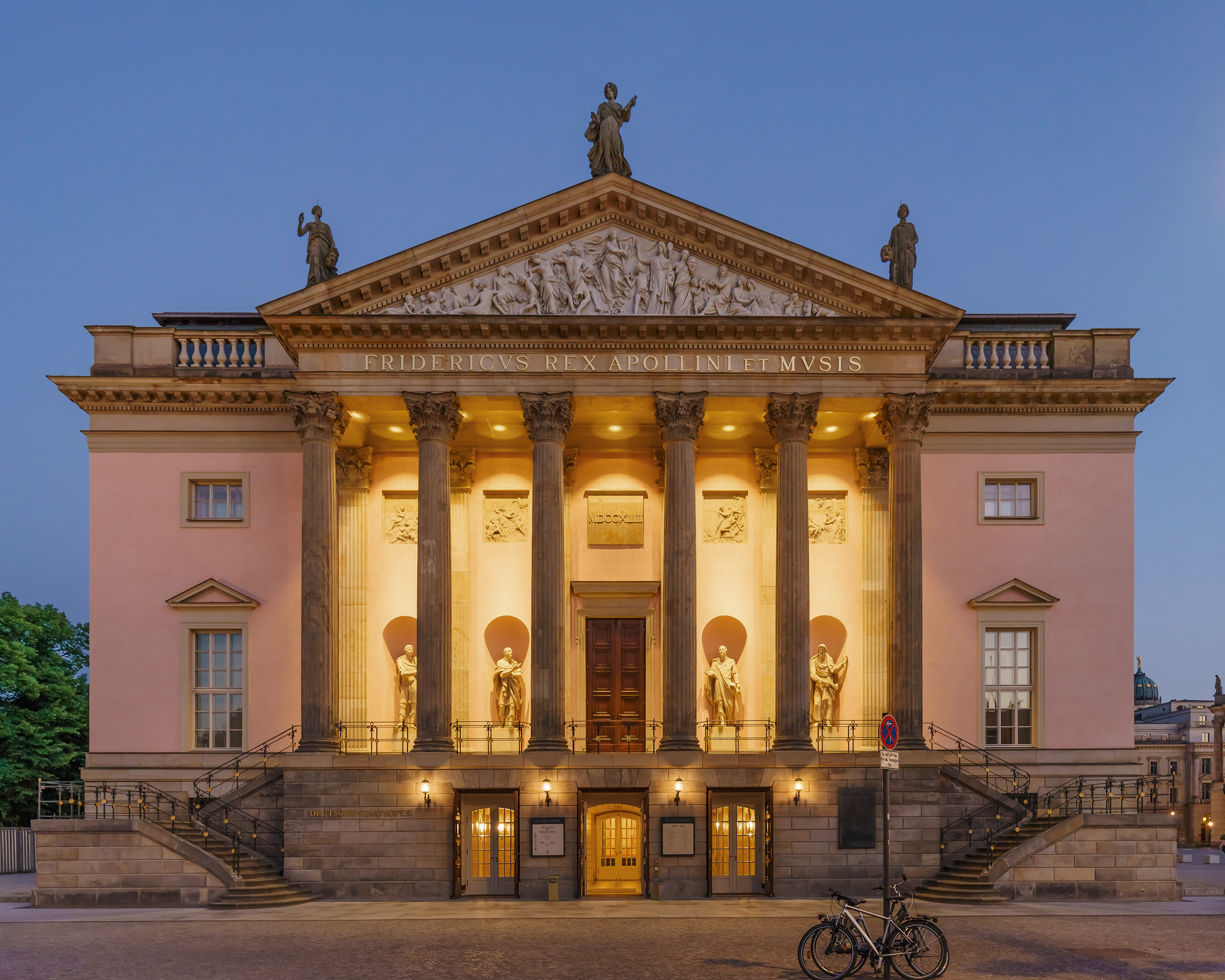
Berlin State Opera, one of several neoclassical buildings on Bebelplatz

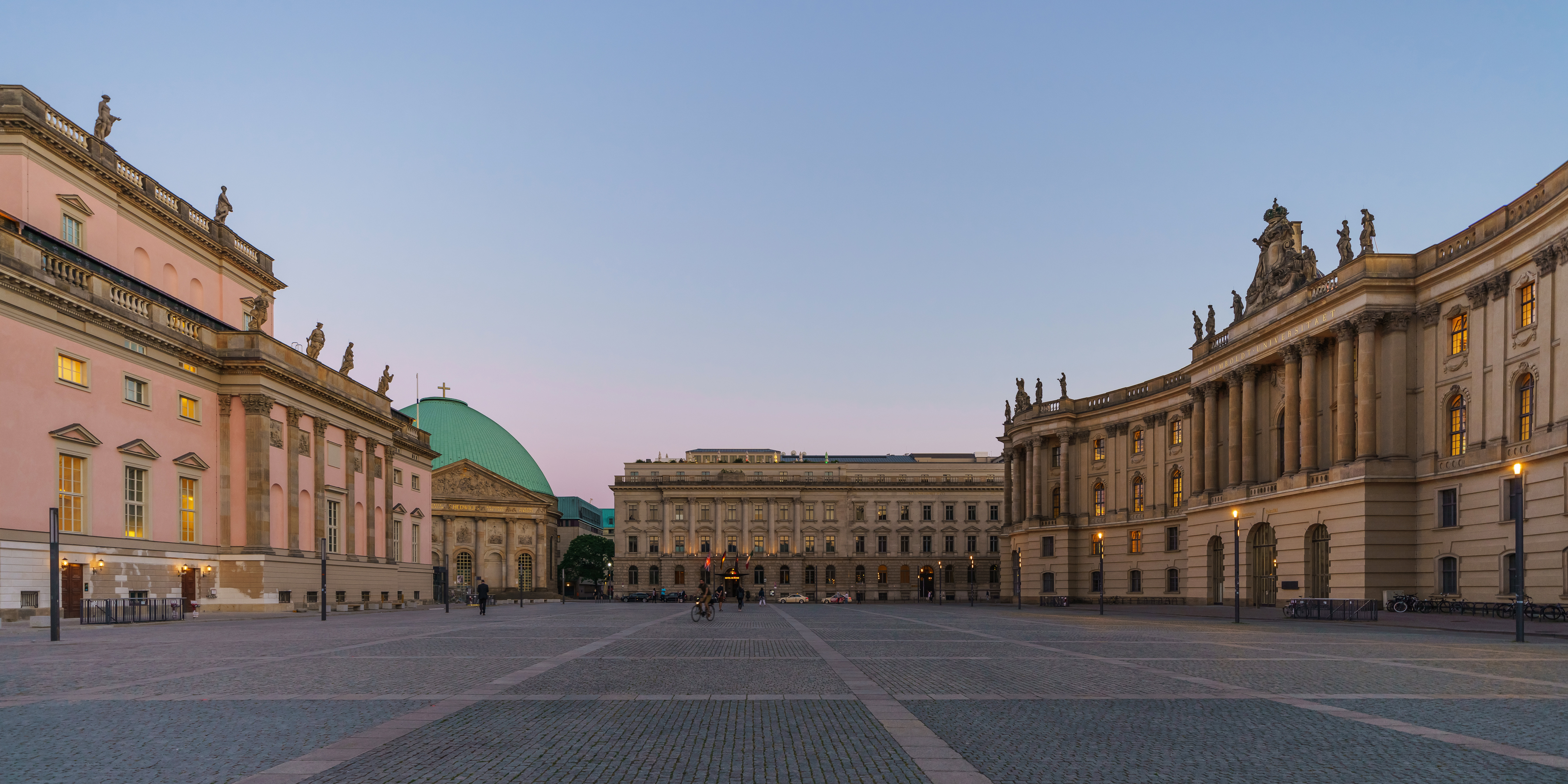
Bebelplatz

Main building of Humboldt University

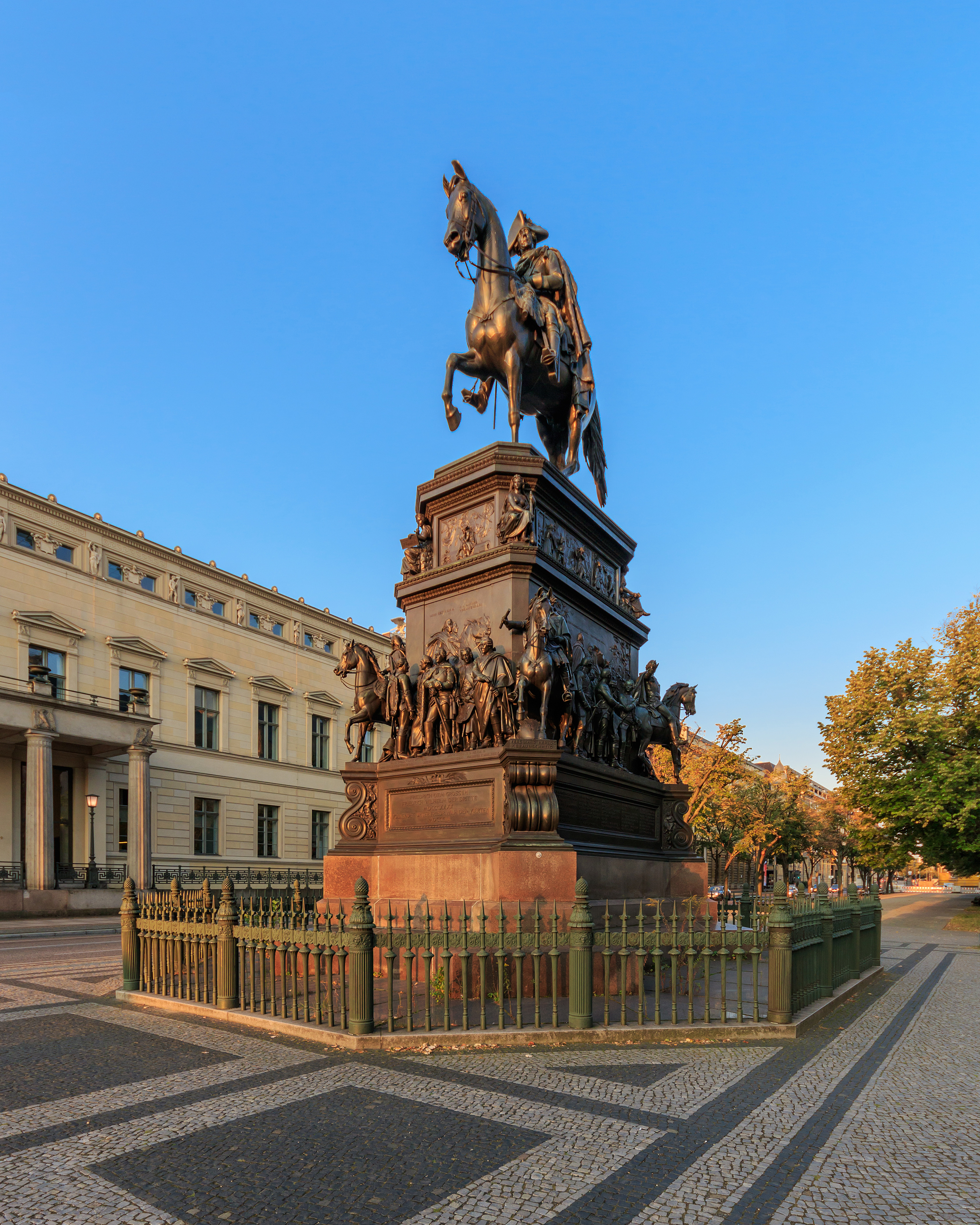
Equestrian statue of Frederick the Great, facing east

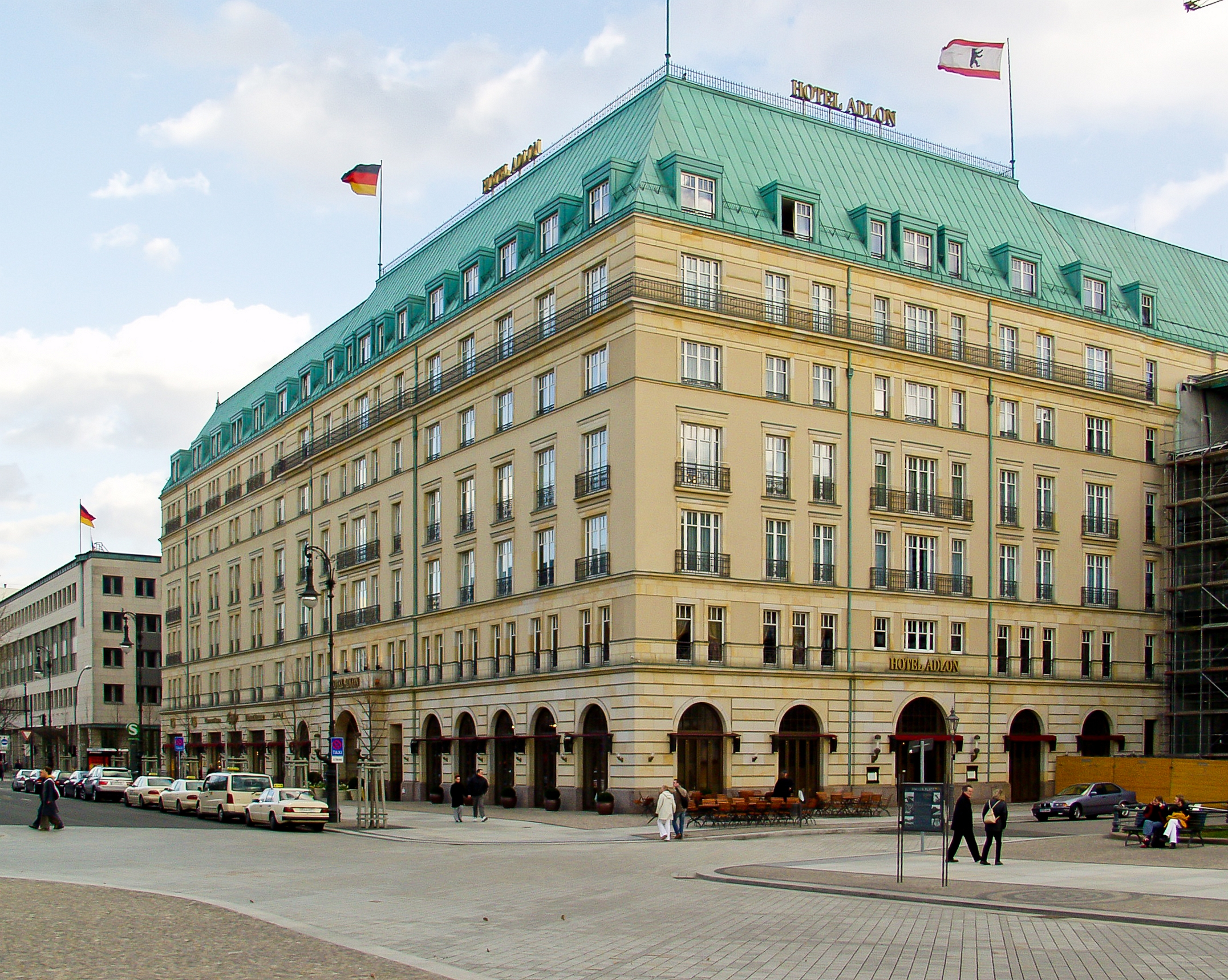
Hotel Adlon

Brandenburg Gate at Pariser Platz, which marks the western terminus

== See also ==
- Berlin Brandenburger Tor station – formerly Berlin Unter den Linden
- Berlin Unter den Linden station – U-Bahn station at the Friedrichstraße intersection, served by U5 and U6 trains
