= Bauakademie =

Former architecture and engineering school in Berlin

Coordinates: 52°30′58″N 13°23′56″E

- Schinkelsche Bauakademie
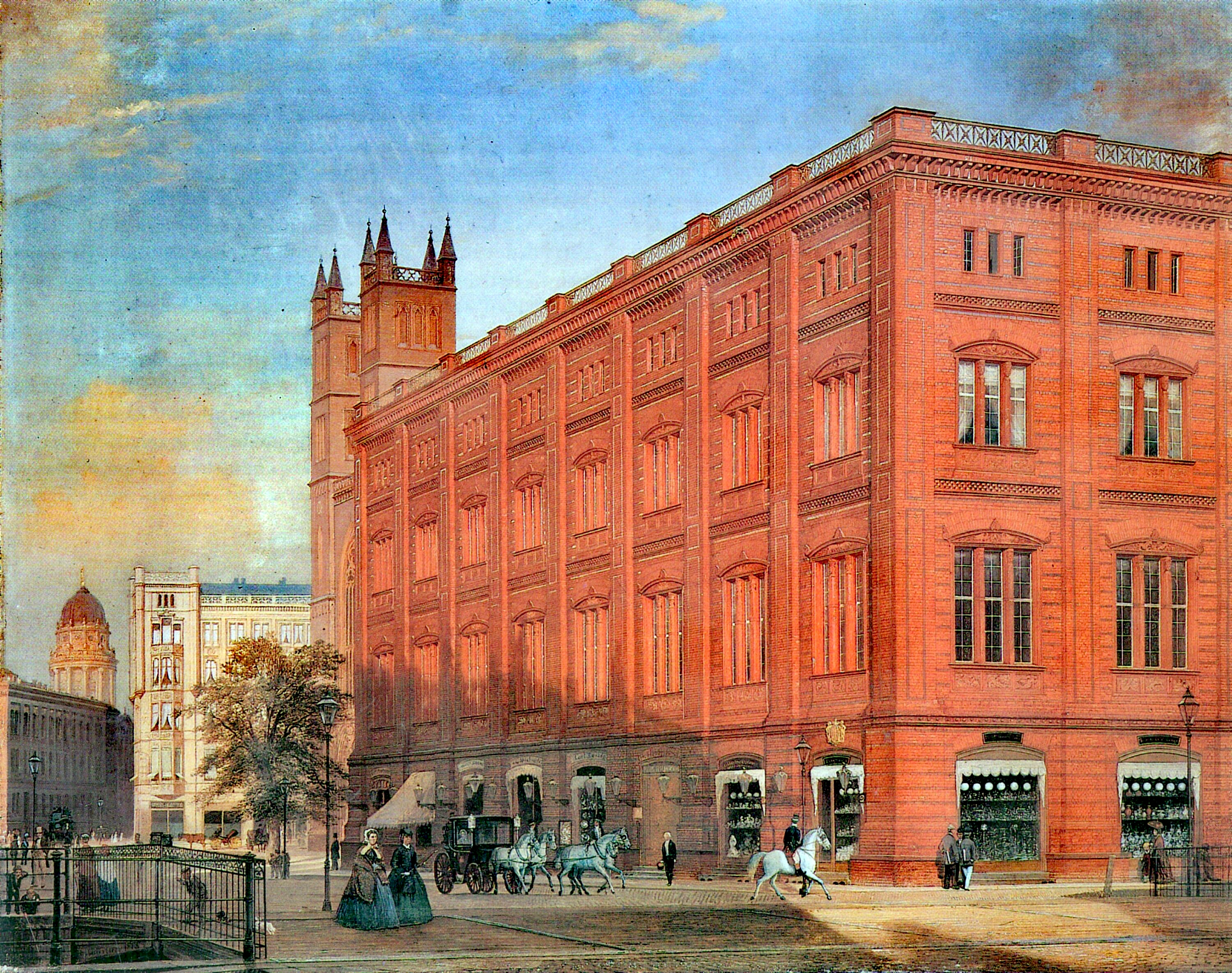
- "Bauakademie", Painting by Eduard Gaertner, 1868

General information
- Status: Reconstruction pending
- Type: Higher education institution / Architecture museum
- Architectural style: Red-brick Proto-modernism / Neoclassical
- Location: Werderscher Markt, Mitte, Berlin, Germany
- Named for: Karl Friedrich Schinkel
- Year built: 1832–1836
- Completed: 1836
- Demolished: 1962 (Destroyed in WWII, 1945)
- Cost: €62 million (reconstruction estimate)
- Owner: Federal Foundation for the Building Academy

Technical details
- Material: Red brick, terracotta

Design and construction
- Architect: Karl Friedrich Schinkel
- Known for: Forerunner of modern architecture; iconic red brick facade.

Website
- bundesstiftung-bauakademie.de

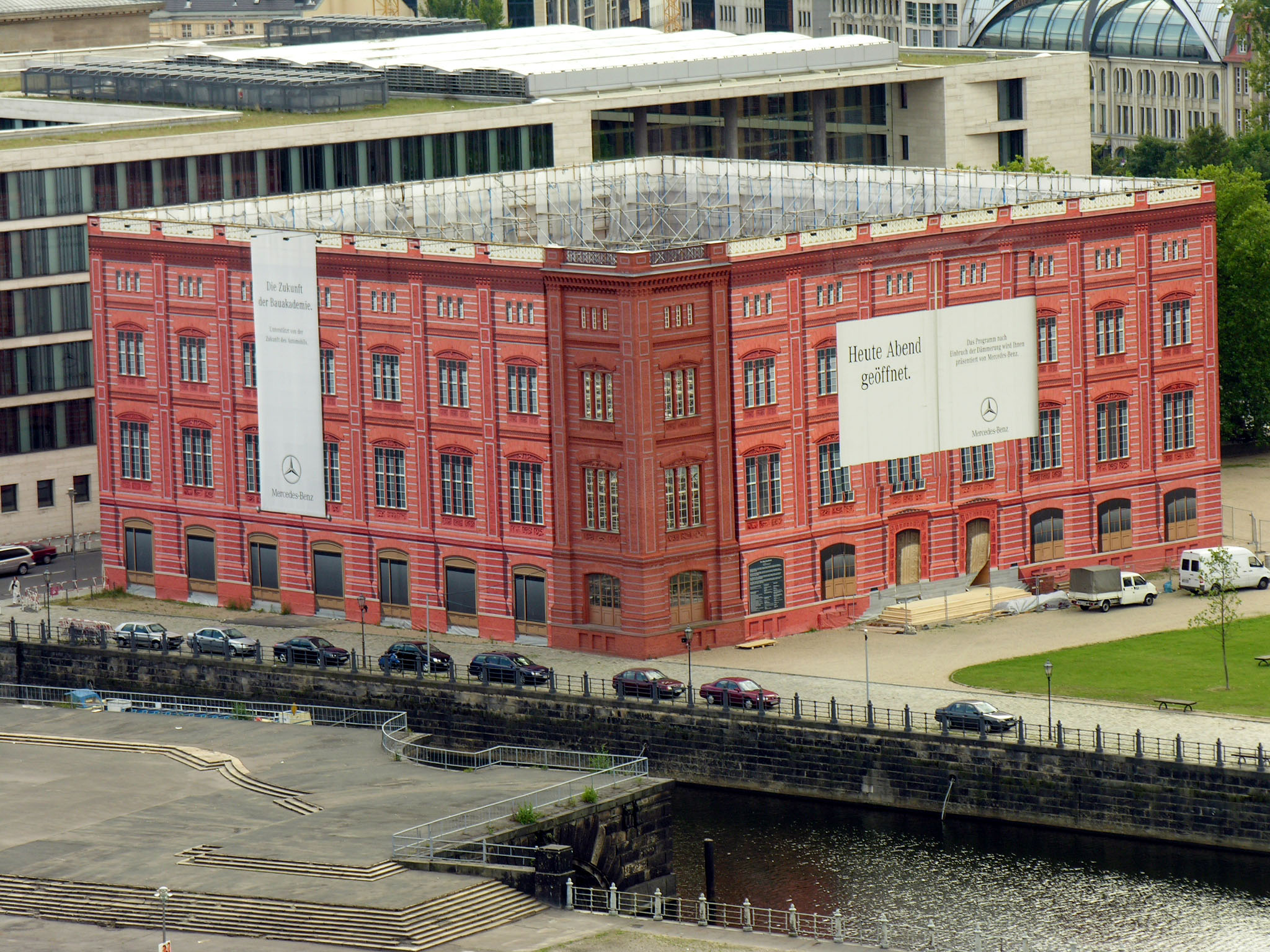
Mock canvas reconstruction in 2005

The Bauakademie (Building Academy, also known as the Schinkelsche Bauakademie) in Berlin, Germany, was a higher education institution for the art of building to train master builders. Founded on 18 March 1799 by King Frederick William III, the institution originated from the construction department of the Academy of Fine Arts and Mechanical Sciences (from 1704), which emphasized the aesthetic elements of the art of building while ignoring the technical. Thus, the governmental Upper Building Department ("UBD") decided to establish an entirely new building educational institution named "Bauakademie". In 1801, the institution was incorporated into the UBD.

An iconic building in the history of engineering and architecture for its red brick facade, the Bauakademie was designed by German architect Karl Friedrich Schinkel between 1832 and 1836. Its red brick façade was considered an early basis for modernist architectural styles. In 1945, the building was destroyed during World War II. Despite the fact that reconstruction efforts had already begun, it was demolished in 1962. Following the decision by the German Bundestag in 2016, a Federal Foundation for the Building Academy was established in 2019 to facilitate the reconstruction of the building.

== History ==
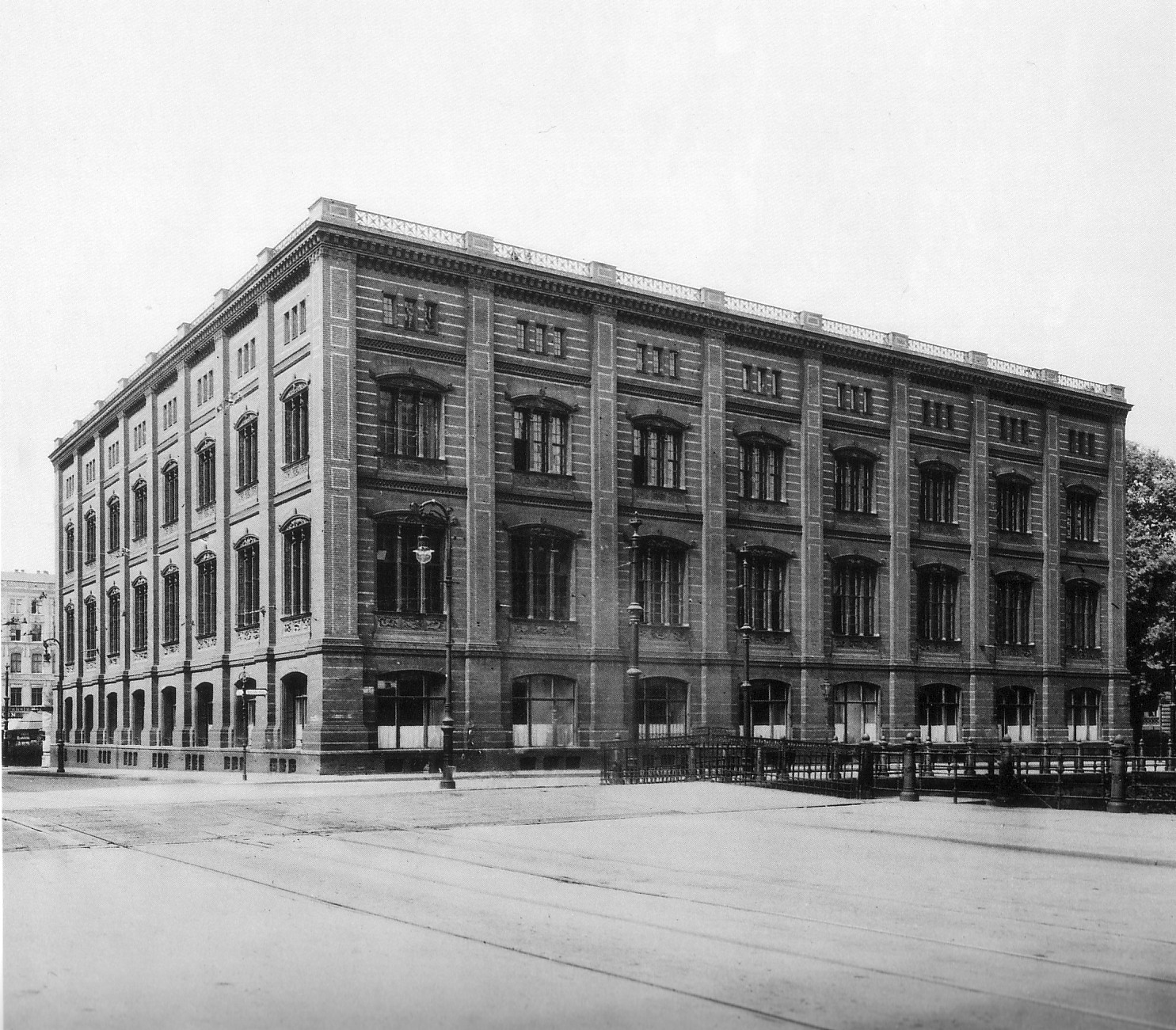
Bauakademie, 1888

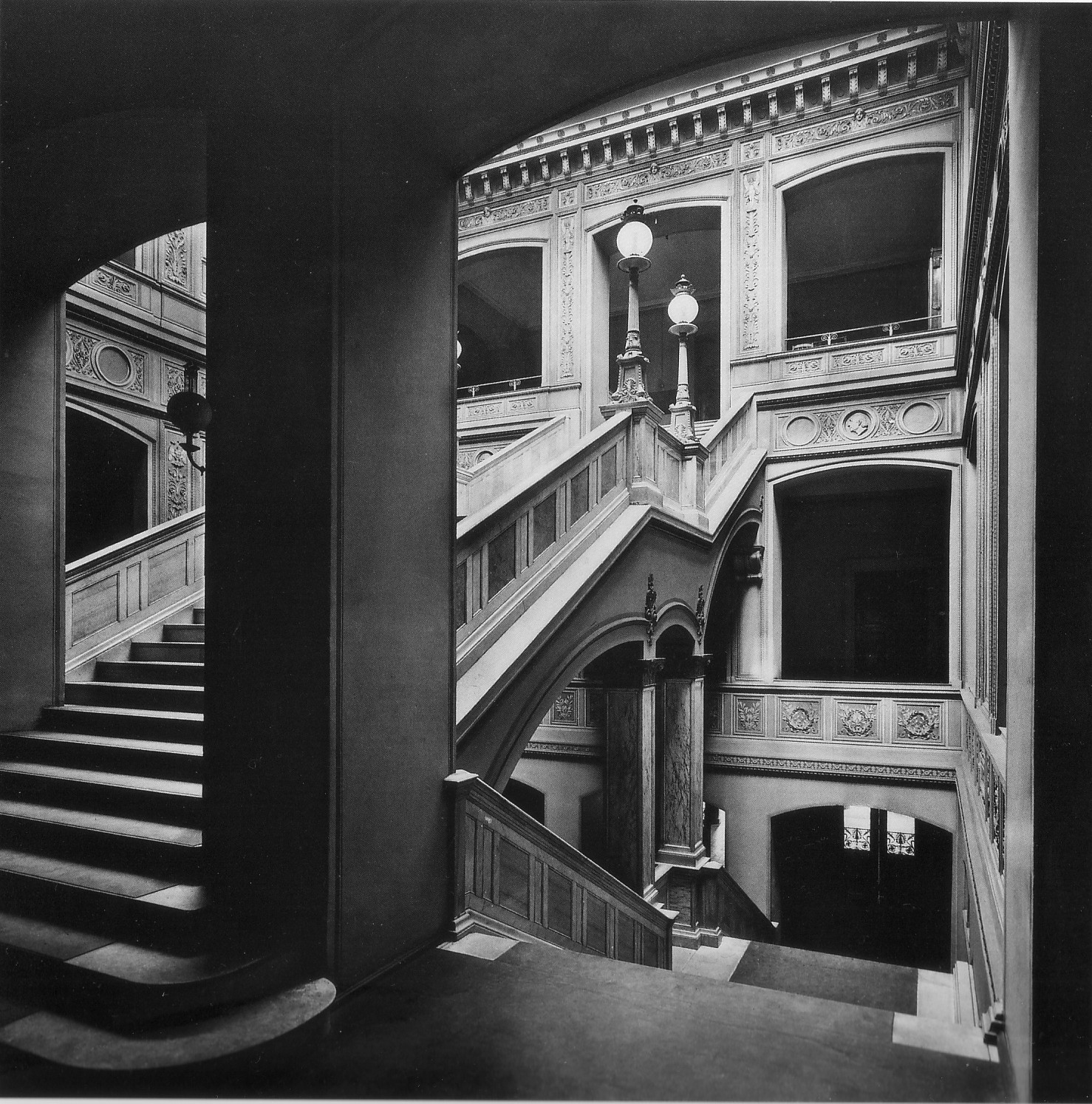
Staircase, 1911

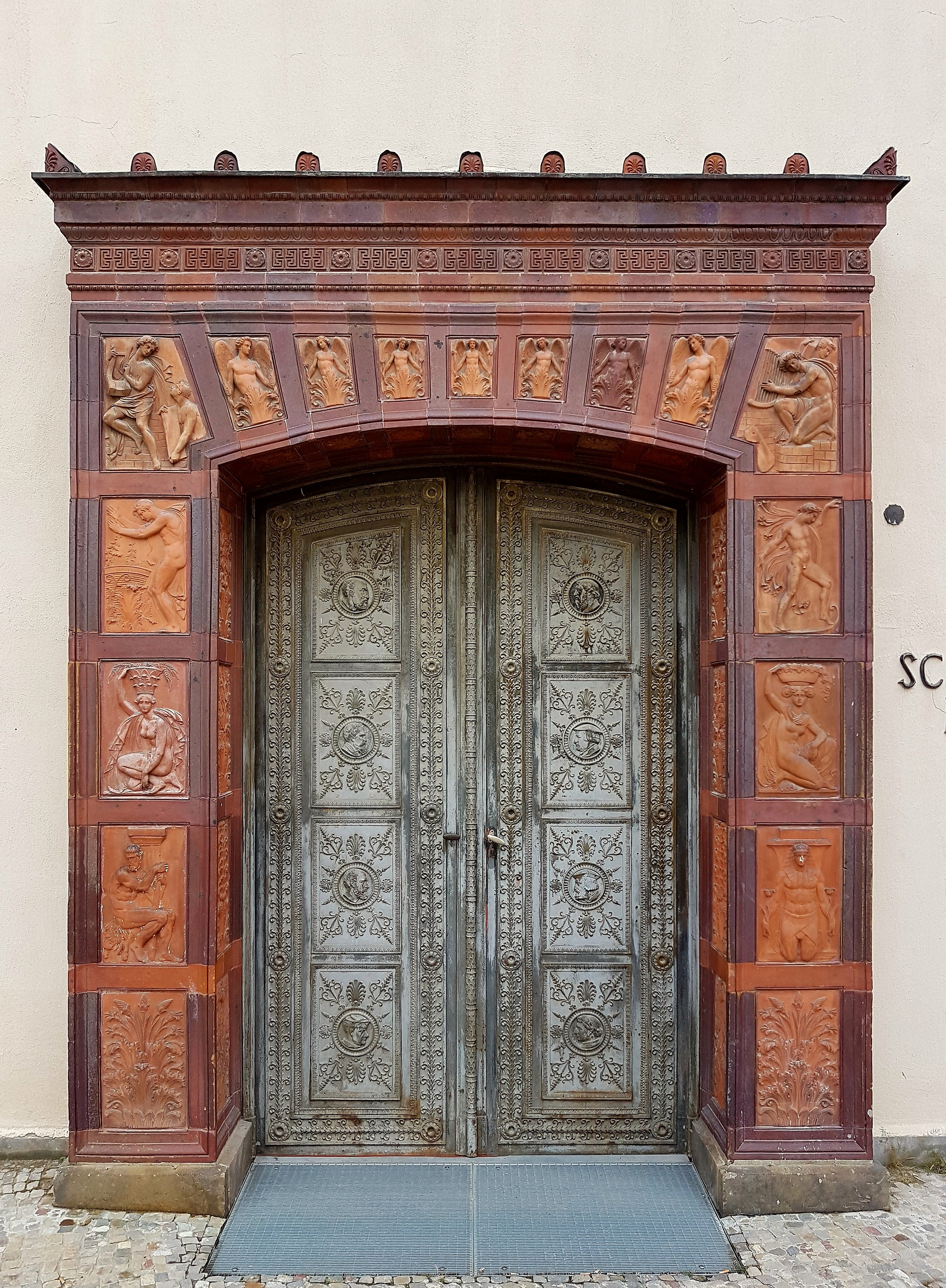
Original portal of the Bauakademie, installed in the Schinkelklause at the Kronprinzenpalais

The building of the Building Academy (Bauakademie), built between 1832 and 1836 (later known as Schinkel's Bauakademie), is considered one of the forerunners of modern architecture due to its hithertofore uncommon use of red brick and the relatively streamlined facade of the building. Designed by Karl Friedrich Schinkel, it was built near the Berlin City Palace and accommodated two royal Prussian institutions: the State Construction Commission (Oberbaudeputation), of which Schinkel was the director, and – first of all – the Building Academy (institution), which in 1879 gave birth to the Königlich Technische Hochschule Charlottenburg (eng: Royal Technical Higher School) – the forerunner of Technische Universität Berlin.

For nearly 50 years (1885–1933), the Bauakademie became the home of the "Königlich Preussische Messbild-Anstalt" renamed to "Staatliche Bildstelle" in 1921. This institution, under its director Albrecht Meydenbauer, became the first world-wide office professionally working with photogrammetry and establishing an archive of historical buildings based on photography. By 1920, approximately 20.000 glass-negatives of the format 30x30 cm and 40x40 cm had been collected in Germany and abroad.

During the Weimar period, the Bauakademie was the home of the famous Deutsche Hochschule für Politik as well as other institutions supported by the State of Prussia.

Damaged during World War II, the Bauakademie was then partially restored, but in 1962 the building was demolished to make room for the future Ministry of Foreign Affairs of East Germany.

In 1995, the Ministry of Foreign Affairs of East Germany was demolished in order to recreate the Werderscher Markt area. Since then, proposals to rebuild Schinkel's Bauakademie have been discussed with city and Federal authorities. The Werderscher Markt area has already been partially recreated by the Bertelsmann-funded reconstruction of the Alte Kommandantur. As for the Bauakademie, between 2000 and 2001 students erected a temporary structure to give an impression of the volume and form of the building. On 11 November 2016, the German Bundestag decided to rebuild the building academy according to the motto "As much Schinkel as possible". The cost of the project is estimated at 51 million euros.

== Reconstruction ==
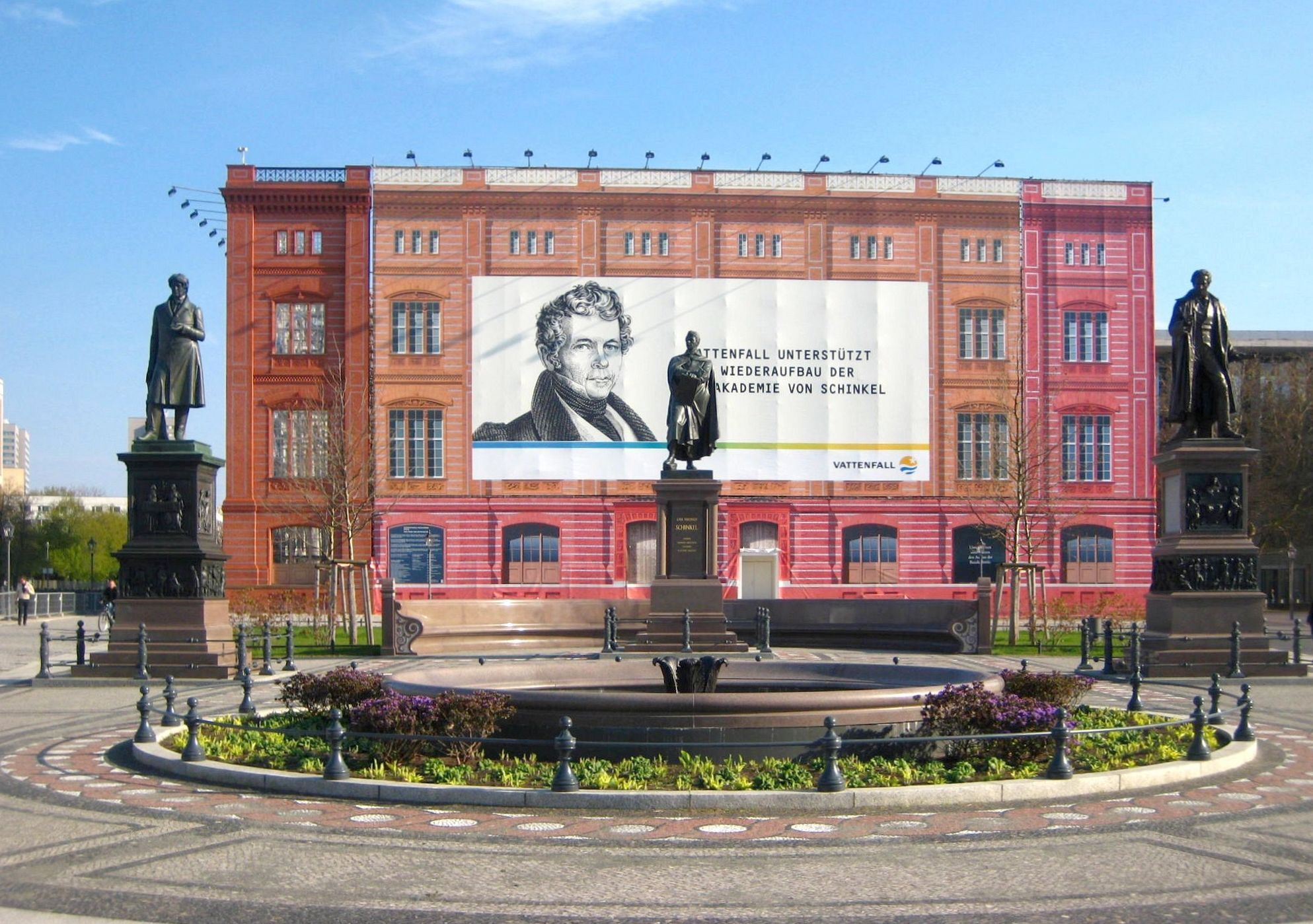
Mock reconstruction and giant posters, in front of the restored Schinkelplatz

After the GDR foreign ministry building was demolished in 1995–1996, there were increasing demands for a reconstruction of the Schinkel Building Academy. The Bauakademie sponsorship association, founded in 1994, suggested that it be rebuilt as an international innovation, exhibition and event center with adapted interiors and faithful facades. 2001–2002 the north-east corner was rebuilt as a model facade and the red hall as a model room for the building academy. Subsequently, the neighboring Schinkelplatz was restored in its historical form in 2007–2008. Between 2004 and 2019, a giant poster recreated the original exterior view of the Bauakademie, similar to the previous one of the City Palace.

In October 2016, the President of the Prussian Cultural Heritage Foundation, Hermann Parzinger, advocated for the reconstruction of the Bauakademie, with the proposal to use the building as an architecture museum. Berlin has architectural collections, such as those in the art library and the state library, in the architecture museum of Technische Universität Berlin, in the Academy of the Arts, and in the Berlinische Galerie, but no major architectural museums. "Isn't it a fascinating idea to finally bring all the treasures of these institutions together in one center?"

On 11 November 2016, the German Bundestag decided to release 62 million euros for the reconstruction of the building academy. It should be a "national showcase, forum and workshop in one" for current topics relating to architecture, construction and urban development as well as another cultural focus on Museum Island, which is "committed to the historical model and dedicated to all construction". In order to promote the reconstruction, the state of Berlin sold the property to the federal government. Construction is expected to start in 2021.

On 7 May 2018, the Federal Ministry of the Interior announced the results of an internationally open program competition for the building academy to be rebuilt. In August 2018, Berlin's Senator for Construction Katrin Lompscher (Die Linke) spoke out in favor of the reconstruction of the Bauakademie under the motto "As much Schinkel as possible". The implementation competition for the building should "take into account Schinkel's specifications for the building, structure and facade". In January 2019, the Federal Bauakademie Foundation was founded as the supporting organization for the reconstruction of the building. In November 2019, the SPD politician Florian Pronold as the founding director and in January 2020 the cultural manager Julia Rust von Krosigk was elected as the vice director of the Bundesstiftung Bauakademie. Pronold's election provoked criticism in parts of the architecture community, which the Federal Ministry of the Interior, the Building Academy and Pronold himself rejected. Two competitors filed a lawsuit against the recruitment process. On 7 January, the labor court in Berlin issued an injunction in the proceedings of the plaintiff Philipp Oswalt, which prohibited the foundation from filling the director's position with Pronold, as the proceedings did not meet the requirements of the best selection that apply to public office. On 10 March 2020, Pronold announced that it would not take up the position as director On 12 June, the regional labor court confirmed the temporary injunction as a second instance on the grounds that the Federal Bauakademie Foundation is "designed according to the rules of the statutes in the sense of continued state control. The Federal Republic of Germany as the founder, represented by the Federal Government, represented by the Federal Ministries, has a continuing significant influence in the sense of a possible implementation of essential decisions. There is a financial and personal dependency, 'ruling through' in the above sense is possible." On 9 September 2020, the Federal Ministry of the Interior for Building and Home Affairs announced that the director's position would be re-advertised, based on the judgment of the Berlin-Brandenburg State Labor Court.
