= Alte Kommandantur =

Coordinates: 52°31′02″N 13°23′52″E

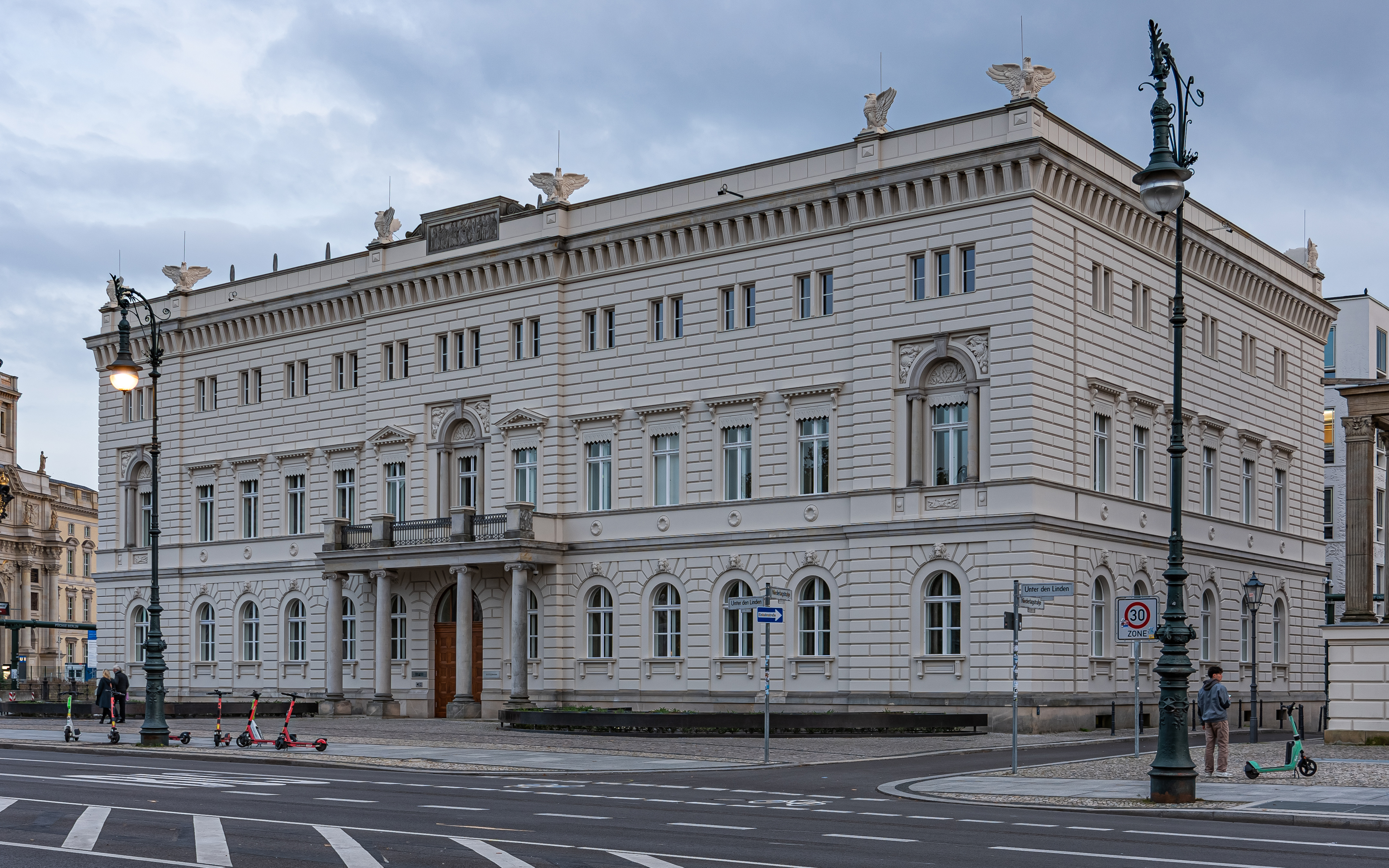
Kommandantenhaus

The Kommandantenhaus (Commandant's House), also called Alte Kommandantur (Old Commandantura), on Unter den Linden boulevard in the historic centre of Berlin is the former headquarter of the city's commandant. It was built in 1654 and renovated from 1873 to 1874 in Renaissance Revival style. Damaged during the Allied bombing in World War II and later demolished, it was rebuilt from 2001 to 2003 as part of the Forum Fridericianum. Since then, it has been home to a representative office of Bertelsmann. The Kommandantenhaus was the workplace of the French writer Stendhal, the German politician Otto Wels and the German Resistance member Paul von Hase.

== History ==
The Alte Kommandantur is a building in the historic center of Berlin, which had been heavily damaged during World War II and destroyed in order to make room for the Ministry for Foreign Affairs of East Germany.

The original building was in the baroque style, built by architect Johann Gregor Memhardt (b. 1607, d. 1678), and enlarged in 1795, and modified again in 1873 in a neo-Renaissance style.

In 1995, the Ministry for Foreign Affairs of East Germany itself was demolished in order to recreate the Werderscher Markt area.

The Alte Kommandantur was rebuilt by media conglomerate Bertelsmann and the Bertelsmann Stiftung foundation to become its joint Berlin liaison office with the prestigious address Unter den Linden 1. Since no plan was available, the building was designed based on historic pre-war photographs and testimonies. The building was completed in November 2003.

== See also ==
- Bauakademie
