= Berlin Brandenburger Tor station =

Underground railway station in Germany

Coordinates: 52°30′59″N 13°22′51″E

Brandenburger Tor
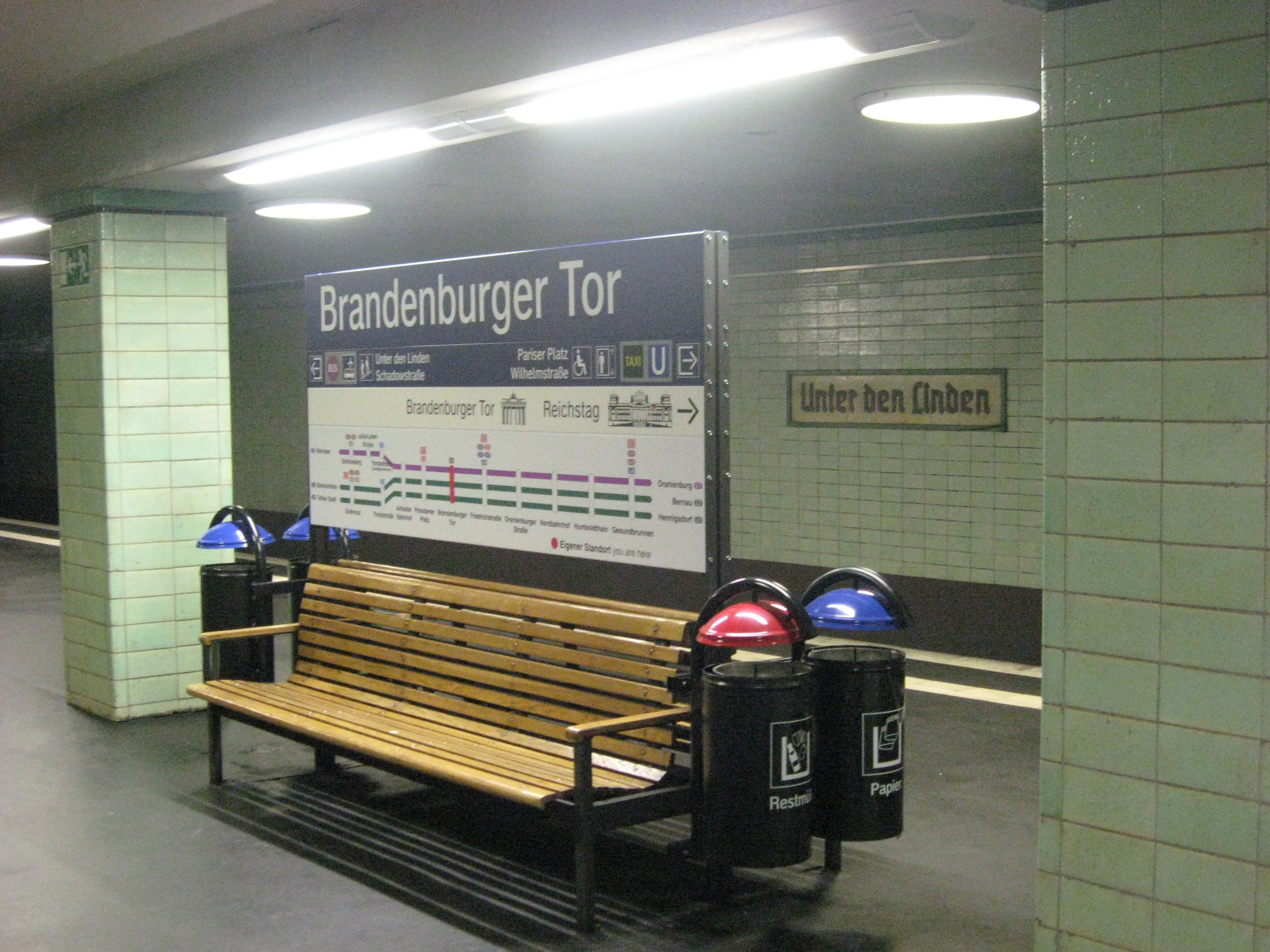
- Seats and sign with the station's current name (Brandenburger Tor) on the station's S-Bahn platforms. The station's old name (Unter den Linden) can be seen on the station's wall.

General information
- Location: Mitte, Berlin; Germany
- Platforms: 2 S-bahn: 1 island platform U-bahn: 1 island platform
- Tracks: 4

Construction
- Structure type: Underground

Other information
- Station code: 6340
- DS100 code: BUDL
- Category: 4
- Fare zone: VBB: Berlin A/5555

History
- Opened: 27 July 1936 (First opening); 2 December 1946 (Second opening); 1 September 1990 (Third opening)
- Closed: 21 April 1945 (First closing); 13 August 1961 (Second closing)
- Former names: Berlin Unter den Linden

Services
Preceding station	Berlin S-Bahn	Following station
Friedrichstraße towards Oranienburg	S1	Potsdamer Platz towards Wannsee
Friedrichstraße towards Bernau	S2	Potsdamer Platz towards Blankenfelde
Friedrichstraße towards Hennigsdorf	S25	Potsdamer Platz towards Teltow Stadt
Friedrichstraße towards Blankenburg	S26	Potsdamer Platz towards Teltow Stadt
Preceding station	Berlin U-Bahn	Following station
Bundestag towards Berlin Hbf	U5	Unter den Linden towards Hönow
Location

Berlin Brandenburger Tor station (German: Bahnhof Berlin Brandenburger Tor) is an underground railway station in the central Mitte district of Berlin, Germany, located on the Unter den Linden boulevard near Hotel Adlon, Pariser Platz and Brandenburg Gate. It is served by the Berlin S-Bahn and U-Bahn, as well as local bus lines. The station was known as Berlin Unter den Linden from 1936–2009.

== Overview ==
Historical station sign of 1936

The station opened on 27 July 1936 in the course of the building of the Nord-Süd Bahn tunnel. Train service discontinued on 21 April 1945 and could not be resumed until 2 December 1946 as the tunnel was flooded. The station was again closed with the construction of the Berlin Wall on 13 August 1961 and for decades became one of Berlin's ghost stations, as while both terminals of the Nord-Süd railway line were located in West Berlin, the station itself was located in the East. Unter den Linden later reopened on 1 September 1990, one month before the German reunification.

On completion of the new U55 line of the Berlin U-Bahn from Berlin Hauptbahnhof, the U-bahn station started operations as its temporary southern terminus and as an interchange with the Nord Süd S-Bahn lines. Both the U-Bahn and the S-Bahn station were renamed Brandenburger Tor in 2009 to distinguish them from Unter den Linden U-Bahn station at the junction of Unter den Linden with the Friedrichstraße. The U5 line through the station to the east opened on 4 December 2020.

== Gallery ==
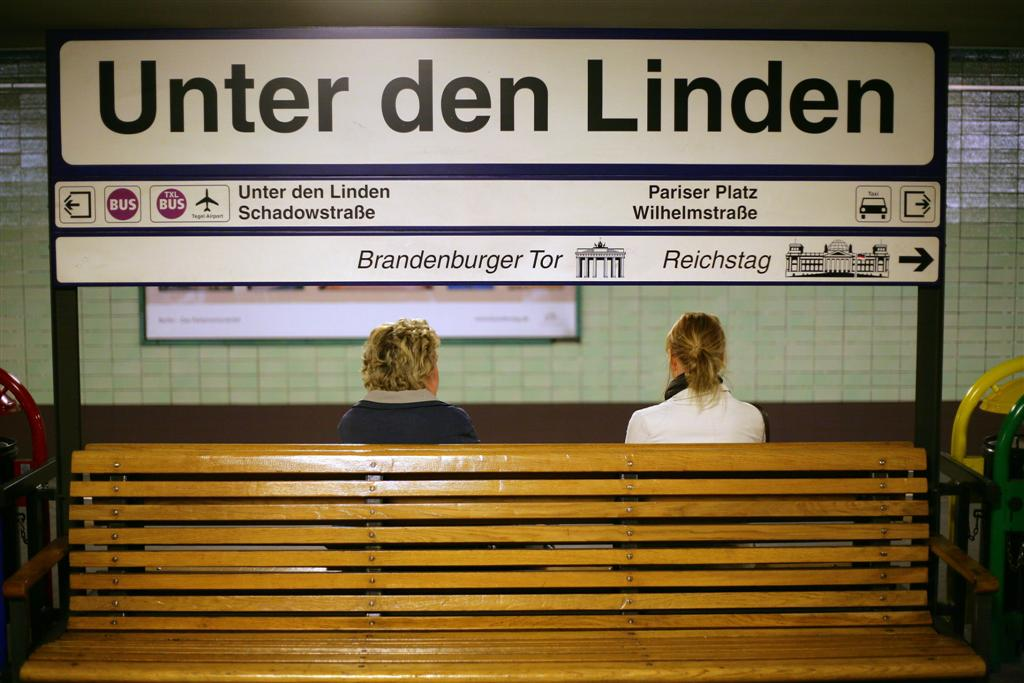
Unter den Linden station sign in 2007

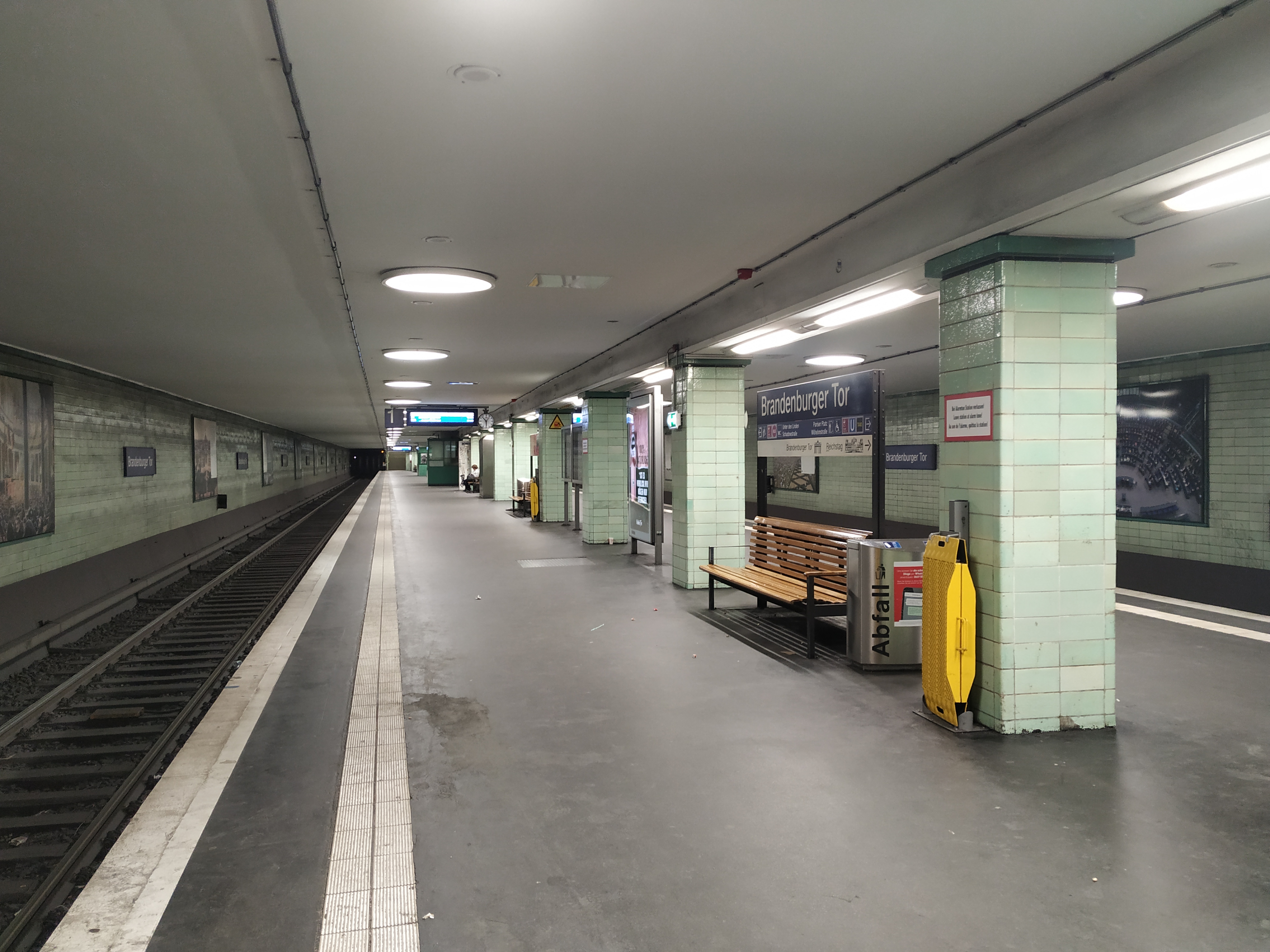
View of the S-Bahn station

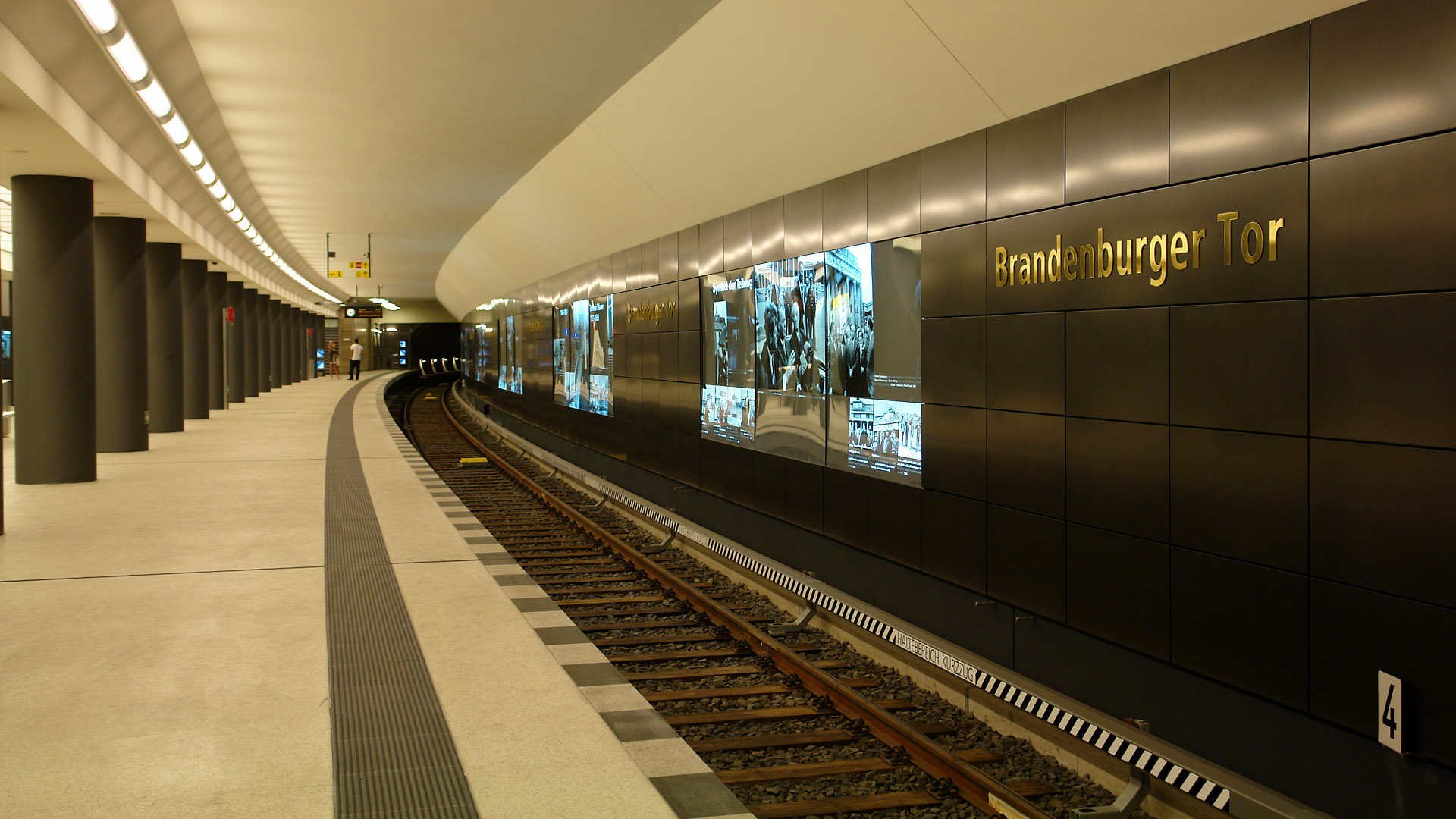
Platform of the U-Bahn station (U5)

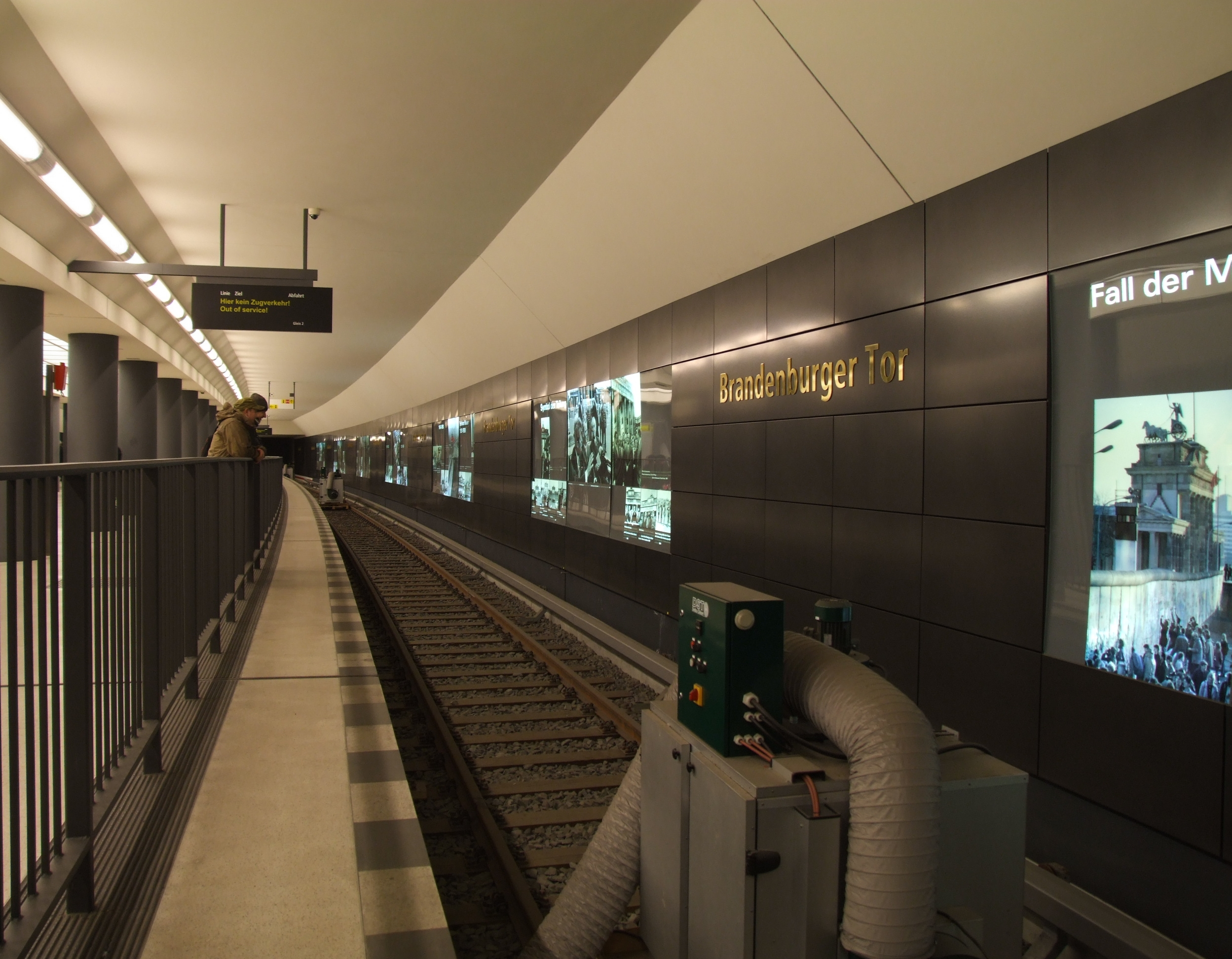
U-Bahn station - empty track to Alexanderplatz (December 2011)

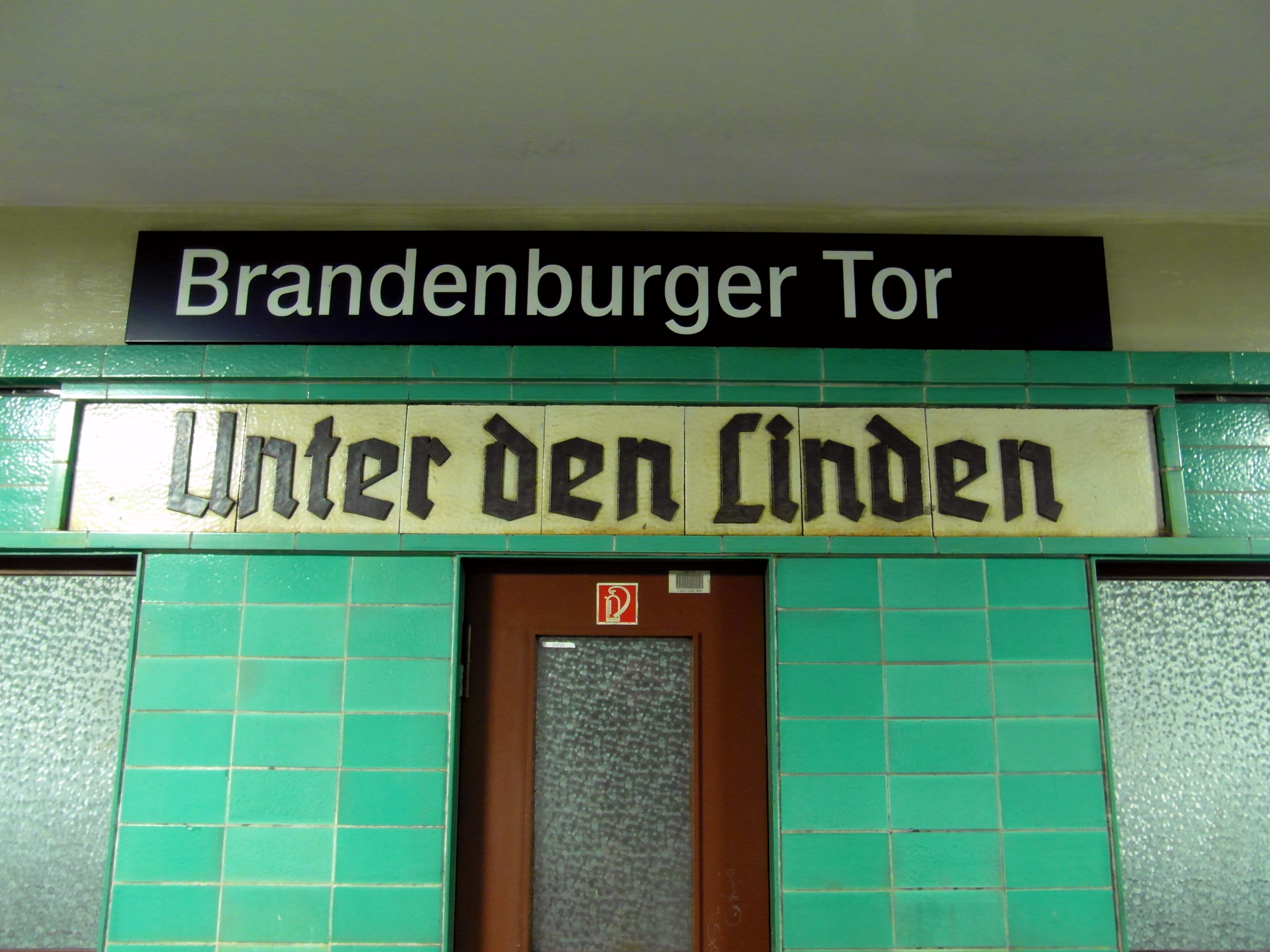
Signboards with new and old station names (S-Bahn)

== See also ==
- Unter den Linden U-bahn station
