= Straße des 17. Juni =

Thoroughfare in Berlin, Germany

- Strasse des 17. Juni
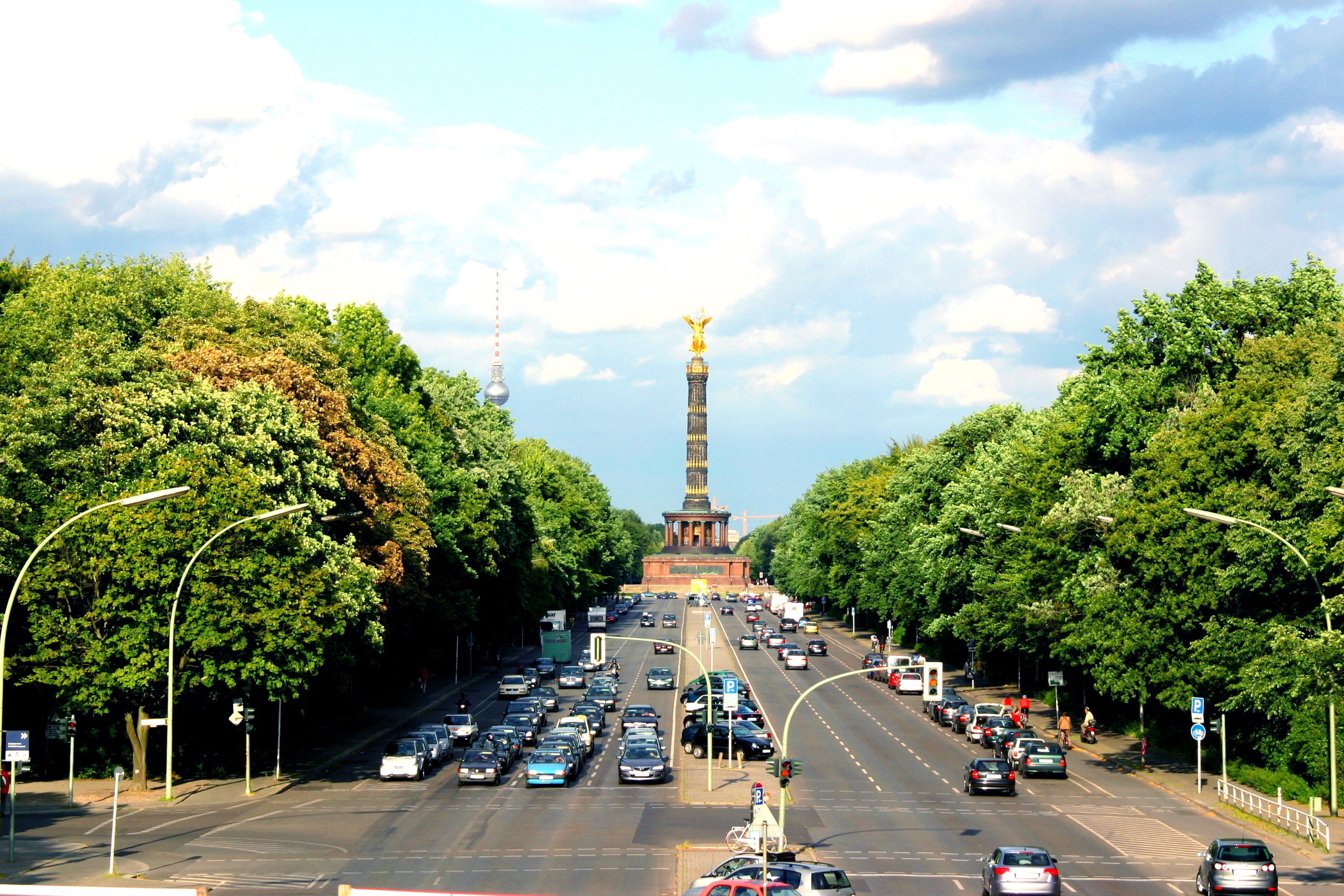
- Looking east along the Straße des 17. Juni from the Tiergarten S-Bahn station, with the Victory Column in the distance
- Interactive map of Straße des 17. Juni
- Former names: Charlottenburger Chaussee; (1705–1953)
- Part of: Bundesstraße 2; Bundesstraße 5
- Namesake: East German uprising of 1953
- Type: Boulevard
- Location: Berlin, Germany
- Quarter: Tiergarten, Charlottenburg
- Nearest metro station: Brandenburger Tor; Tiergarten; Ernst-Reuter-Platz
- Coordinates: 52°30′52″N 13°20′55″E
- East end: Unter den Linden; Pariser Platz; Brandenburg Gate; Platz des 18. März; Ebertstraße
- Major junctions: Yitzhak-Rabin-Straße; Großer Stern; Spreeweg; Altonaer Straße; Helmut-Kohl-Allee; Klopstockstraße; Bachstraße; Salzufer; Einsteinufer; Müller-Breslau-Straße
- West end: Ernst-Reuter-Platz; Marchstraße; Otto-Suhr-Allee; Hardenbergstraße; Bismarckstraße

Construction
- Inauguration: 1697

The Straße des 17. Juni, or Strasse des 17. Juni (see ß; German pronunciation: [ˈʃtʁaːsə dɛs ˈziːpˌt͡seːntn̩ ˈjuːni]; transl. 17th of June Street), is a street in central Berlin, the capital of Germany. Its name refers to the 17 June 1953 uprising in East Germany. The western continuation of the boulevard Unter den Linden, it runs east–west through the Tiergarten, a large park to the west of the city centre. At the eastern end of the street is the Brandenburg Gate and the Platz des 18. März, it then passes the Soviet War Memorial before passing either side of the Victory Column (Siegessäule) in the middle of the park, and out of the park through the Charlottenburg Gate, terminating about 500 metres (1,600 ft) later at Ernst-Reuter-Platz. The street is a section of the main western thoroughfare radiating out from the centre of Berlin so the road continues to the west of Ernst-Reuter-Platz, the first section of which is called Bismarckstraße.

== History ==
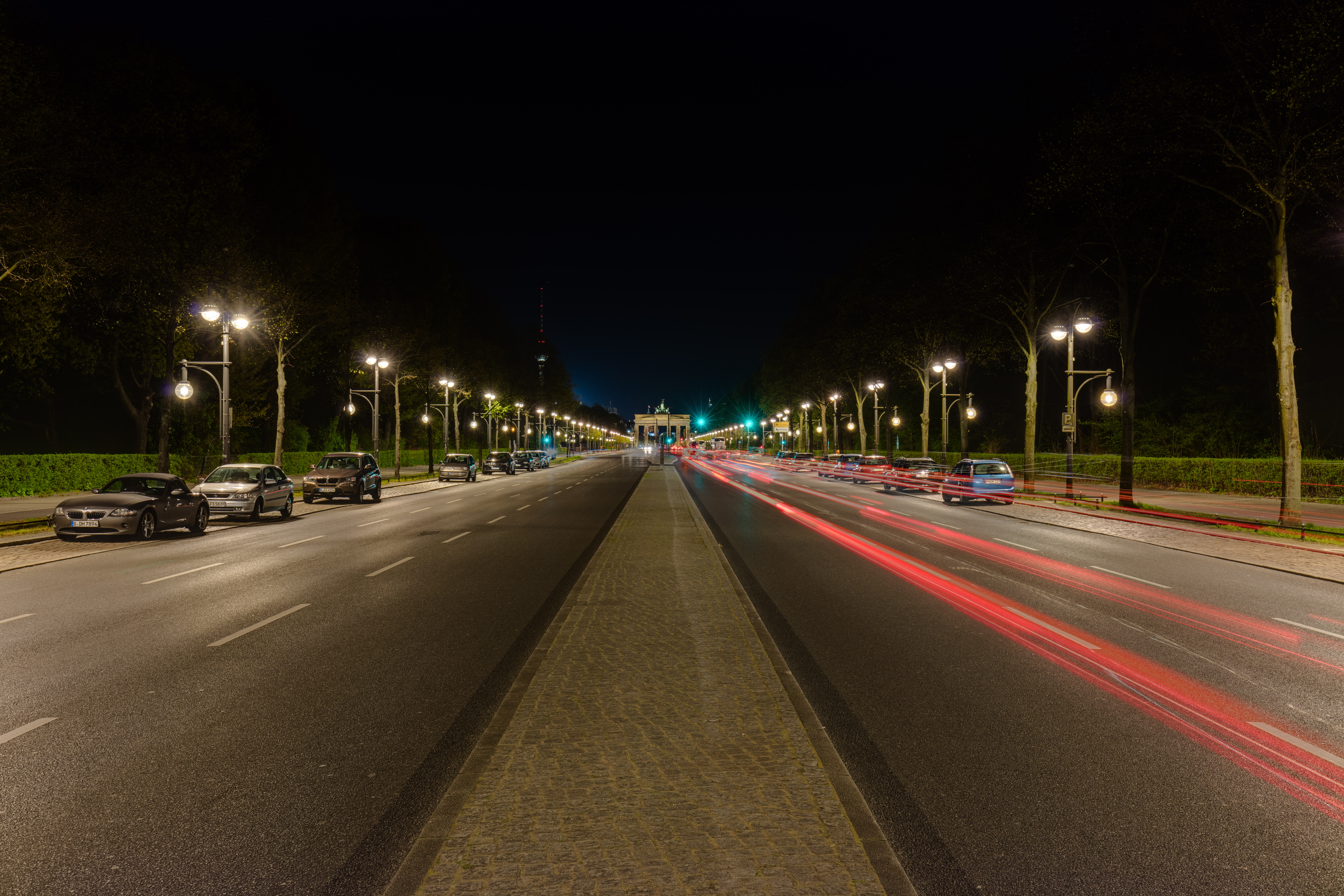
View by night with the Brandenburger Tor in the background

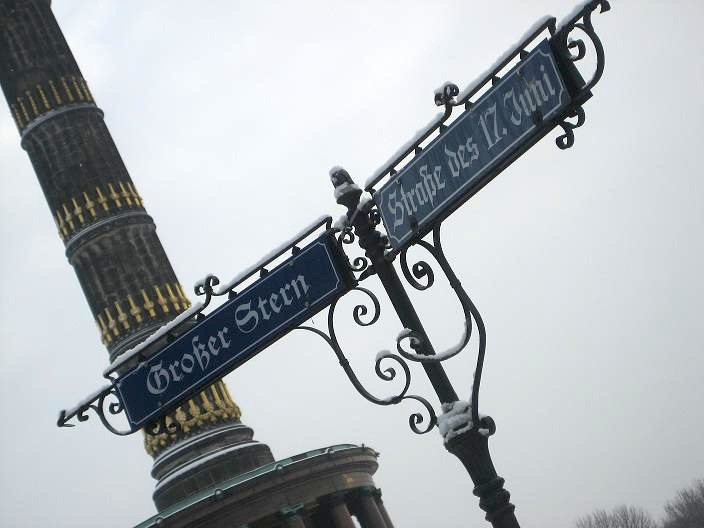
Street sign with Victory Column in the background

Before 1953, the street was called Charlottenburger Chaussee, because it ran from the old city center (Berlin-Mitte) to the borough of Charlottenburg through the Tiergarten (Zoo; literally "animal garden"). The 1953 name change was made in order to honor an East German uprising and its victims. Soon after Stalin's death many East Berliners began a strike against working conditions, centered on the building sites around today's Karl-Marx-Allee. This gained momentum and descended into rioting when faced with strong opposition from the East German authorities, largely on 17 June 1953. (Another street, in northwest Berlin, got the name Charlottenburger Chaussee instead.)

It was made into a paved road in 1799, and owing to Berlin's rapid growth in the 19th century it became a major thoroughfare to the affluent western suburbs. At the outbreak of World War I in early August 1914, hundreds of thousands of Berliners cheered the military parade, which took place here. At the outbreak of World War II, no such scenes were ever observed, according to the American journalist and historian William L. Shirer.

Charlottenburger Chausee was a part of the Ost-West-Achse (East-West Axis), which during the Nazi period became a triumphal avenue lined with Nazi flags. During the Nazi era, the boulevard was made broader and the Prussian-era Victory Column was moved from in front of the Reichstag to the roundabout in the middle of the Tiergarten, where it has remained since 1938.

The Charlottenburger Chaussee was to have formed one aspect of the remodelling of the city of Berlin into the renamed city called Germania, designed by Hitler, Albert Speer, and Paul Troost to be the capital of the Reich.

In the last weeks of World War II, when Berlin's airports were unusable, it was used as a landing strip.

In 1953, West Berlin renamed the street Straße des 17. Juni, to commemorate the People's uprising in East Berlin on 17 June 1953, when the Red Army and GDR Volkspolizei shot protesting workers.

The street has in recent years been used for mega-events such as the Love Parade or Live 8. In 2006, the street was closed to vehicular traffic for six weeks for use as the Fanmeile (fan mile) during the 2006 Football World Cup. It also serves as the starting point for the Berlin Marathon. Every New Year's Eve, the street is also one of the gathering points in Berlin where usually over a million people gather to watch a stage show at the Brandenburg Gate, party and see fireworks go off at midnight. It is the largest such party in Europe, if not the world.
