= List of streets named after Hermann Göring =

Hermann Göring (1893–1946) was a German politician and aviator and one of the most powerful figures in the Nazi Party, He served as the Supreme Commander of the Luftwaffe (the German Air Force).

A number of streets in Germany, Poland, and Austria were named for him, including:

== Hermann-Göring-Straßen ==
- Berlin: Ebertstraße
- Düsseldorf: Benrather Straße
- Gladbeck: Horster Straße
- Kalisz: Al. Wolności
- München: Liebensteinstraße
- Nörvenich: Bahnhofstraße, Marktplatz, Burgstraße, Am Kreuzberg
- Swinemünde: Lindenstrasse, heute ul. Armii Krajowej
- Gerasdorf bei Wien: unknown

== Hermann-Göring-Plätze ==
- Karlsruhe: Gottesauer Platz
- Wien: Rooseveltplatz

== Others ==
- Berge, Forst (Lausitz): Hermann-Göring-Damm, now Zasieki, destroyed
- Breslau: Hermann Goering Sportfeld, Olympiastadion Breslau, now Stadion Olimpijski and camping
- Düren: originally Lendersdorfer Weg, later Hermann-Göring-Damm, after the war Dr.-Overhues-Allee
- Trier: Hermann-Göring-Stadion, Moselstadion
- Neuwied and Weißenthurm, Hermann-Göring-Brücke. Raiffeisenbrücke
- Lebenstedt, Salzgitter: Hermann-Göring-Stadt
