= Platz des 18. März =

Square in Berlin, Germany

- The square in March 2014
- Interactive map of Platz des 18. März
- Former names: Platz vor dem Brandenburger Tor; (18th century–1934); Hindenburgplatz; (1934–1958); Platz vor dem Brandenburger Tor; (1958–2000)
- Namesake: 18 March 1848 and; 18 March 1990
- Type: Public square
- Location: Berlin, Germany
- Quarter: Mitte
- Nearest metro station: Brandenburger Tor
- Coordinates: 52°30′59″N 13°22′38″E
- West end: Straße des 17. Juni; Ebertstraße
- East end: Brandenburg Gate; Pariser Platz; Unter den Linden

The Platz des 18. März (German: [ˈplats dɛs ˈaxˌtseːntn̩ ˈmɛʁts]; transl. "18 of March Square") is a public square in Berlin-Mitte located immediately west of the Brandenburg Gate, opposite Pariser Platz, at the junction of Ebertstraße and Straße des 17. Juni.

== History ==
During the Cold War, the border between East and West Berlin ran straight through the square. The eastern and western parts of the square were separated by a semicircular arch of the Berlin Wall from 1961 until its fall in 1989. Ronald Reagan's 1987 "Tear down this wall!" speech was held at the square in front of the Brandenburg Gate, and a memorial plaque was placed there in his honour 25 years later.

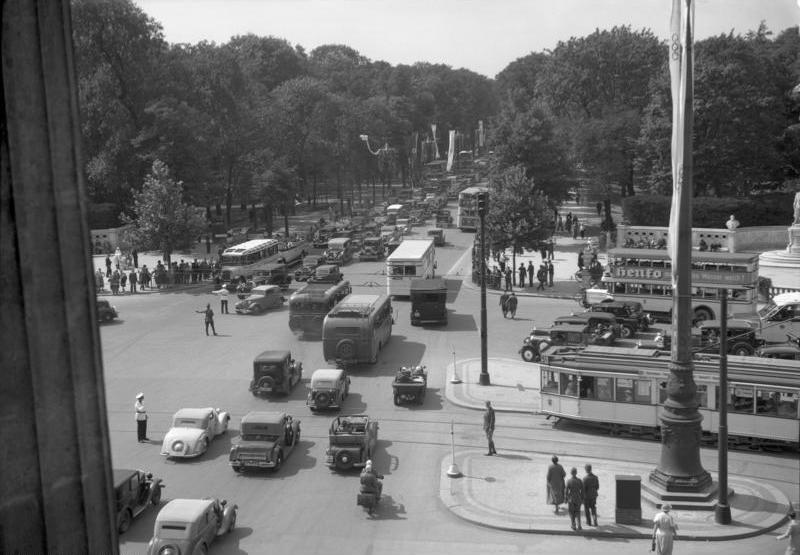
During the 1936 Summer Olympics

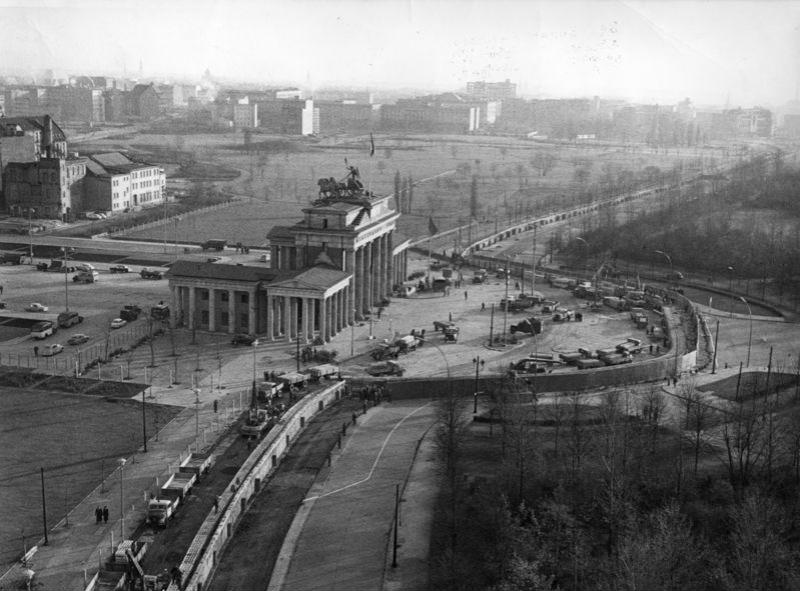
Construction of the Berlin Wall on the square, 1961

Divided Berlin in June 1981

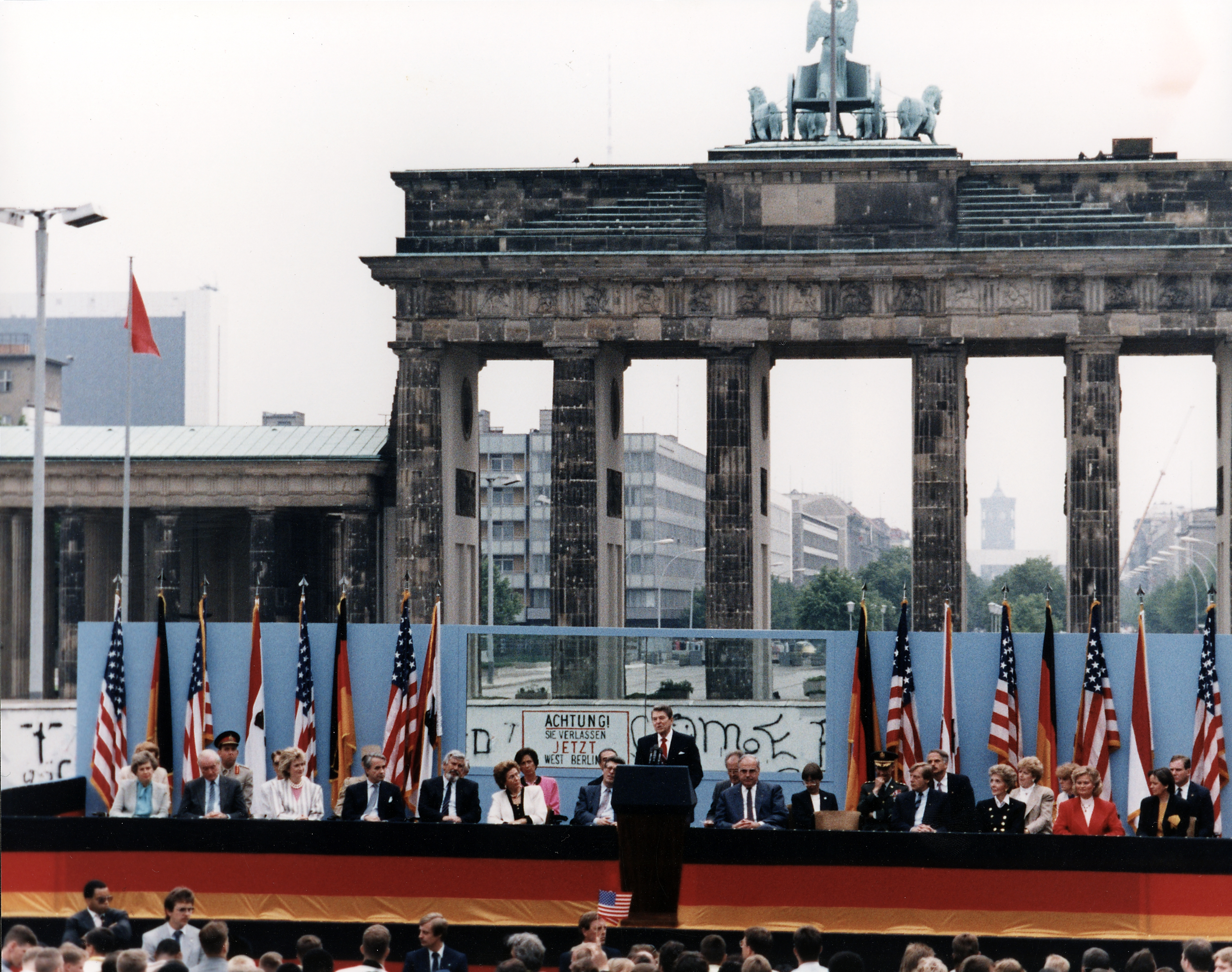
Ronald Reagan visiting in June 1987, while delivering his Tear down this wall! speech.

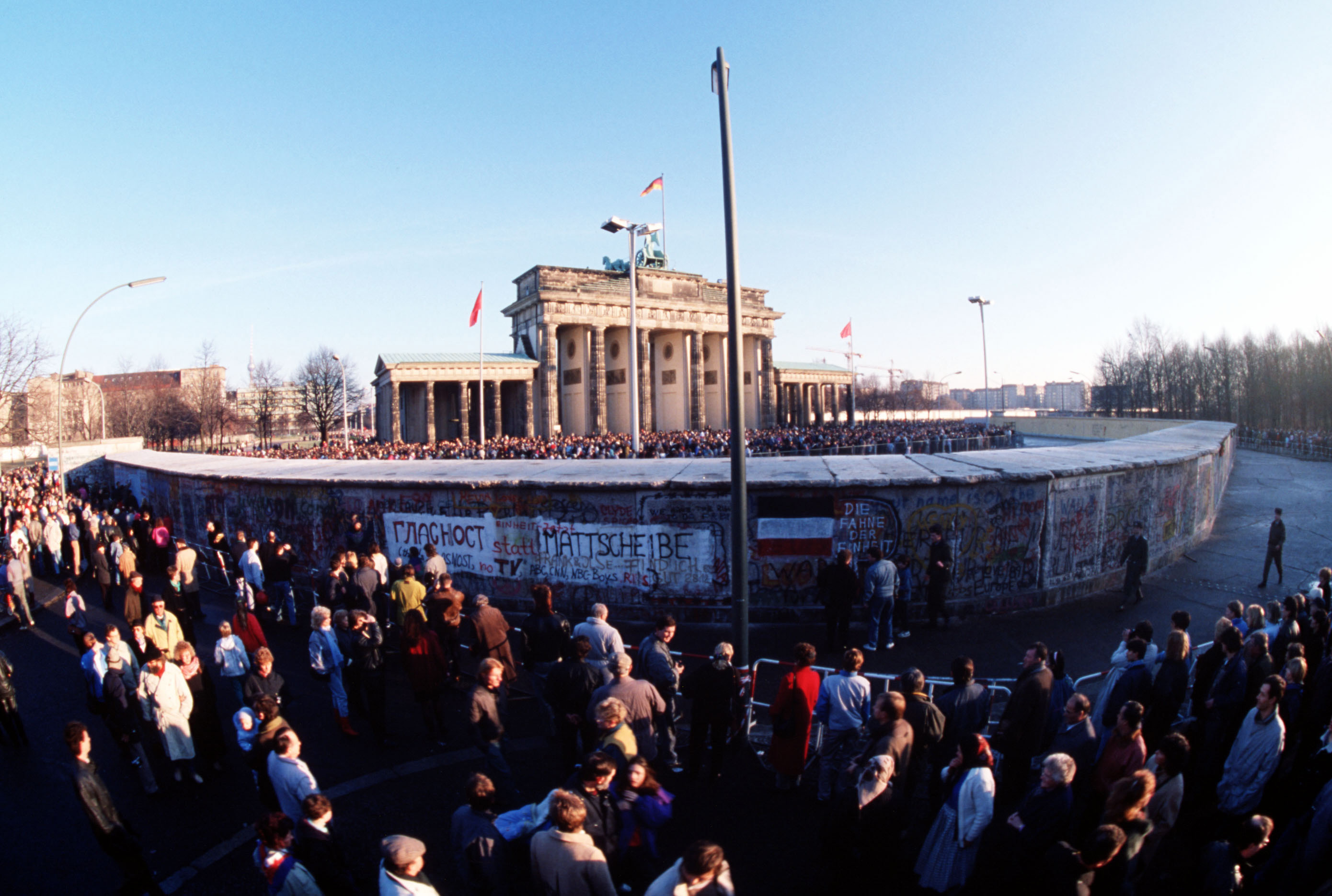
Shortly before the wall is torn down, December 1989

== Name ==
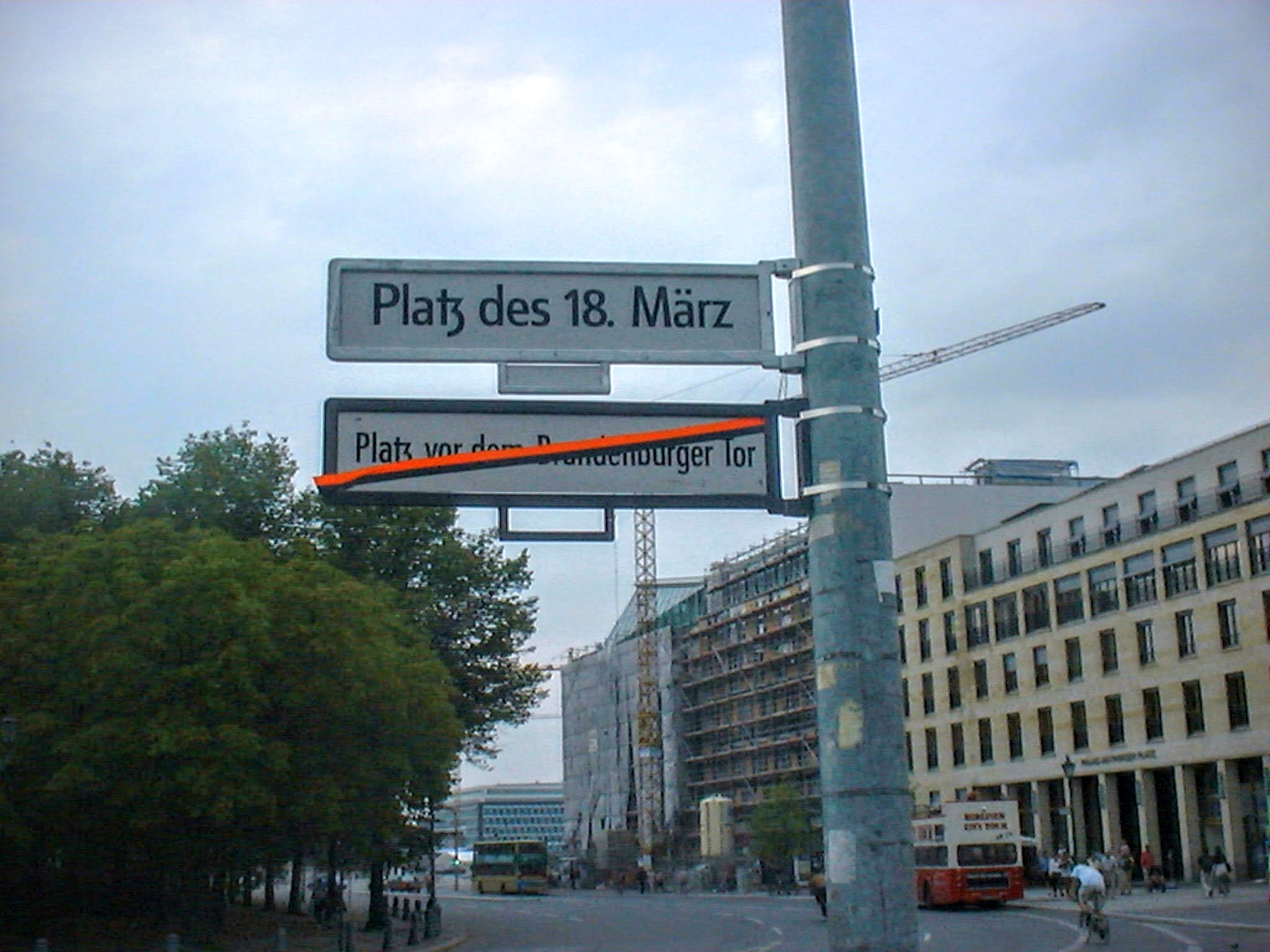
Street sign in August 2000 featuring the old and new names

The square was formerly named Platz vor dem Brandenburger Tor from the eighteenth century. In 1934 it was renamed Hindenburgplatz after Paul von Hindenburg, then the recently deceased President of Germany, but the change was reverted in 1958. It was changed to the present name on 15 June 2000 after long discussions between the Senate and boroughs of Berlin.

18 March was a significant date twice in German history: In the course of the German revolutions of 1848–1849, the Prussian Army attacked revolutionaries in Berlin on 18 March 1848. The only democratic elections of East Germany were held on 18 March 1990.
