= Brandenburg Gate =

Triumphal arch and gate in Berlin, Germany

- Brandenburger Tor (German)
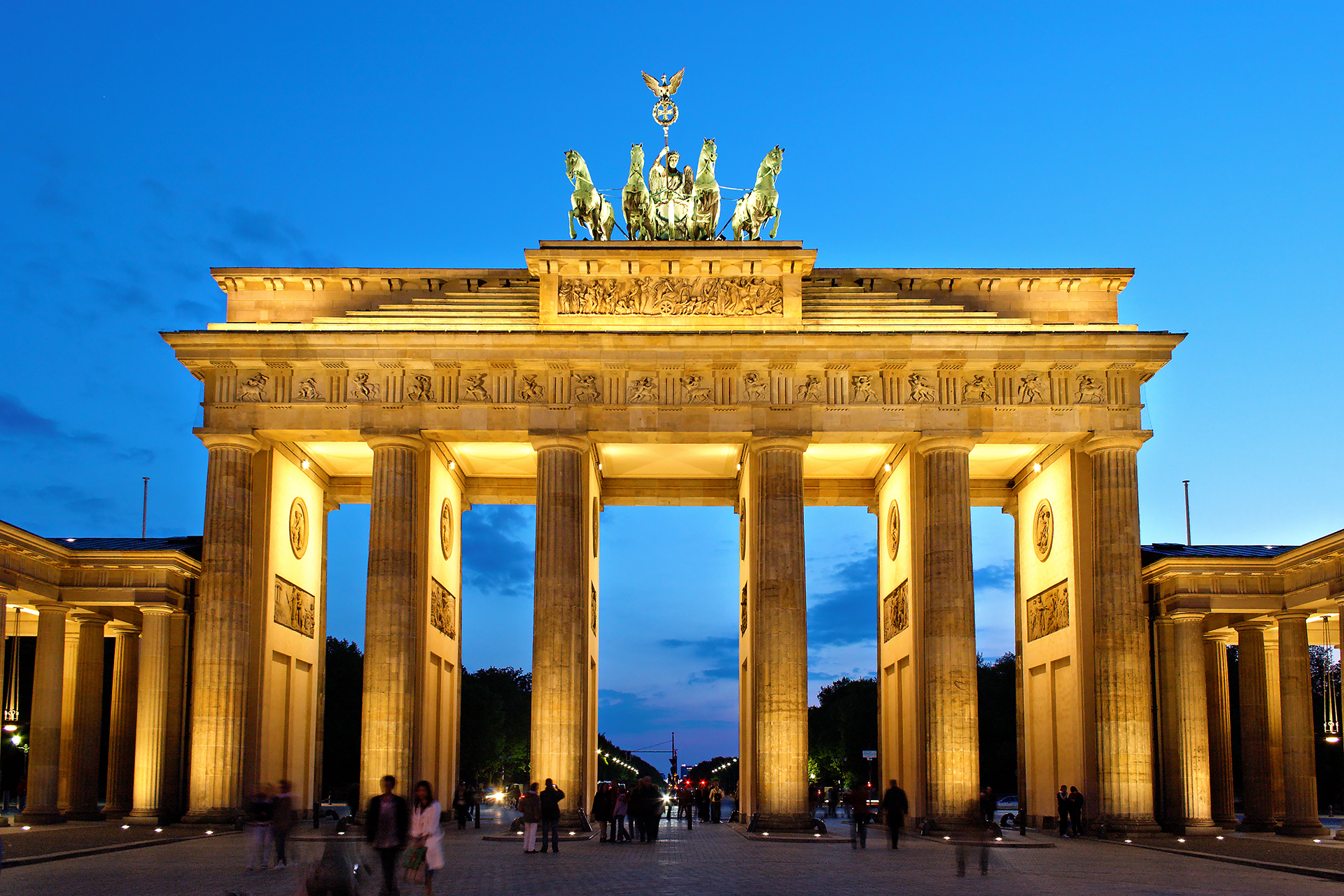
- View from Pariser Platz on the east side, 2008

General information
- Type: City gate
- Architectural style: Neoclassical
- Location: Berlin, Germany
- Coordinates: 52°30′59″N 13°22′40″E
- Construction started: 1788
- Completed: 1791

Height
- Height: 26 m (85 ft)

Dimensions
- Other dimensions: Width: 62.5 m (205 ft)

Design and construction
- Architect: Carl Gotthard Langhans

The Brandenburg Gate (German: Brandenburger Tor [ˈbʁandn̩ˌbʊʁɡɐ ˈtoːɐ̯]) is an 18th-century neoclassical monument in Berlin, Germany. One of the best-known landmarks of the country, it was erected on the site of a former city gate that marked the start of the road from Berlin to Brandenburg an der Havel, the former capital of the Margraviate of Brandenburg. The current structure was built from 1788 to 1791 by orders of King Frederick William II of Prussia, based on designs by the royal architect Carl Gotthard Langhans. The bronze sculpture of the quadriga crowning the gate is a work by the sculptor Johann Gottfried Schadow.

The Brandenburg Gate is located in the western part of the city centre within Mitte, at the junction of Unter den Linden and Ebertstraße. The gate dominates the Pariser Platz to the east, while to the immediate west it opens onto the Platz des 18. März beyond which the Straße des 17. Juni begins. One block to the north stands the Reichstag building, home to the German parliament (Bundestag), and further to the west is the Tiergarten inner-city park. The gate also forms the monumental entry to Unter den Linden, which leads directly to the former City Palace of the Prussian monarchs (now housing the Humboldt Forum museum), and Berlin Cathedral.

Throughout its existence, the Brandenburg Gate was often a site for major historical events. After World War II and during the Cold War, until its fall in 1989, the Berlin Wall obstructed the gateway, and was for almost three decades a marker of the city's division. Since German reunification in 1990, it has been considered not only a symbol of the tumultuous histories of Germany and Europe, but also of European unity and peace.

== Description ==
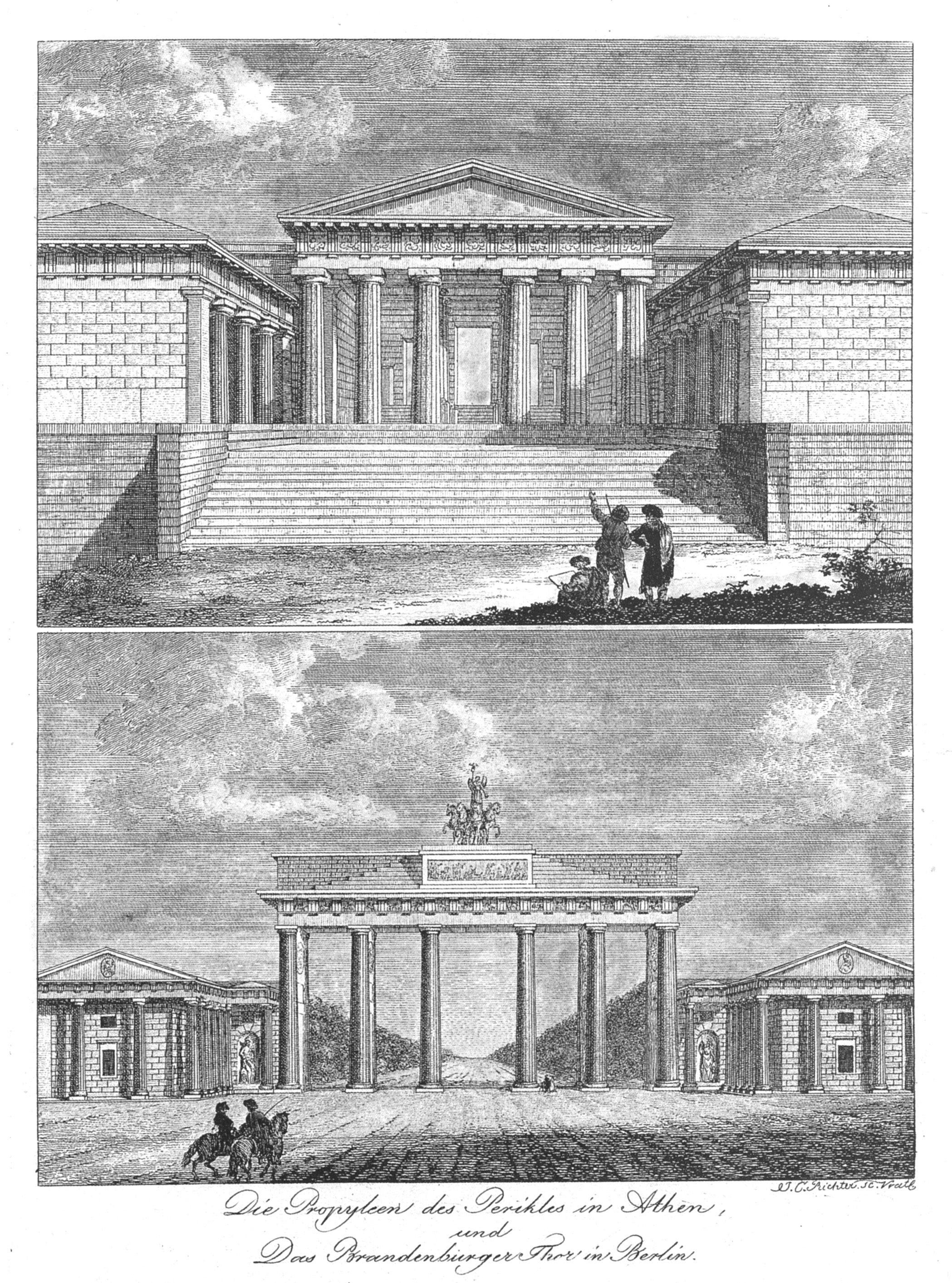
An early 19th-century engraving comparing the recently constructed Brandenburg Gate (lower picture) to (an imagined restoration of) its historical model: the Propylaea of the Acropolis of Athens

The central portion of the gate draws from the tradition of the Roman triumphal arch, although in style it is one of the first examples of Greek Revival architecture in Germany. The gate is supported by twelve fluted Doric columns, six to each side, forming five passageways. There are also walls between the pairs of columns at front and back, decorated with classicizing reliefs of the Labours of Hercules. Citizens were originally allowed to use only the outermost two passageways on each side. Its design is based on the Propylaea, the gateway to the Acropolis of Athens, which also had a front with six Doric columns, though these were topped by a triangular pediment.

The central portion is flanked by L-shaped wings on either side, at a lower height, but using the same Doric order. Next to, and parallel with, the gate these are open "stoas", but the longer sides, stretching beyond the east side, have buildings set back from the columns. These are called "custom houses" for the Berlin Customs Wall, which was in force until 1860, or "gatehouses".

The Doric order of the gate mostly, but not entirely, follows Greek precedents, which had recently become much better understood by the publication of careful illustrated records. The Greek Doric does not have bases to the columns, and the fluting here follows the Greek style for Ionic and Corinthian columns, with flat fillets rather than sharp arrises between the flutes, and rounded ends to the top and bottom of flutes. The entablature up to the cornice follows Greek precedent, with triglyphs, guttae, metopes, and mutules, except that there are half-metopes at the corners, the Roman rather than Greek solution to the "Doric corner conflict". The 16 metopes along each of the long faces have scenes from Greek mythology in relief; many echo the Parthenon in showing centaurs fighting men. Statues in niches at the furthest side wall of Minerva and Mars were added in the 19th century.

After an attic storey that is plain apart from wide steps at the sides receding in both directions, leading, on the east side only, to a large allegorical relief of the Triumph of Peace, the figures mostly women and children. Above this there is a second cornice, with a projecting central section. On top of this is a "bronze" sculptural group by Johann Gottfried Schadow of a quadriga—a chariot drawn by four horses—driven by a goddess figure. This was initially intended to represent Eirene, the Greek goddess of peace, but after the Napoleonic Wars was rebranded as Victoria, the Roman goddess of victory, and given an Iron Cross standard with a crowned Imperial eagle perched on top, rather than a wreath. This faces into the city centre. It is the first quadriga group to be made since antiquity, made from copper sheets hammered in moulds; fortunately these moulds were kept, as they would be used more than once to renew the sculpture.

The side wings have plain metopes, and simple angled roofs, ending in gable pediments with a small circular relief in the tympanum.

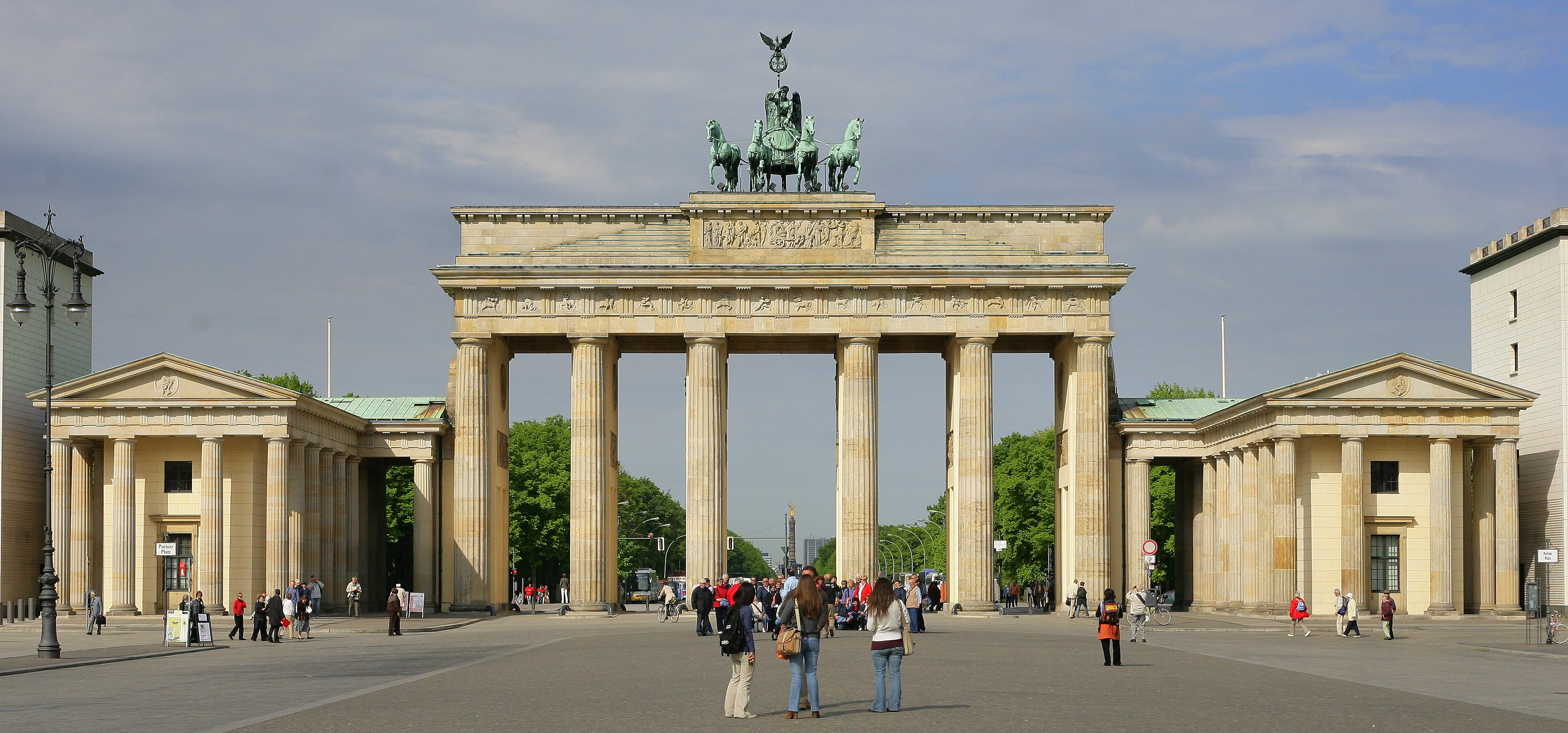
Frontal view with the Pariser Platz looking west towards Straße des 17. Juni

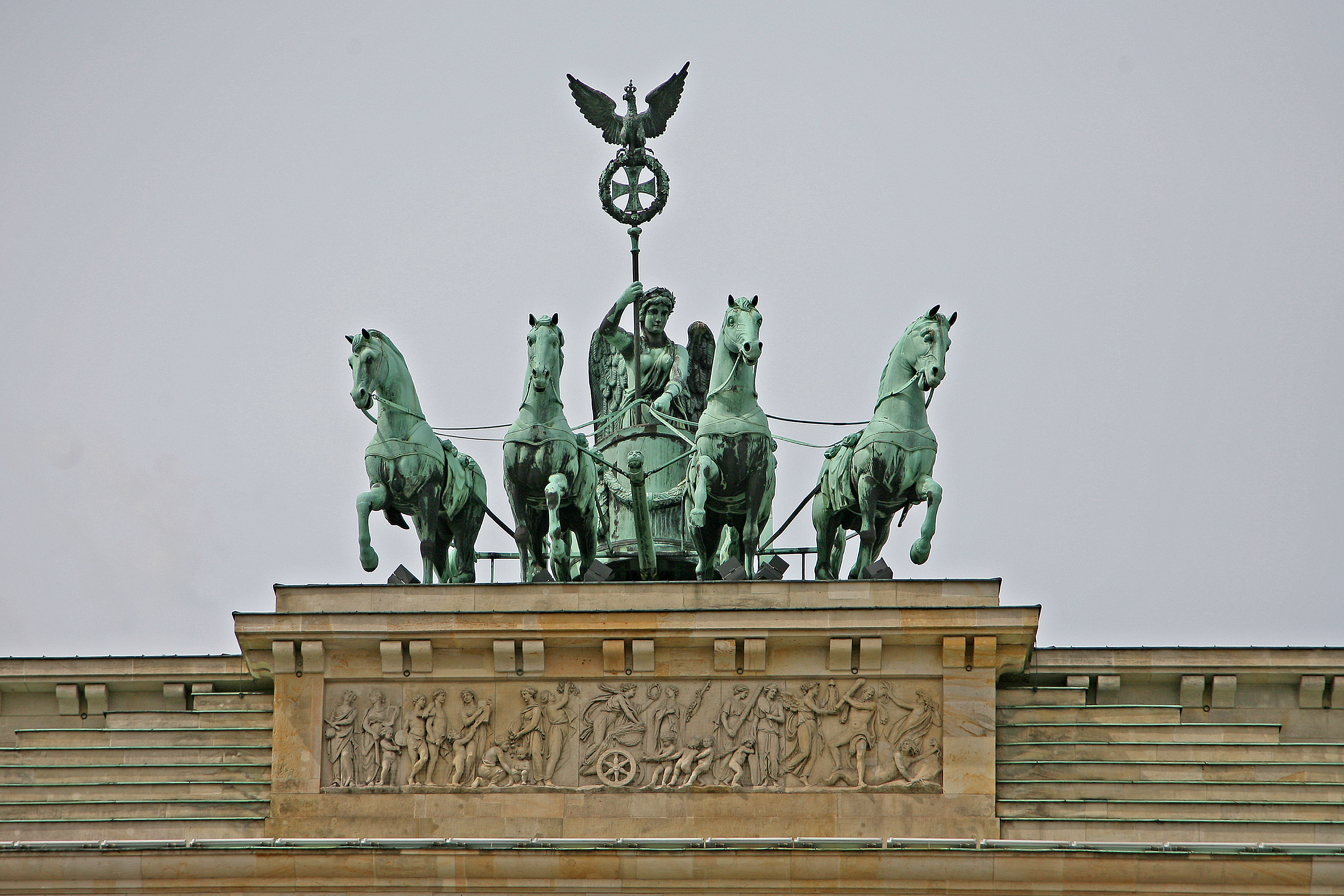
The quadriga and bas-reliefs

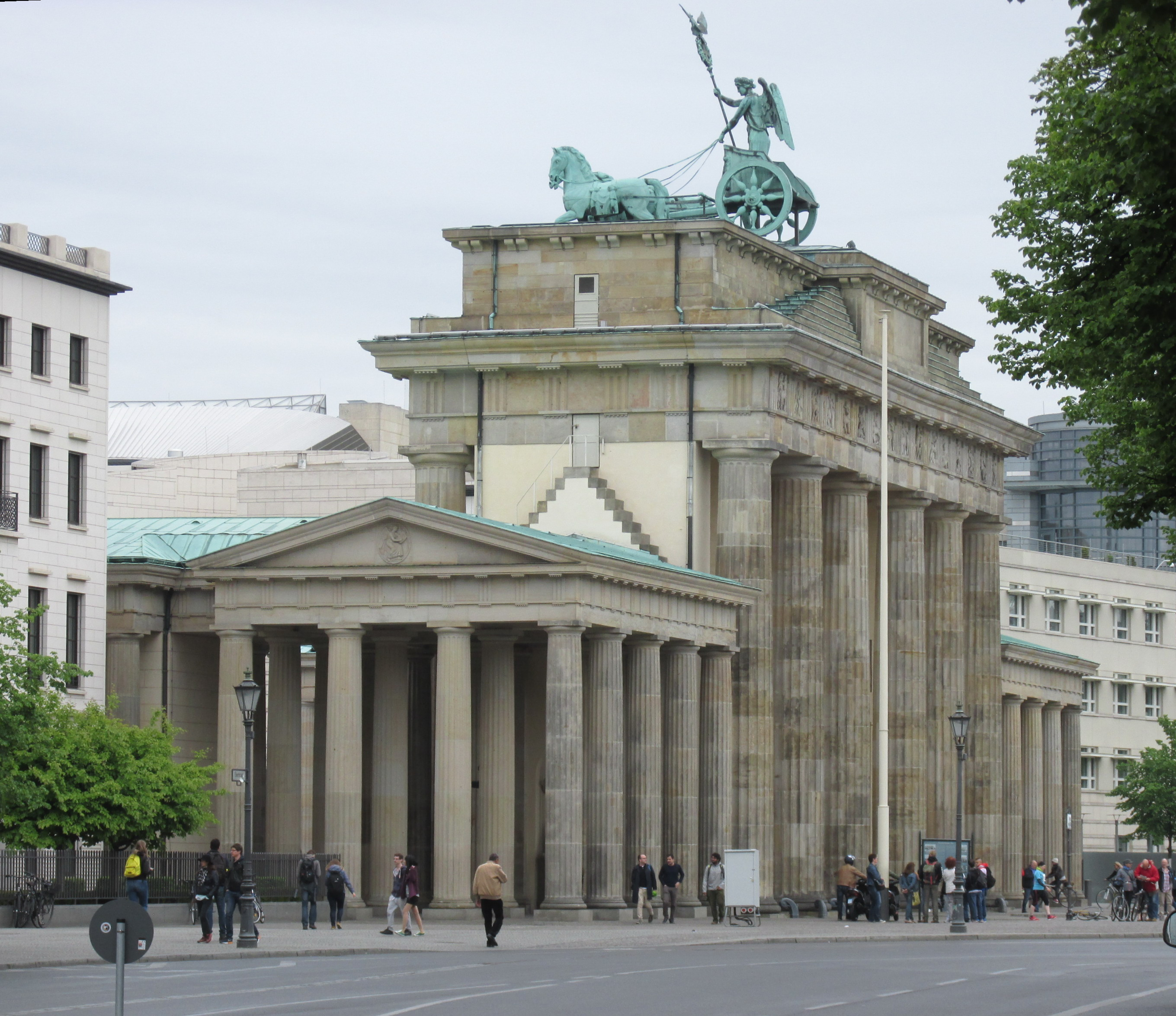
Side view, showing one of the stoas at the sides of the gate

== History ==
=== Previous gates ===
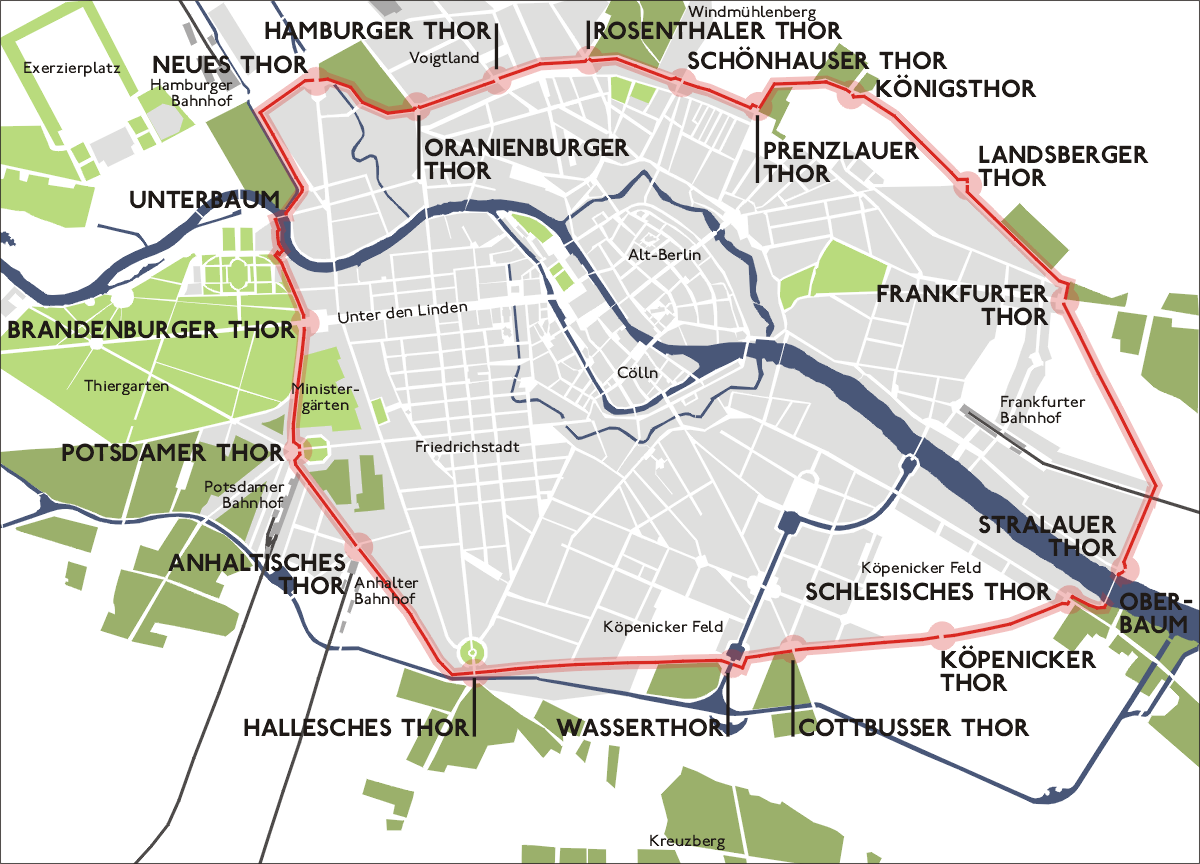
The Berlin Customs Wall with its eighteen gates, around 1855. The Brandenburger Thor (Brandenburg Gate) is on the left.

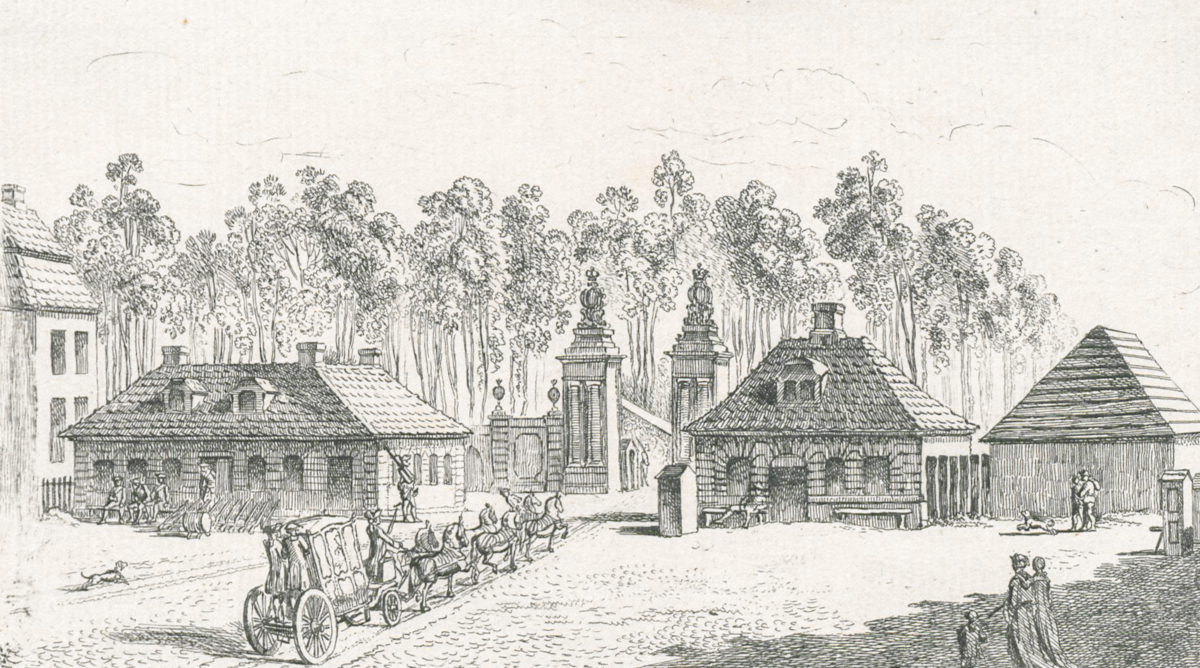
The old Brandenburg Gate in a 1764 engraving, 30 years before its neoclassical reconstruction

In the time of King Frederick William I (1688), shortly after the Thirty Years' War and a century before today's Brandenburg Gate was constructed, Berlin was a small walled city within a star fort with several named gates: Spandauer Tor, St. Georgen Tor, Stralower Tor, Cöpenicker Tor, Neues Tor, and Leipziger Tor (see map). Relative peace, a policy of religious tolerance, and status as capital of the Kingdom of Prussia facilitated the growth of the city. With the construction of Dorotheenstadt around 1670 and its inclusion in Berlin's city fortifications, a first gate was built on the site, approximately at the level of today's Schadowstraße, consisting of a breach through the raised wall and a drawbridge over the dug moat.

With the expansion of Dorotheenstadt to the west and the construction of the Berlin Customs Wall (German: Akzisemauer) in 1734, the latter of which enclosed the old fortified city and many of its then suburbs, a predecessor of today's Brandenburg Gate was built by the Court Architect Philipp Gerlach as a city gate on the road to Brandenburg an der Havel. The gate system consisted of two Baroque pylons decorated with pilasters and trophies, to which the gate wings were attached. In addition to the ornamental gate, there were simple passages for pedestrians in the wall, which were decorated with ornamental vases at this point.

=== 18th-century reconstruction ===
Frederick William II of Prussia was in his early forties when he came to the throne in 1786. He was determined to establish his capital of Berlin as a cultural centre. The military triumphs of his uncle Frederick the Great had made the Kingdom of Prussia a power that could not be ignored in European politics, but Berlin lacked the monuments and cultural life of Vienna, Paris or London. His uncle's tastes had been those typical of his generation, drawing on French classicism and English Palladianism, and his Brandenburg Gate in Potsdam (1770–71) was a much smaller monument, poised between Rococo and a Roman-influenced Neoclassical architecture.

Frederick William II summoned new German architects to Berlin, including Carl Gotthard Langhans from the city of Breslau (today Wrocław in Poland), who was appointed director of the "Oberhofbauamt" (Royal Office of Works) in 1788. Though he had designed many Neoclassical buildings, this was his first significant work in the Greek style, and his last major one; by 1792 he had designed a small neo-Gothic building for the New Garden in Potsdam. The gate was the first element of a "new Athens on the river Spree" by Langhans.

The gate was originally called "Friedenstor" (Peace Gate) and unceremoniously opened to traffic in August 1791 before its construction had been completed. It celebrated a Prussian military intervention in the Netherlands, supported by the British and the Dutch court. It had met with little resistance, restored the Dutch king (Frederick William's brother-in-law) to power, and resulted in a state treaty between Great Britain, Prussia, and the Netherlands.

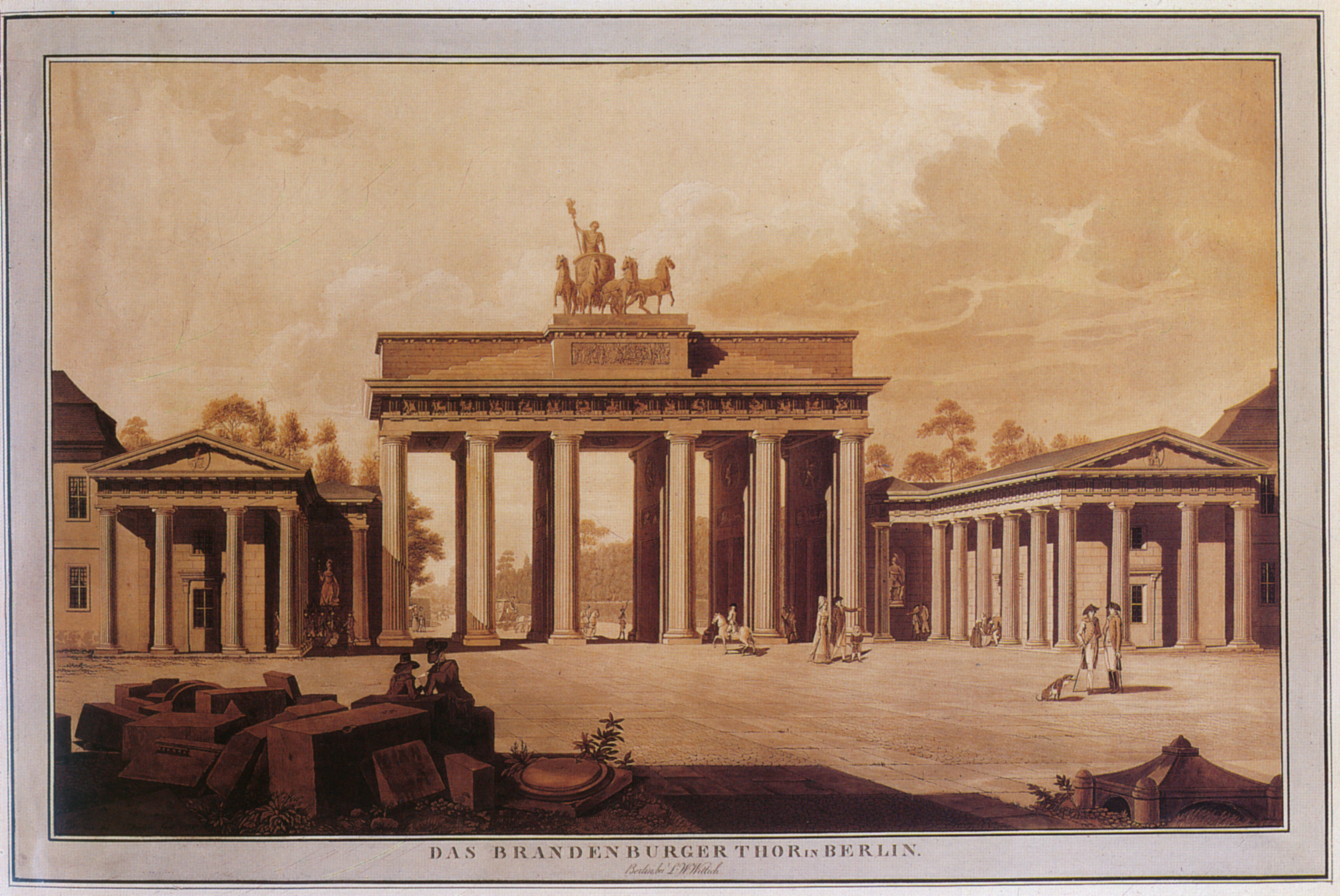
The new (current) Brandenburg Gate in 1796, following reconstruction

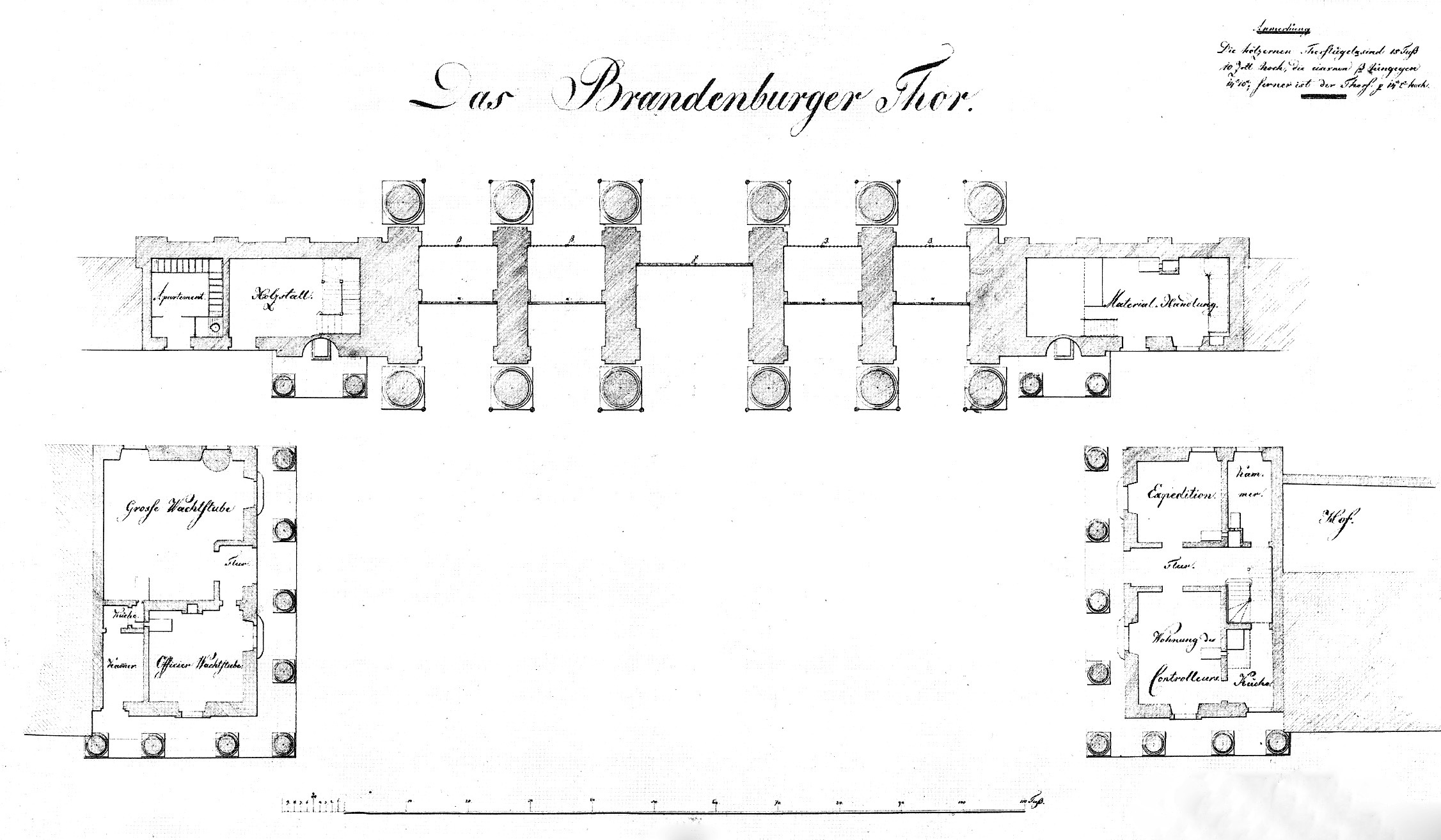
Floor plan of the Brandenburg Gate in its original (reconstructed) state

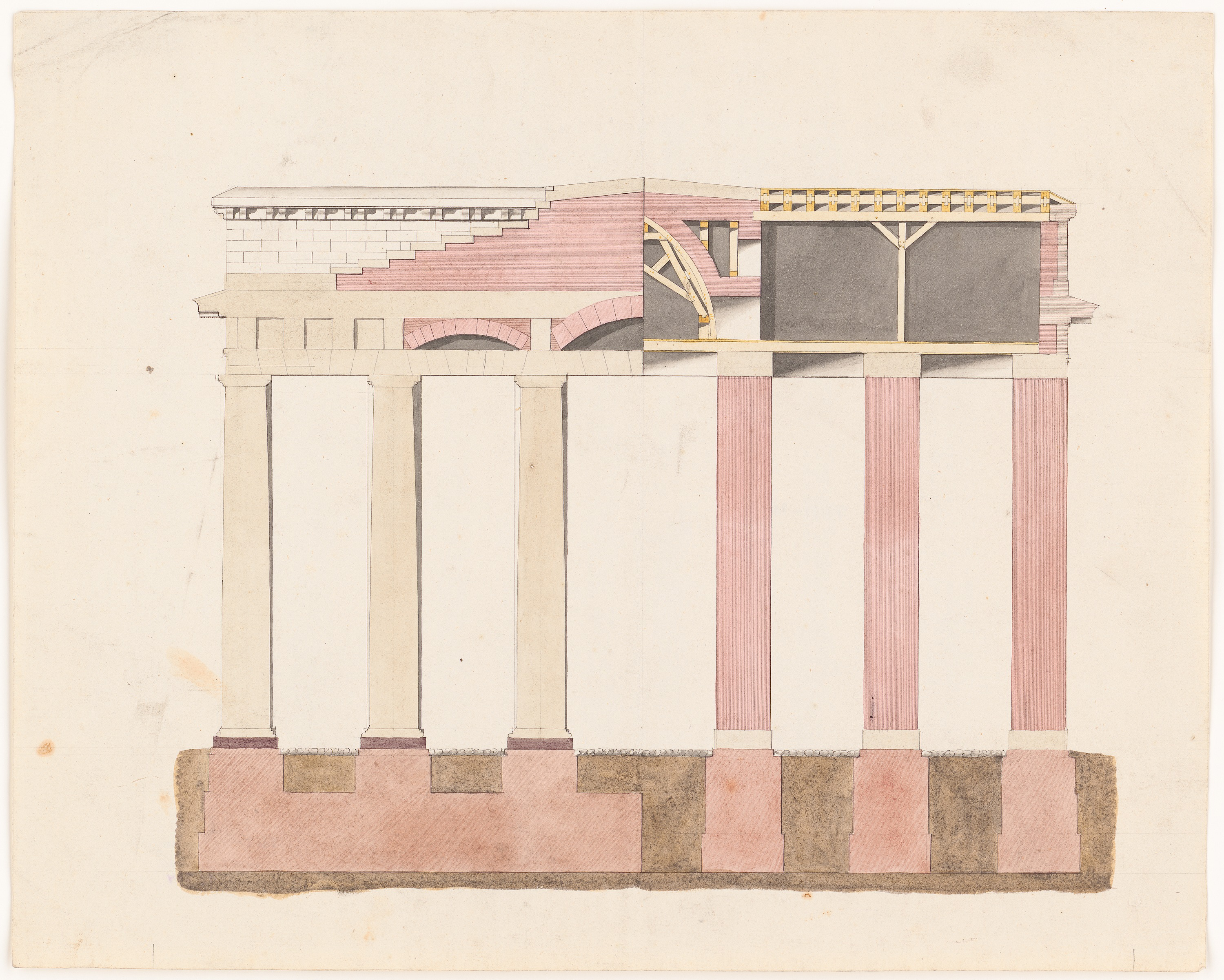
Synopsis of two cross sections of the gate, by Carl Gotthard Langhans

=== 19th and early 20th centuries ===
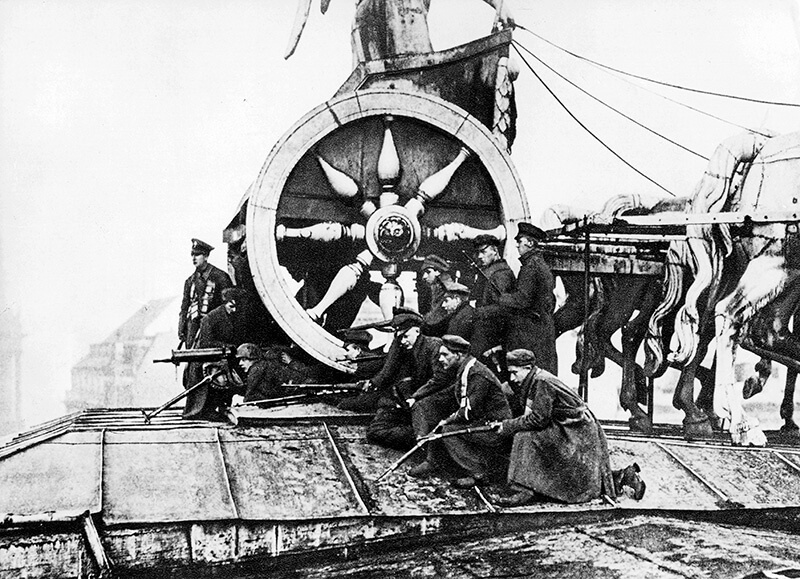
Soldiers firing round the quadriga in the Spartacist uprising, 7 January 1919

The Brandenburg Gate has played different political roles in German history. After the 1806 Prussian defeat at the Battle of Jena-Auerstedt, Napoleon was the first to use the Brandenburg Gate for a triumphal procession, and took its quadriga to Paris. After Napoleon's defeat in 1814 and the Prussian occupation of Paris by General Ernst von Pfuel, the quadriga was restored to Berlin. It was then redesigned by Karl Friedrich Schinkel for the new role of the Brandenburg Gate as a Prussian triumphal arch. The goddess, now definitely Victoria, was equipped with the Prussian eagle and Iron Cross on her lance with a wreath of oak leaves.

The quadriga faces east, as it did when it was originally installed in 1793. Only the royal family was allowed to pass through the central archway, as well as members of the Pfuel family, from 1814 to 1919. The Kaiser granted this honour to the family in gratitude to Ernst von Pfuel, who had overseen the return of the quadriga to the top of the gate. In addition, the central archway was also used by the coaches of ambassadors on the single occasion of their presenting their letters of credence to council.

After 1900, due to weathering and environmental damage, smaller and larger pieces of stone began to fall from the gate. Comprehensive renovation work began in 1913, which had to be interrupted by the outbreak of World War I and was not completed until 1926. Meanwhile, the events of the November Revolution had led to further significant damage, particularly to the quadriga. Indeed, the gate was used as a firing position by government troops during both the Spartacist uprising of January 1919 and the Kapp Putsch in March 1920. The restoration work was carried out on site under the direction of Kurt Kluge. For this purpose, the quadriga was encased in a wooden structure. Berliners spoke of the "highest horse stable in Berlin", but regardless of the weather, the work could be carried out in the dry without any delay. The numerous sandstone reliefs were restored and partially renovated under the artistic direction of Wilhelm Wandschneider, who remodeled one of the centaur metopes with a different motif.

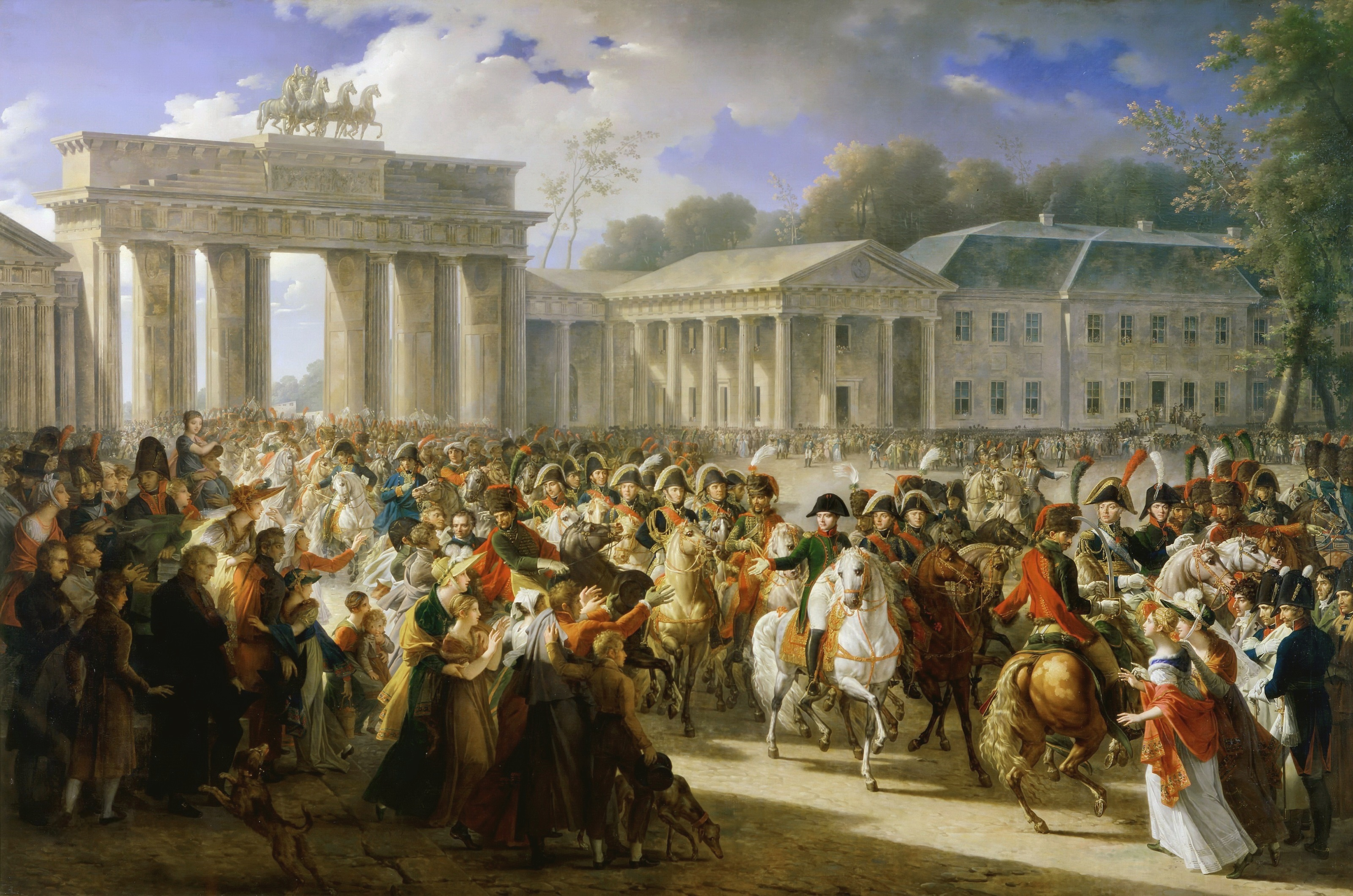
Entry of Napoleon into Berlin in 1806 after the Battle of Jena-Auerstedt, by Charles Meynier, 1810

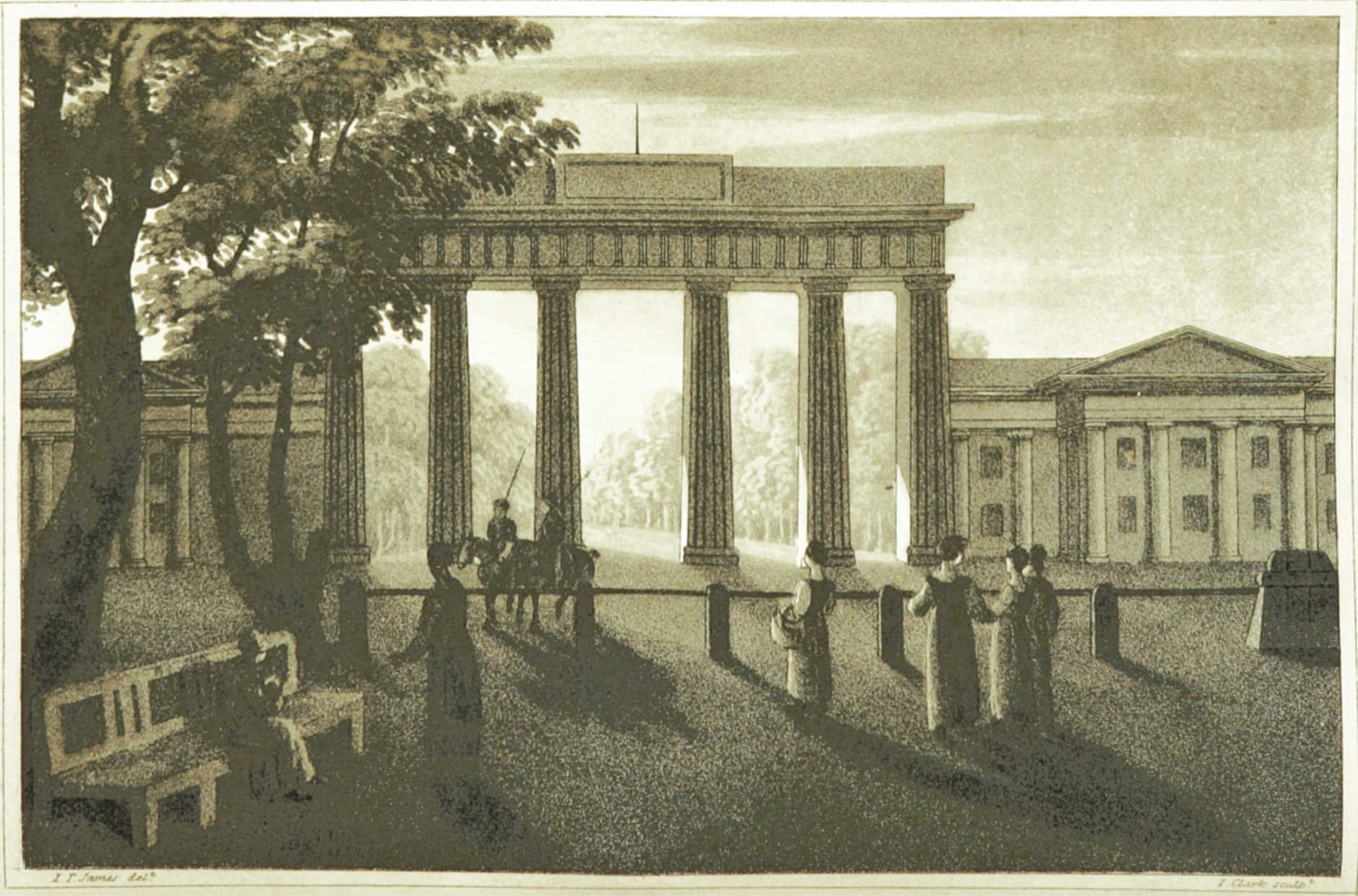
View without the quadriga, 1813. It was restored after Napoleon's defeat.

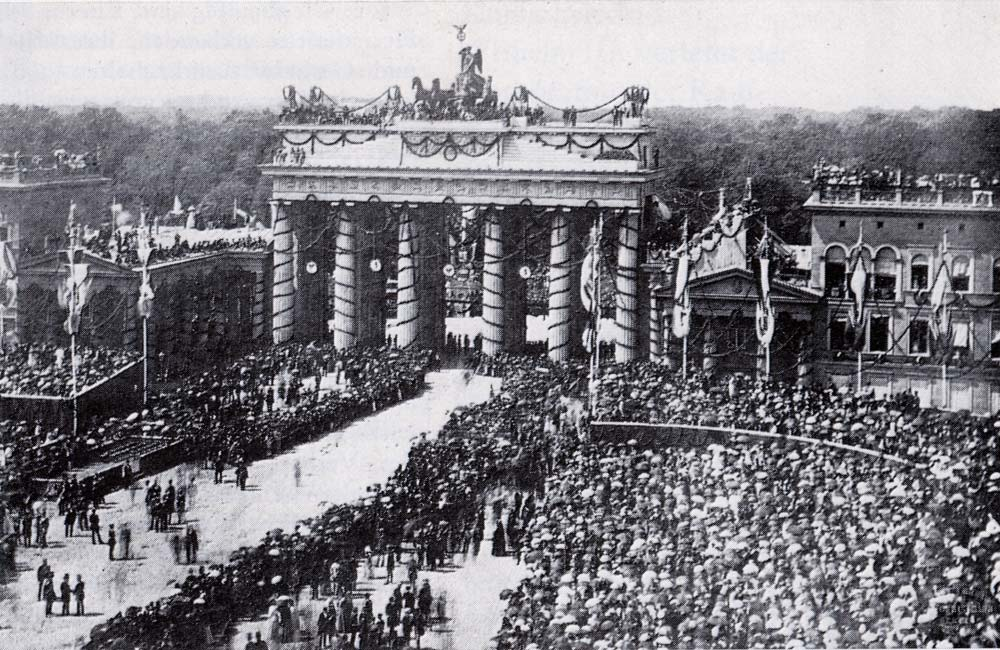
In 1871 with decorations and victorious Prussian troops after the Franco-Prussian War

=== Nazi Germany and World War II ===
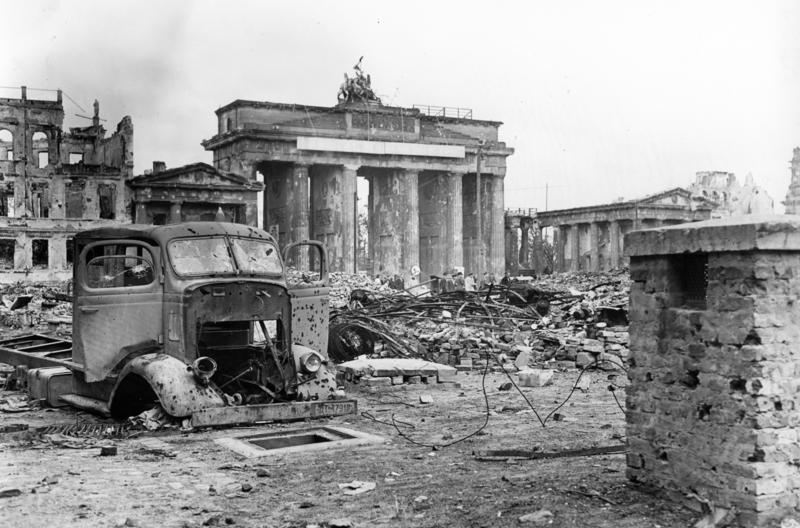
View from Pariser Platz in June 1945, after the fall of Berlin

In 1945, damaged state just after the end of World War II

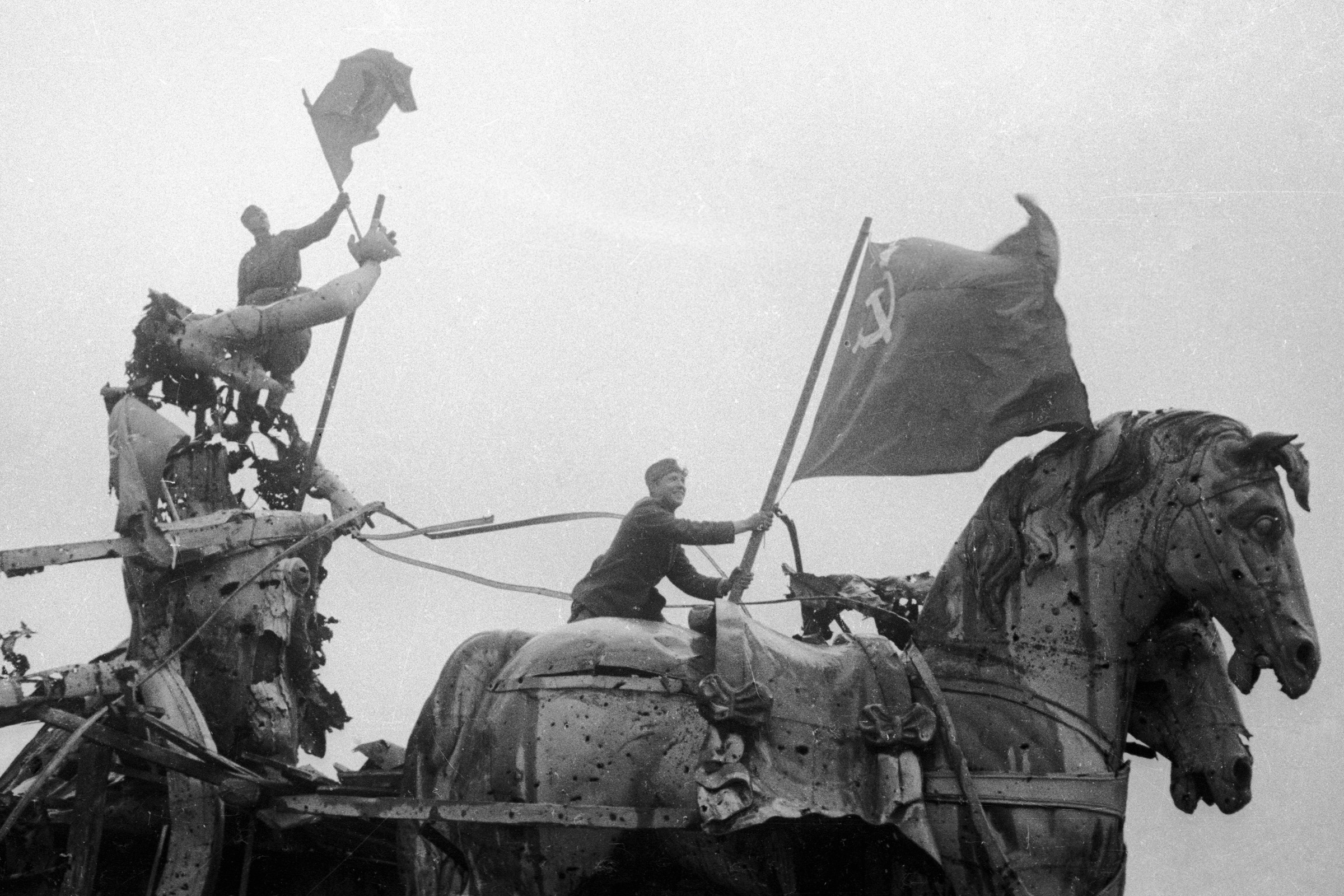
Soviet troops raising the Red Banner on the quadriga after the fall of Berlin

When the Nazis ascended to power, they used the gate as a party symbol. As part of Berlin's transformation into the so-called "world capital Germania", the gate was located on the east–west axis. A seven-kilometer-long section between the Brandenburg Gate and Adolf-Hitler-Platz (today Theodor-Heuss-Platz) was extended and put into operation in 1939. During the further expansion of the east–west axis, which never materialised, one of the plans was to move the side porticos away from the Brandenburg Gate. Traffic would then have been routed not only through, but also around the gate.

The gate survived World War II and was one of the damaged structures still standing in the Pariser Platz ruins in 1945 (another being the Academy of Fine Arts). The gate was badly damaged with holes in the columns from bullets and nearby explosions. One horse's head from the original quadriga survived, and is today kept in the collection of the Märkisches Museum. Efforts to disguise the government district of Berlin and confuse Allied bombers had included the construction of a replica Brandenburg Gate located away from the city centre.

=== Cold War ===
After Germany's surrender at the end of World War II, the Brandenburg Gate stood in the Soviet occupation zone, directly adjacent to the British sector. This boundary later became the border between East and West Berlin. Initially, the Flag of the Soviet Union was raised atop the monument. On 17 June 1953, amid the East German uprising of 1953, three men scaled the gate, removed the Soviet flag, and hoisted the black-red-gold flag shared by both German states. One of these men, Wolfgang Panzer, went missing shortly after and likely paid for the action with his life. Despite this turmoil, the standard black, red, and gold tricolour flag flew from the Brandenburg Gate from 1949 until 1959, serving as a shared symbol before East Germany altered its design.

On 21 September 1956, the East Berlin magistrate decided to restore the damaged monument, which was the only surviving city gate. Despite fierce arguments and mutual accusations, East and West Berlin collaborated on the project. Workers patched the structural holes, though the repairs remained visible for years. The quadriga was entirely recreated using a 1942 plaster cast. Sculptor Otto Schnitzer and the traditional Hermann Noack foundry in Friedenau completed the reconstruction, and the restoration finished on 14 December 1957. The Iron Cross atop the quadriga was replaced with a wreath, reflecting the original design. On 7 October 1959, the Flag of East Germany was raised on the roof to mark the 10th anniversary of the country's founding.

Vehicles and pedestrians could travel freely through the gate until the day after construction began on the Berlin Wall on Barbed Wire Sunday, 13 August 1961. After constructing the initial wall, the East German government had planned to demolish the gate as a symbol of Prussian militarism; however those plans were later abandoned. West Berliners gathered on the western side of the gate to demonstrate against the Berlin Wall, among them West Berlin's mayor, Willy Brandt, who had returned from a federal election campaign tour in West Germany earlier the same day. The wall passed directly by the western side of the gate, closing it throughout the Berlin Wall period, which ended on 22 December 1989. The Iron Cross returned after German reunification, and remains in place today.

The Brandenburg Gate during the Cold War near the Berlin Wall

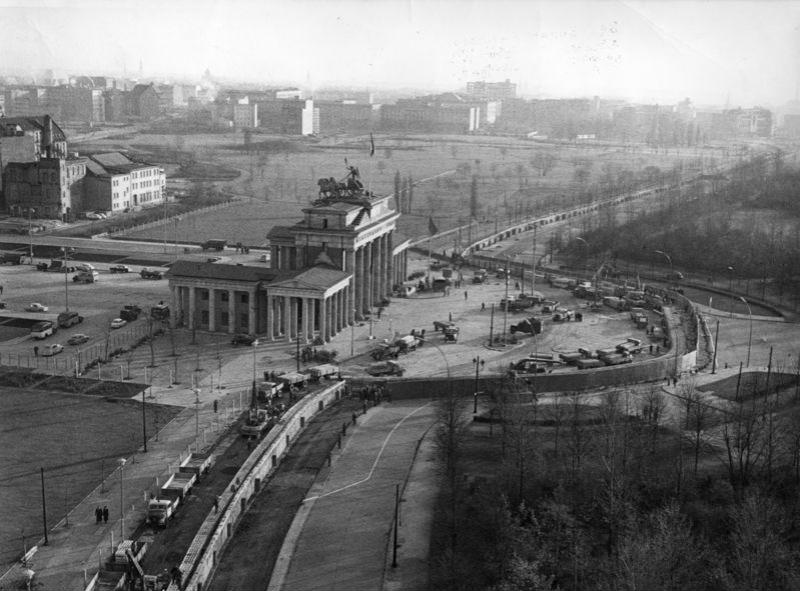
Aerial view of the Berlin Wall near the gate, summer/autumn 1961

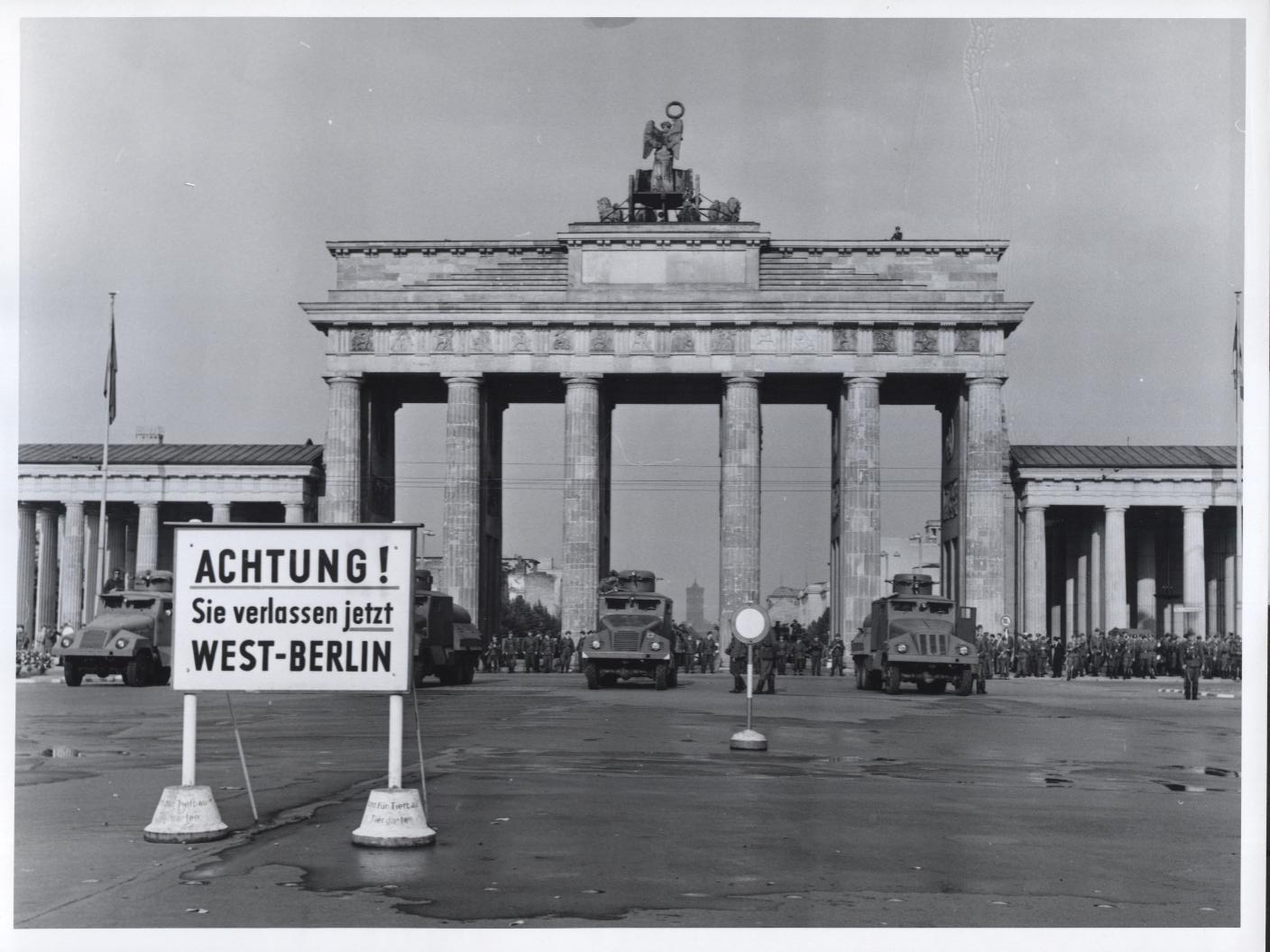
East German troops line up along the border, August 1961

In 1984, East Berliners and others were kept away from the gate, which they could view only from this distance.

=== 1989–present ===
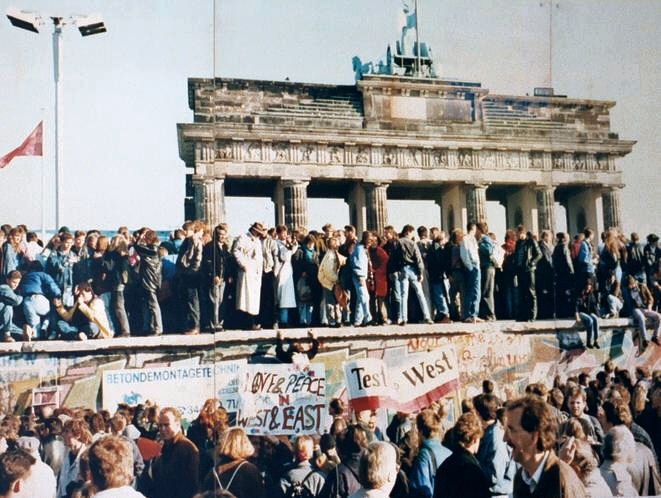
The Berlin Wall in front of the gate, shortly before its fall in 1989

When the Revolutions of 1989 occurred and the wall was demolished, the gate symbolized freedom and the desire to unify the city of Berlin. Thousands of people gathered at the wall to celebrate its fall on 9 November 1989. On 22 December 1989, the Brandenburg Gate border crossing was reopened when Helmut Kohl, the West German chancellor, walked through to be greeted by Hans Modrow, the East German prime minister. Demolition of the rest of the wall around the area took place the following year. In 1990, the quadriga was removed from the gate as part of renovation work carried out by the East German authorities following the fall of the wall in November 1989. Germany was officially reunified in October 1990.

The Brandenburg Gate was privately refurbished on 21 December 2000, at a cost of €6 million. It was once again opened on 3 October 2002 following extensive refurbishment, for the 12th anniversary of German reunification. On this occasion, the Berlin office of Kardorff Ingenieure developed a new lighting concept that emphasises the gate as the most important building on the Pariser Platz.

The Brandenburg Gate became the main venue for the 20th-anniversary celebrations of the fall of the Berlin Wall or "Festival of Freedom" on the evening of 9 November 2009. The high point of the celebrations was when over 1000 colourfully designed foam domino tiles, each over 2.5 metres (8 ft 2 in) tall, were lined up along the route of the former wall through the city centre. The domino "wall" was then toppled in stages converging here.

The Brandenburg Gate is now again closed to vehicle traffic, and much of the Pariser Platz has been turned into a cobblestone pedestrian zone. The gate, along with the broad Straße des 17. Juni avenue to the west, is also one of the large public areas in Berlin where over a million people can gather to watch stage shows or party together, watch major sport events shown on huge screens, or see fireworks at midnight on New Year's Eve. After winning the 2014 FIFA World Cup, the Germany national football team held their victory rally in front of the gate.

It has also hosted street events at 2009 IAAF World Championships in Athletics and repeated its role in 2018 European Athletics Championships. It is also the usual finish line of the Berlin Marathon.

Traffic through the gate in the 1990s

With the Pariser Platz in 2005, following restoration and pedestrianization

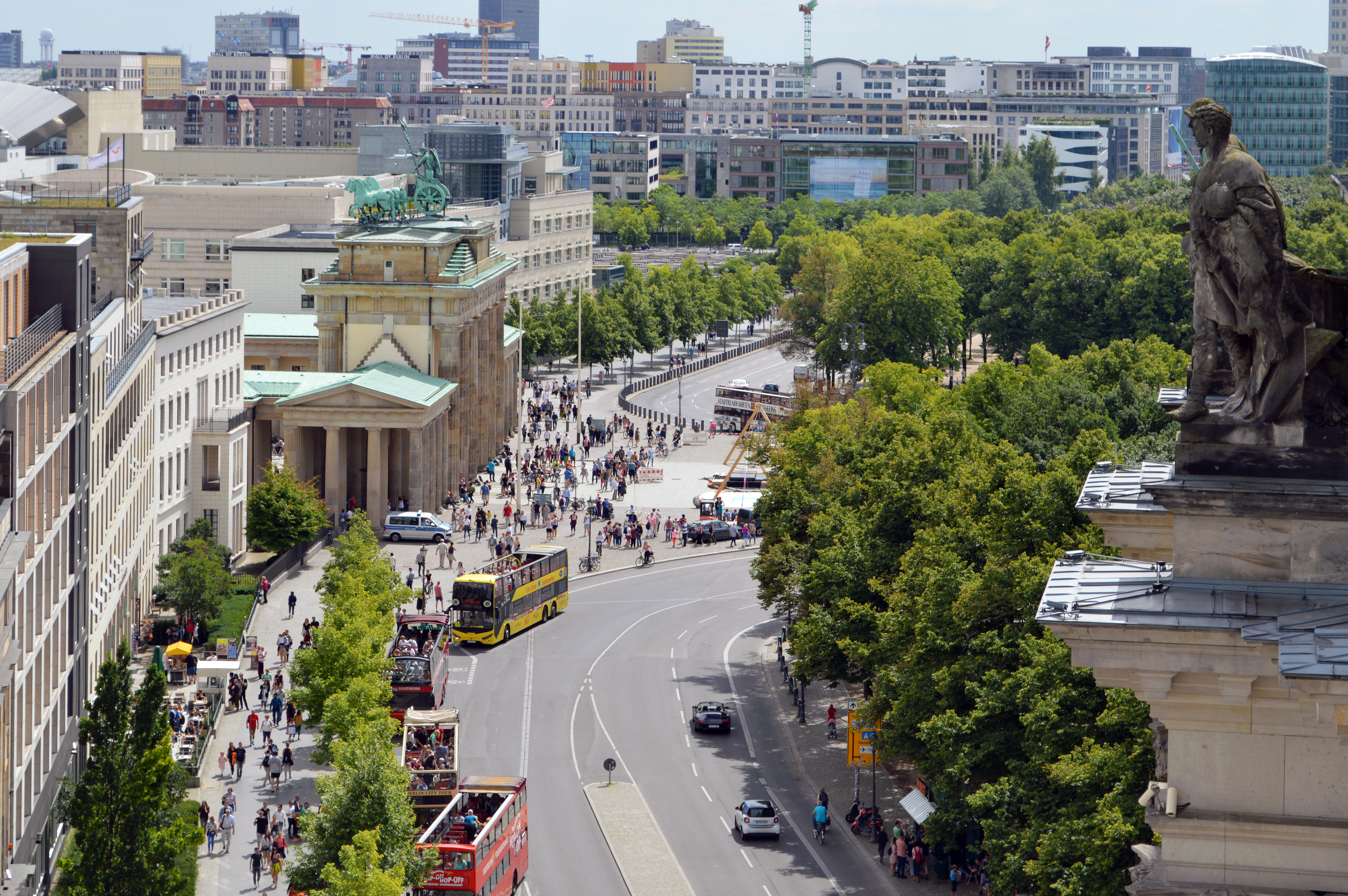
Seen from the rooftop terrace of the Reichstag building

=== Vandalism ===
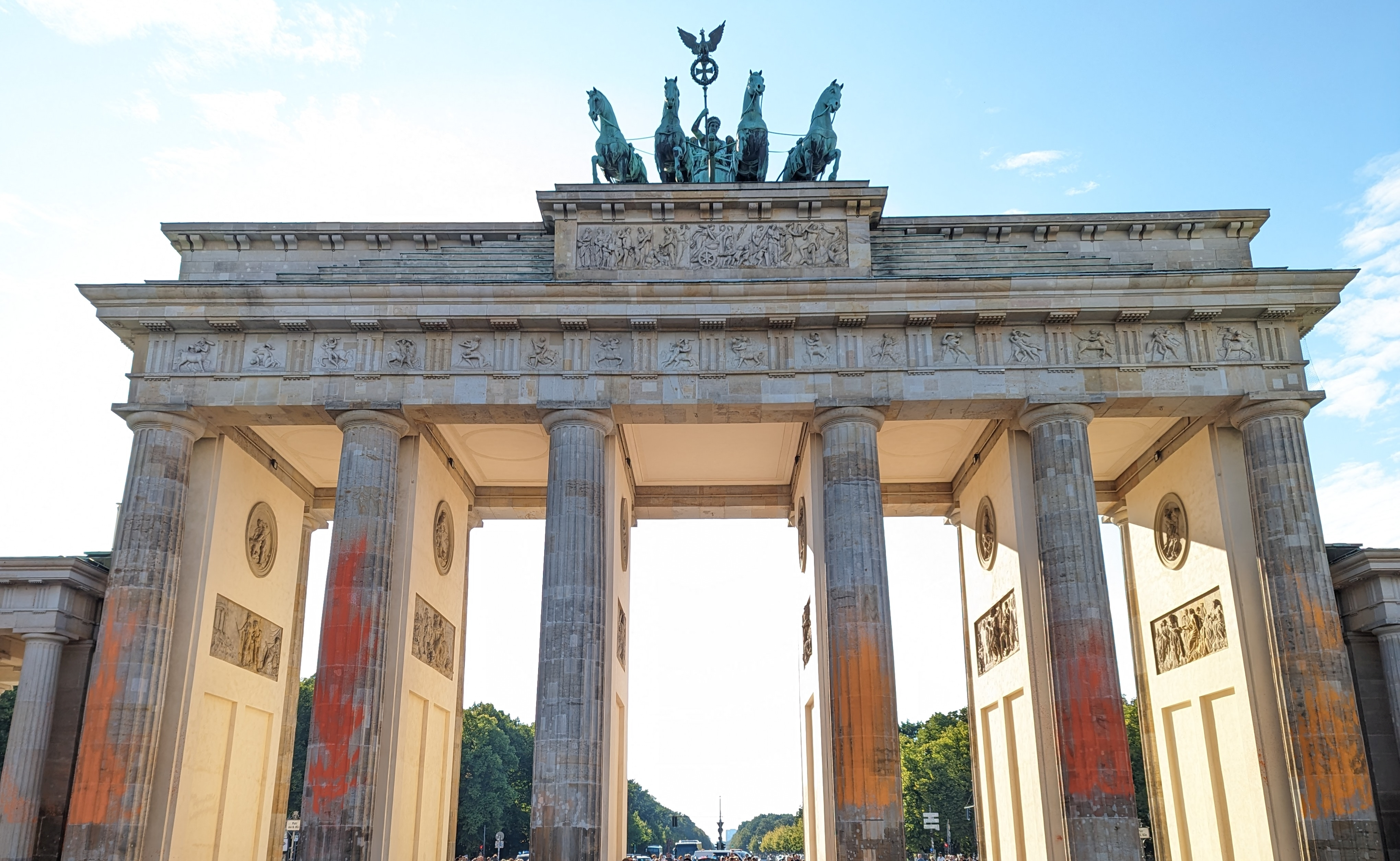
Vandalism by Last Generation activists using orange paint, 17 September 2023

On 17 September 2023, German climate activists from the Last Generation group used fire extinguishers to spray paint the Brandenburg Gate's columns orange. Fourteen people connected to the vandalism were detained by Berlin Police. The incident received criticism from the mayor of Berlin, Kai Wegner, who condemned the tactics, saying they "go beyond legitimate forms of protest". The mayor went on to say, "With these actions, this group is not only damaging the historic Brandenburg Gate, but also our free discourse about the important issues of our time and future".

== Political history ==
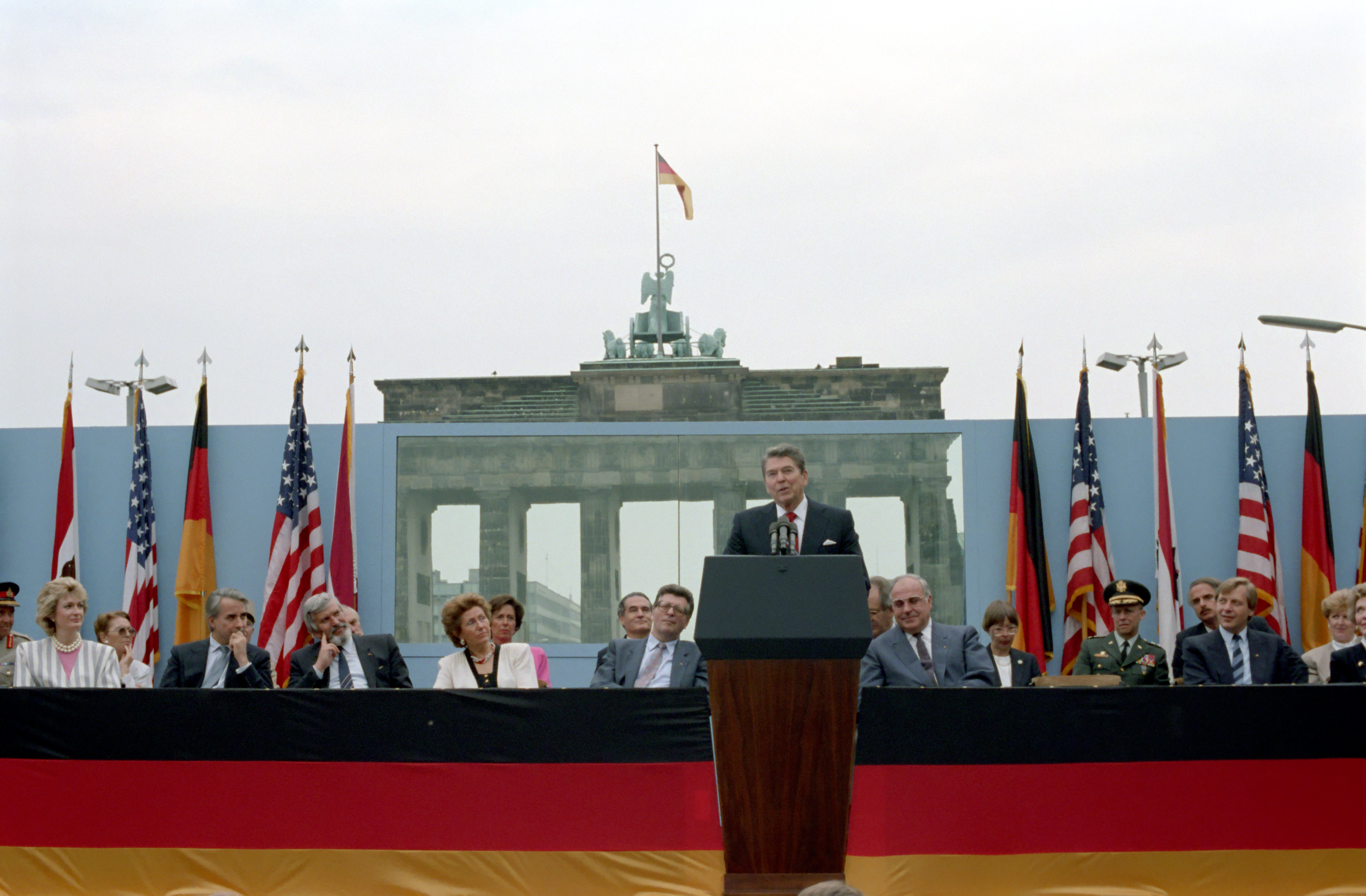
Ronald Reagan speaking at the gate section of the Berlin Wall on 12 June 1987, challenging Mikhail Gorbachev to "tear down this wall!"

Tear down this wall
Complete speech by Ronald Reagan at the Brandenburg Gate, 12 June 1987

A Soviet flag flew from a flagpole atop the gate from 1945 until 1957, when it was replaced by an East German flag. Since the reunification of Germany in 1990, the flag and the pole have been removed. During the 1953 riots in East Berlin, the Soviet flag was torn off by West Germans.

In 1963, U.S. President John F. Kennedy visited the Brandenburg Gate. The Soviets hung large red banners across it to prevent him looking into East Berlin.

In the 1980s, decrying the existence of two German states and two Berlins, West Berlin mayor Richard von Weizsäcker said: "The German Question is open as long as the Brandenburg Gate is closed."

On 12 June 1987, U.S. President Ronald Reagan spoke to the West Berlin populace at the Brandenburg Gate, demanding the razing of the Berlin Wall. Addressing the General Secretary of the Communist Party of the Soviet Union, Mikhail Gorbachev, Reagan said,

General Secretary Gorbachev, if you seek peace, if you seek prosperity for the Soviet Union and Eastern Europe, if you seek liberalization: Come here to this gate! Mr. Gorbachev, open this gate! Mr. Gorbachev, tear down this wall!

On 25 December 1989, less than two months after the Berlin Wall began to come down, the conductor Leonard Bernstein conducted the Berlin Philharmonic in a version of the Ninth Symphony of Beethoven at the then newly opened Brandenburg Gate. In the concluding choral movement of the symphony, the "Ode to Joy", the word Freude ("Joy") was replaced with Freiheit ("Freedom") to celebrate the fall of the Wall and the imminent reunification of Germany.

On 2–3 October 1990, the Brandenburg Gate was the scene of the official ceremony to mark the reunification of Germany. At the stroke of midnight on 3 October, the black-red-gold flag of West Germany—now the flag of a reunified Germany—was raised over the gate.

On 12 July 1994, U.S. President Bill Clinton spoke at the Brandenburg Gate about peace in post–Cold War Europe.

On 9 November 2009, Chancellor Angela Merkel walked through the Brandenburg Gate with Russia's Mikhail Gorbachev and Poland's Lech Wałęsa as part of the 20th anniversary of the fall of the Berlin Wall.

On 13 August 2011, Germany marked the 50th anniversary of the day the Berlin Wall began construction with a memorial service and a minute of silence in memory of those who died trying to flee to the West. "It is our shared responsibility to keep the memory alive and to pass it on to the coming generations as a reminder to stand up for freedom and democracy to ensure that such injustice may never happen again," Berlin Mayor Klaus Wowereit said. German Chancellor Angela Merkel—who grew up behind the wall in Germany's communist eastern part—also attended the commemoration. German President Christian Wulff added, "It has been shown once again: Freedom is invincible at the end. No wall can permanently withstand the desire for freedom."

On 19 June 2013, U.S. President Barack Obama spoke at the Gate about nuclear arms reduction and the recently revealed U.S. internet surveillance activities.

On the night of 5 January 2015, the lights illuminating the gate were completely shut off in protest against a protest held by far-right anti-Islamic group Pegida.

In April 2017, Die Zeit noted that the gate was not illuminated in Russian colours after the 2017 Saint Petersburg Metro bombing. The gate was previously illuminated after attacks in Jerusalem and Orlando. The Berlin Senate only allows the gate to be illuminated for events in partner cities and cities with a special connection to Berlin.

In February 2022, the gate was lit up with the colours of the Ukrainian flag, during the 2022 Russian invasion of Ukraine. A candlelight vigil was also held in front of the gate on the 31st Independence Day of Ukraine.

On 7 October 2023, the gate was lit up with the flag of Israel, after the October 7 attacks.

Illuminations for expressions of solidarity of the German people

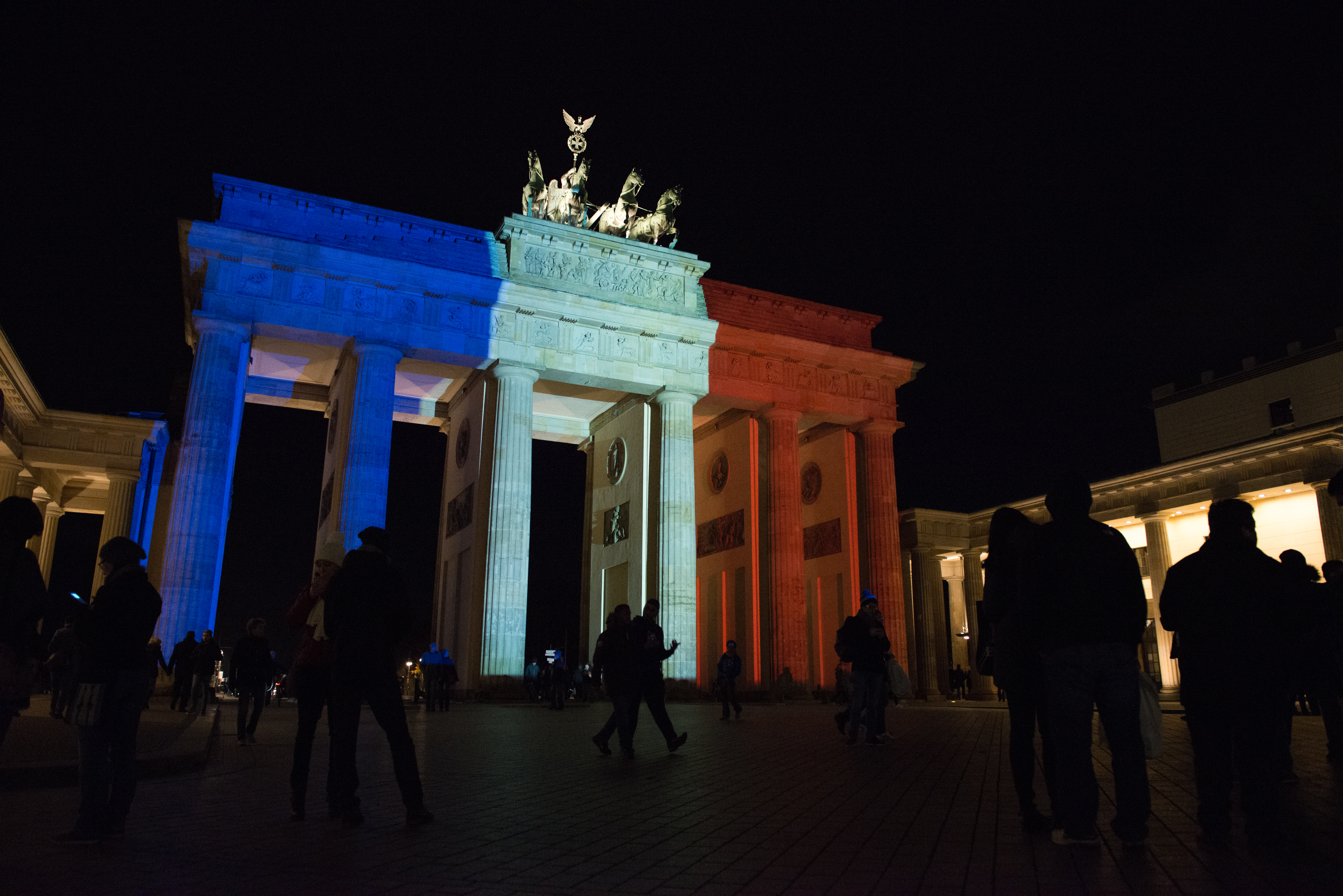
Lit up with the colours of the French flag after the November 2015 Paris attacks

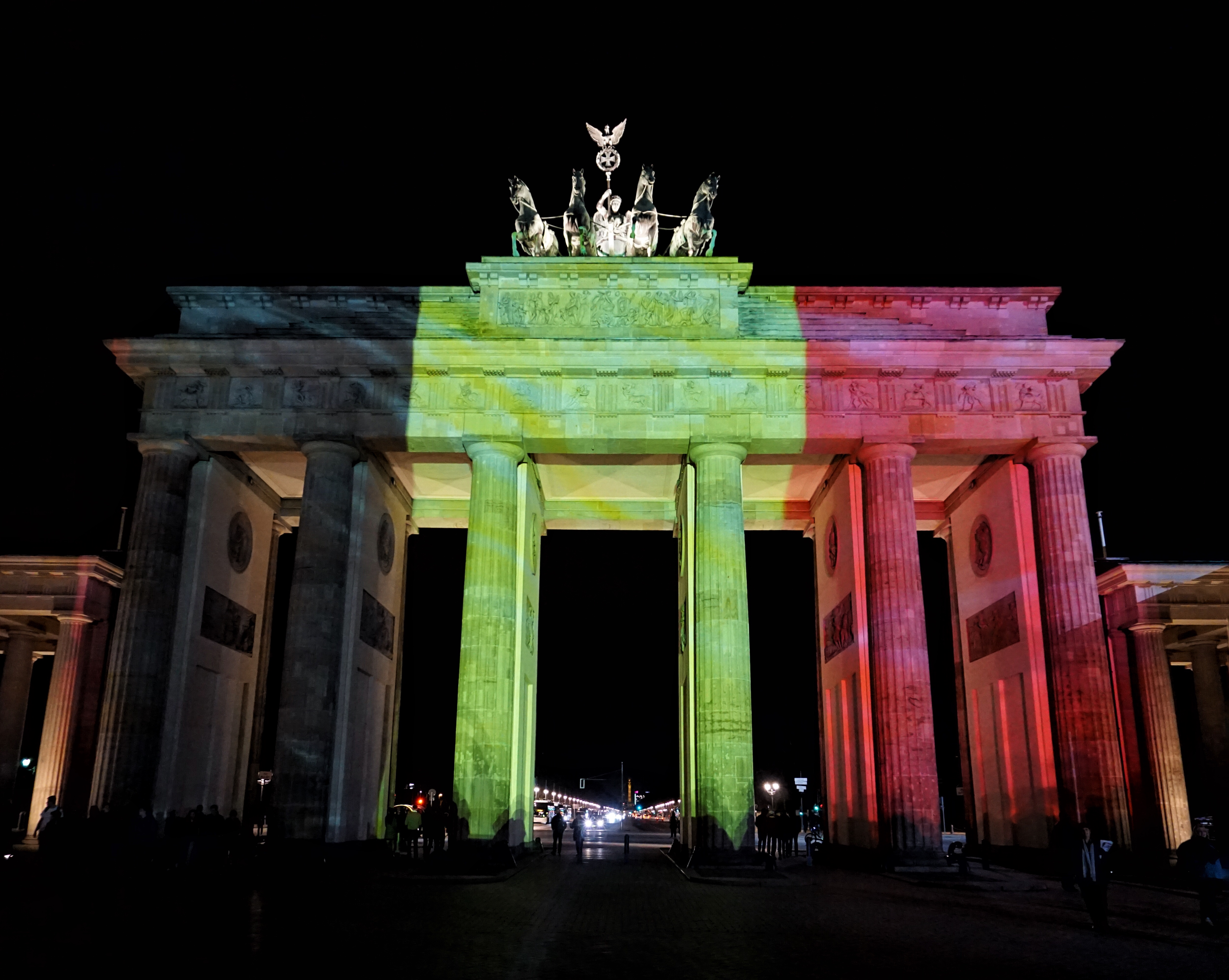
Lit up with the colours of the Belgian flag after the 2016 Brussels bombings

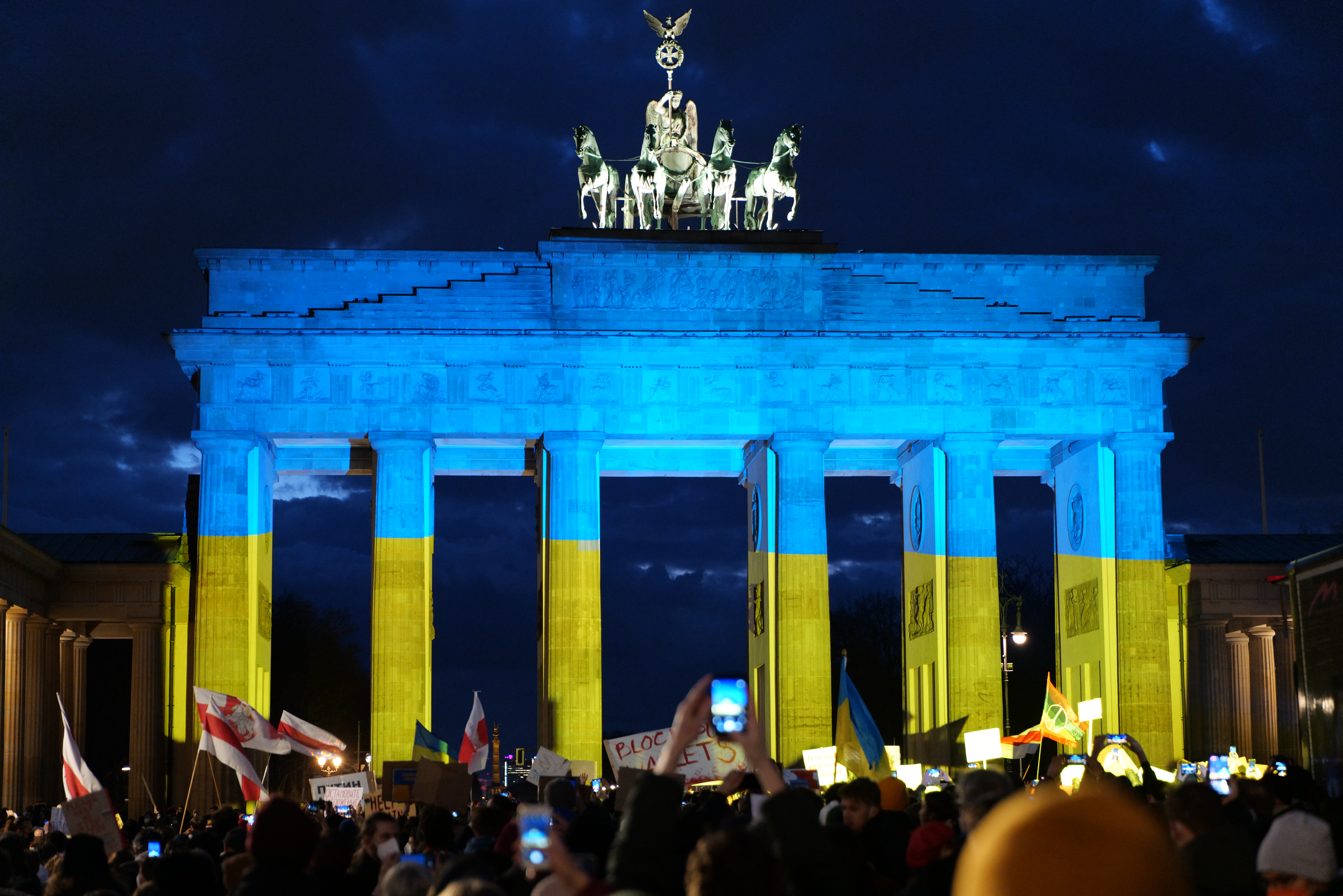
Lit up in the colours of the Ukrainian flag during a solidarity protest, 24 February 2022

== See also ==
- List of tourist attractions in Berlin
- Puerta de Alcalá – a similar structure in Madrid
- Siegestor – a similar structure in Bavaria
