= Ebertstraße =

Street in Berlin, Germany

- Ebertstrasse
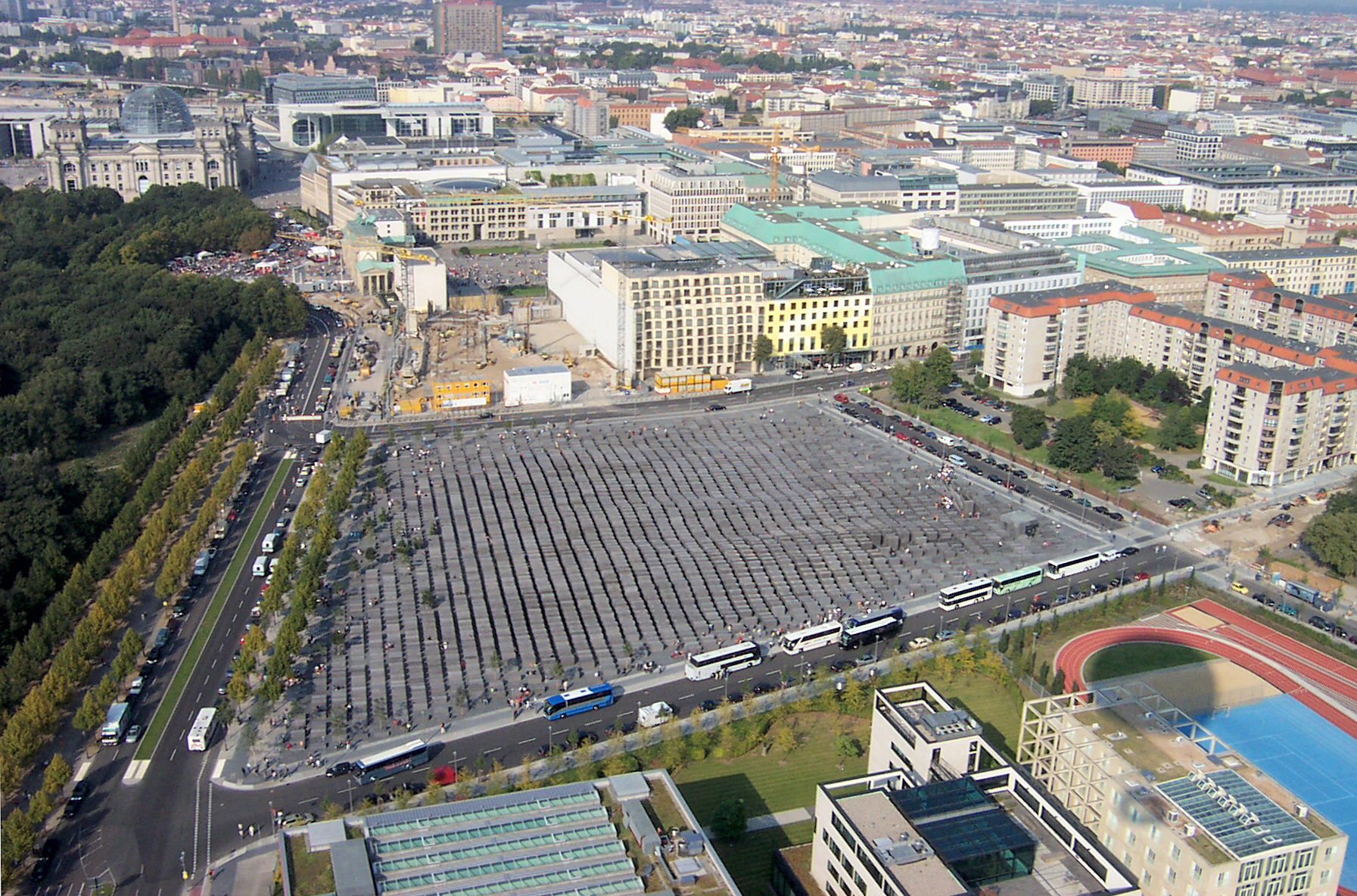
- Ebertstraße with Reichstag, Brandenburg Gate and Holocaust Memorial in September 2005. (Note: Ebertstraße is on the left, running northwards, along the eastern edge of the Tiergarten, up to the Brandenburg Gate, visible near the Reichstag (top left corner). Just below the Brandenburg Gate the new United States Embassy is under construction. The Memorial to the Murdered Jews of Europe, with its 2,711 slabs, occupies the centre of the picture, and at the bottom are new office buildings in the Ministergarten. This was roughly the location of the mammoth stage for Roger Waters' The Wall concert on 21 July 1990.)
- Interactive map of Ebertstraße
- Former names: Kasernenstraße; (North end: c. 1767–1859); Sommerstraße; (North end: 1859–1925); Schulgartenstraße; (Main part/west: 1831–1867); Brandenburgische Kommunikation; (Main part/east: 1845–1867); Königgrätzer Straße; (Main part: 1867–1915); Budapester Straße; (Main part: 1915–1925); Friedrich-Ebert-Straße; (Whole street: 1925–1933); Hermann-Göring-Straße; (Whole street: 1933–1945)
- Namesake: Friedrich Ebert
- Type: Street
- Length: 600 m (2,000 ft)
- Location: Berlin, Germany
- Quarter: Mitte, Tiergarten
- Nearest metro station: Brandenburger Tor; Potsdamer Platz
- Coordinates: 52°30′48″N 13°22′38″E
- North end: Scheidemannstraße; Dorotheenstraße; Platz des 18. März; Brandenburg Gate
- Major junctions: Behrenstraße; Hannah-Arendt-Straße; Lennéstraße; In den Ministergärten; Voßstraße
- South end: Potsdamer Platz; Potsdamer Straße; Leipziger Platz; Leipziger Straße; Stresemannstraße

Ebertstraße, or Ebertstrasse (see ß), is a street in Berlin, the capital of Germany. It runs on a roughly north-south line from the Brandenburg Gate to Potsdamer Platz in the centre of the city.

As one heads south down Ebertstraße, the Tiergarten, a large forested park, is to one's right, and the new United States Embassy to the left. Across the corner of Behrenstraße on the left is the Memorial to the Murdered Jews of Europe. Beyond that is the Ministergarten, which was once the gardens at the rear of the old Foreign Office building in Wilhelmstraße, and now the location of numerous modern office buildings. At the southern end of the street, past the corner of Lennéstraße on the right, is the new entertainment precinct around the rebuilt Potsdamer Platz.

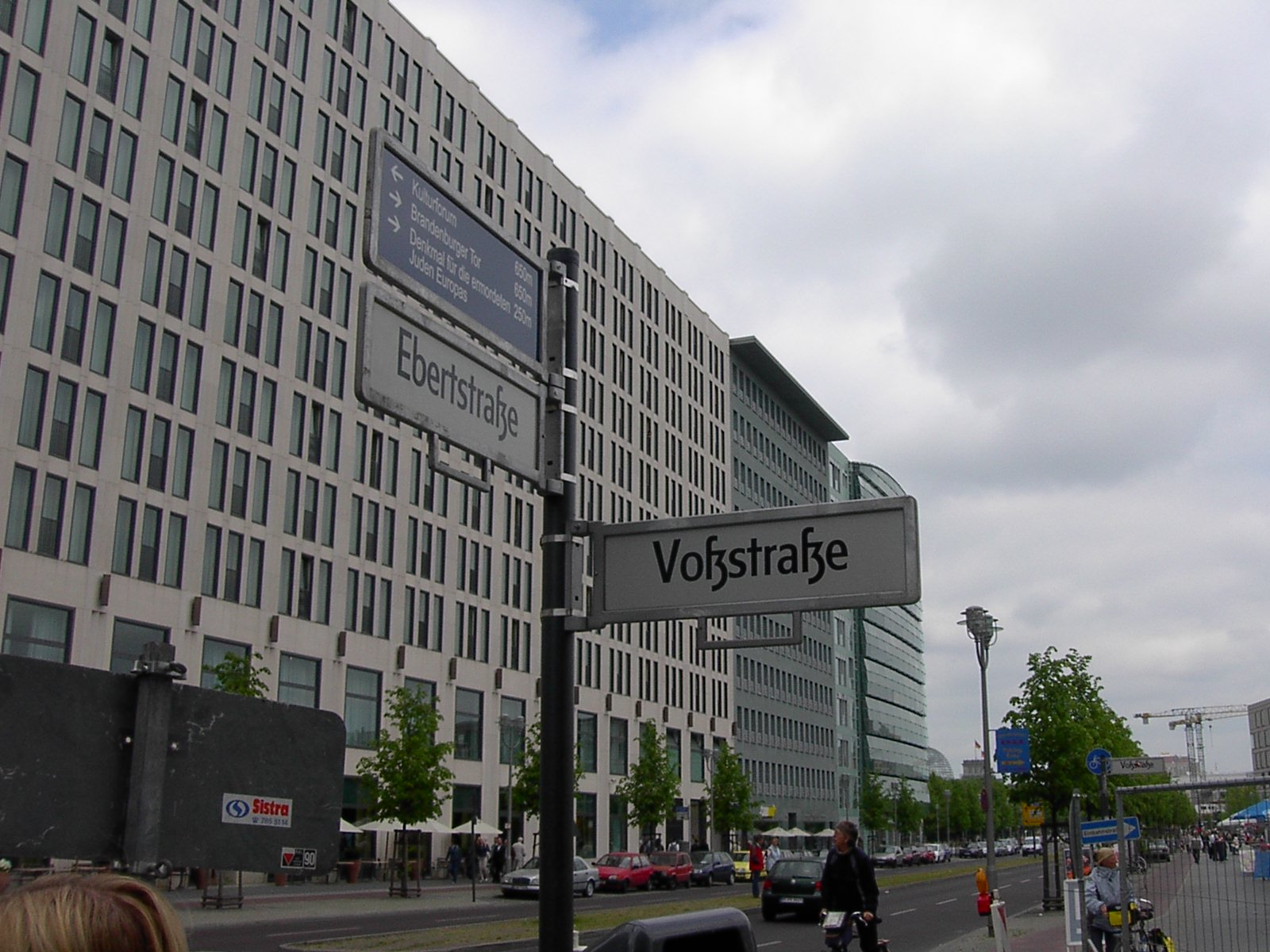
Looking north up Ebertstraße from the corner of Voßstraße. The buildings are part of the Beisheim Center in the new Potsdamer Platz development.

The street follows the line of the walls of the mediaeval Prussian fortress town of Berlin, linking the Brandenburg Gate with the Potsdam Gate, which stood where Potsdamer Platz now is. After the demolition of the walls it was laid out as a street. Following the Austro-Prussian War in 1866, it was named Königgrätzer Straße in honour of the Prussian victory over Austria at the Battle of Königgrätz. After World War I, this name was considered unsuitably militaristic, and the street was renamed "Budapester Straße" (the street south of the Tiergarten now called Budapester Straße was at that time an eastwards continuation of the Kurfürstendamm). After the death of the first President of the Weimar Republic, Friedrich Ebert, in 1925, it was renamed Ebertstraße in 1930, but in 1935, under the Nazi regime, it was called Hermann-Göring-Straße, after Reichsmarschall Hermann Göring, whose official residence was close by.

In the mid-1930s almost the entire street was dug up for the building of the S-Bahn "north-south link" line from Unter den Linden to Yorckstraße, via Potsdamer Platz and Anhalter Bahnhof. The idea for such a link had first been mooted in 1914, but detailed plans were not drawn up until 1928, and then approval had to wait until 1933. Construction began in 1934, but determination to have it finished in time for the Berlin Olympic Games in 1936 meant safety measures were ignored: on 20 August 1935 a tunnel collapse just south of the Brandenburg Gate buried twenty-three workmen of whom only four survived; then on 28 December 1936 a fire near Potsdamer Platz station destroyed vital equipment. The section did not finally open until 15 April 1939.

On 31 July 1947, after World War II, the street was renamed back to Ebertstraße. From 1961 to 1989 the Berlin Wall ran along most of its length.

== See also ==
- List of streets named after Hermann Göring
- Mitte (locality)
- Platz des 18. März
