= Georg Wrba =

German sculptor and graphic artist

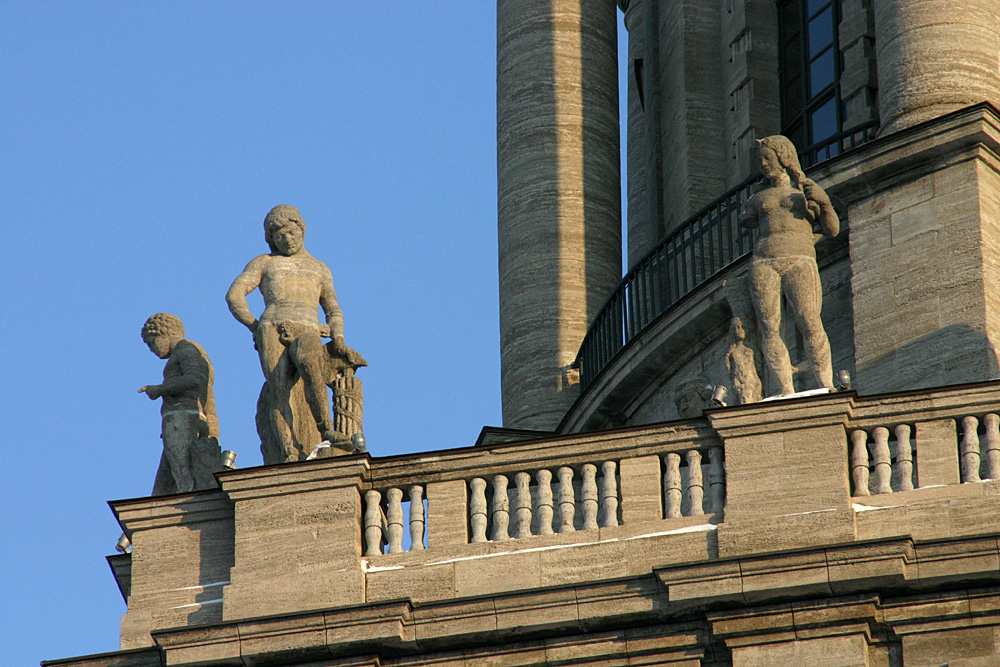
Allegories of the Civic Virtues on the Altes Stadthaus, Berlin

Georg Wrba (3 January 1872 – 9 January 1939) was a German sculptor and graphic artist. He created some 3,000–4,000 works, including as a collaborator of the Zwinger workshop.

== Life ==
Wrba was born in Munich in 1872, the son of a smith. His younger brother Max Wrba became an architect in Dresden.

Wrba began his training with Jakob Bradl the Elder and his son Jakob Bradl the Younger. From 1891 to 1896, he studied at the Akademie der Bildenden Künste München under Syrius Eberle.

After some time spent in Italy (with Egon Rheinberger), a trip made possible by a travel award from Prince Regent Luitpold, he settled in Munich as an independent sculptor in 1897 and became director of the city's school of sculpture.

In 1906 and 1907, he worked in Berlin, where he created sculptures for buildings for the architects Ludwig Hoffmann and Alfred Messel.

Wrba then moved to Dresden, where from 1907 to 1930 he taught at the Dresden Academy of Fine Arts. He brought the Dresden school of sculpture into contact with the reforming ideas of the Deutscher Werkbund and was a founding member of the Dresden Artists' Association, known as "Die Zunft" ("The Guild"). The basic aim of the "Werkbund", and also of "Die Zunft", was to achieve a collaboration between and integration of various forms of art, rejecting ornamentation for its own sake: painting and sculpture were to form integral parts of architecture.

In Dresden he made, among many other works, the Marie Gey Fountain near the Dresden Hauptbahnhof in the Südvorstadt, which was donated by a Dr. Heinze for his wife, a student at the Kunstakademie, who had died young. In 1910 Wrba agreed a contract for the restoration and completion of the missing parts of the Zwinger, for which he directed the work of 53 sculptors from 1911 to 1933, and himself created many groups of figures modelled from the life.

Wrba died on 9 January 1939 in Dresden, where a street is named after him. He is buried in the Munich Waldfriedhof.

== Selected works ==
Georg Wrba's works principally comprise sculptures for buildings and fountains, and small-scale figures.

- 1899: Seal Fountain (Seehund-Brunnen) (bronze), Berlin, in the inner courtyard of the Rudolf Virchow Clinic
- 1899: sculptural decoration on the fountain of the Bismarck Tower (Bismarckturm) on the Starnberger See
- c. 1900: figures and carvings in St. Maximilian's Church, Munich
- 1900: Diana auf der Hirschkuh ("Diana on a Doe"), Kunsthalle Bremen
- 1900: Europa auf dem Stier ("Europa on the Bull"), Kunsthalle Bremen
- 1902: Warriors' Fountain (Kriegerbrunnen) in Nördlingen
- 1902: façade decoration on the extension building of the Kunsthalle Bremen
- 1905: St. Mang Fountain in Kempten
- 1905: marble bust of Luitpold, Prince Regent of Bavaria
- 1906: equestrian statue of Otto I von Wittelsbach, Wittelsbach Bridge, München
- 1906: Chicken Fountain (Hennebrunnen) in Aschersleben
- 1906–1908: putti for the Villa Wollner in Dresden
- 1906–1911: contributions to the decorative building sculptures on the Altes Stadthaus in Berlin, including "Allegories of the Civic Virtues" and the decor of the banqueting hall (Bärensaal – "Bears' Hall")
- 1907: allegorical bronze group on top of the Charlottenburg Gate by the Charlottenburg Bridge, Berlin (melted down)
- 1907: two marble portals with allegories in the entrance hall of the Kaufhaus des Westens in Berlin
- 1907: portraits of Georg Treu, Hans Erlwein, Otto Gussmann, Cornelius Gurlitt, Fritz Schumacher, Martin Dülfer
- 1908: altar figure of "The Good Shepherd" in the Church of the Reconciliation, Dresden
- 1909: Bismarck Fountain on the market place in Arnstadt
- 1910: group of "Bacchus on a Drunken Donkey" and two sitting bronze lions with shields on the east side, and the Hietzig Fountain on the west side, of the Neues Rathaus in Dresden
- 1910: figure of Aphrodite on the Marie Gey Fountain in the Friedrich-List-Platz in Dresden
- 1910: relief of "Siegfried's Entrance into Worms" on the Cornelianum in Worms
- 1910: bronze lions in front of the Neues Rathaus in Dresden
- 1911: Rathaus Fountain at the Neues Rathaus in Dresden
- 1912/1913: contributions to the Märchenbrunnen in the Volkspark Friedrichshain in Friedrichshain, Berlin
- 1911–1933: artistic director of the restoration works on the Zwinger, Dresden
- 1917: "Large Bathing Figures" (Große Badende) on a mussel shell (bronze) for a country house in Klein Flottbek owned by Max Emden; since 1928 on the Roman-style bathing pool of the palazzo of Max Emden on the Brissago Islands on Lake Maggiore, Switzerland
- 1911: bronze bust of Peter von Klemperer
- 1912: sculptural decorations on the Erker, the doorways and the fountain in the courtyard of the Rappolthaus in Hamburg
- 1918: Diana on a Doe, Stadtpark Hamburg
- 1918: Large Bathing Figures (Große Badende), Aschersleben
- 1918: portrait bust of Max Klinger
- 1921: statuette "Longing of Love" (Liebessehnsucht), Gera Art Gallery
- 1922: bronze bust of Carl Zeiß
- 1922: Europa Fountain on the Königsheimplatz in Dresden
- 1922: statuette "Naked Dancer" (Nackte Tänzerin), Bleichert Collection, Leipzig
- 1922: bronze bust of Gerhart Hauptmann
- 1922: "Small Sitting Figure arranging her Hair" (Kleine Sitzende, Haar ordnend)
- 1923: bronze bust of Alfred Tiedemann
- 1924: "The Kiss" (Der Kuss), in private ownership
- 1925–1930: monument to the fallen of World War I in the old graveyard in Wurzen, with Oswin Hempel and Arthur Lange (1875–1929)
- 1926: Mönckeberg Fountain in Hamburg (WV 273); construction of the fountain (to designs made in collaboration with the architect Fritz Schumacher) 1914–1920; completion of the side bronze figures 1926 (badly damaged in 1944; the lion was reconstructed by the Hamburg sculptor Philipp Harth in 1965)
- 1927: "Contemplating Figure" (Die Sinnende), in private ownership
- 1927: group of figures "Widow with two Children" (Witwe mit zwei Kindern) for the war memorial in Radebeul
- 1928: "Runner" (Läufer), in private ownership
- 1929: "Death the Cutter" (Der Schnitter Tod) for the crematorium in Forst
- 1929: market fountain in Rochlitz
- 1930/1934: gravestones for Bruno Steglich and the Wiede family in the graveyard of Trebsen
- 1932: large group of architectural sculpture inside the cathedral (Dom) in Wurzen
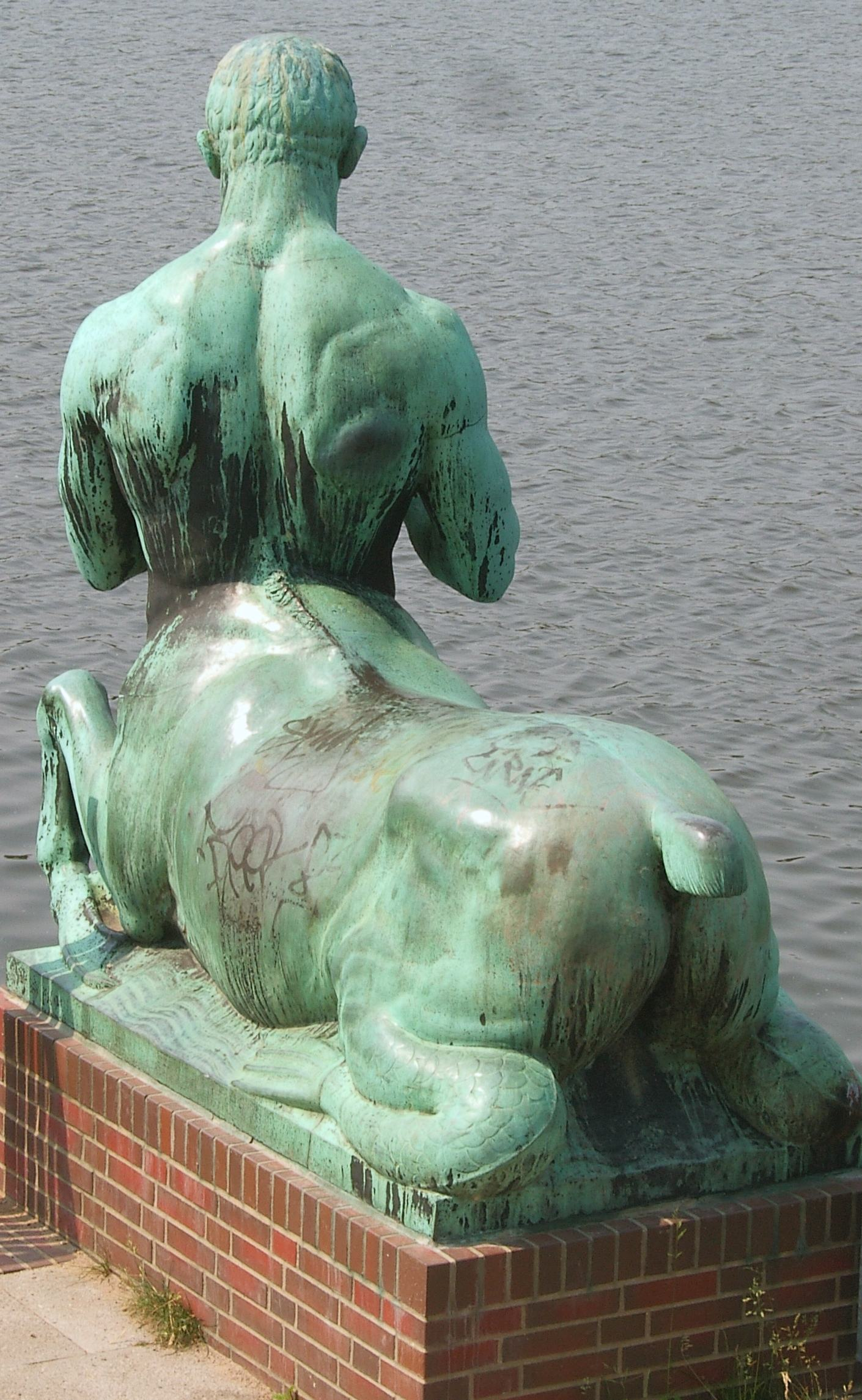
Triton Centaur (1912) in the Hamburg Stadtpark

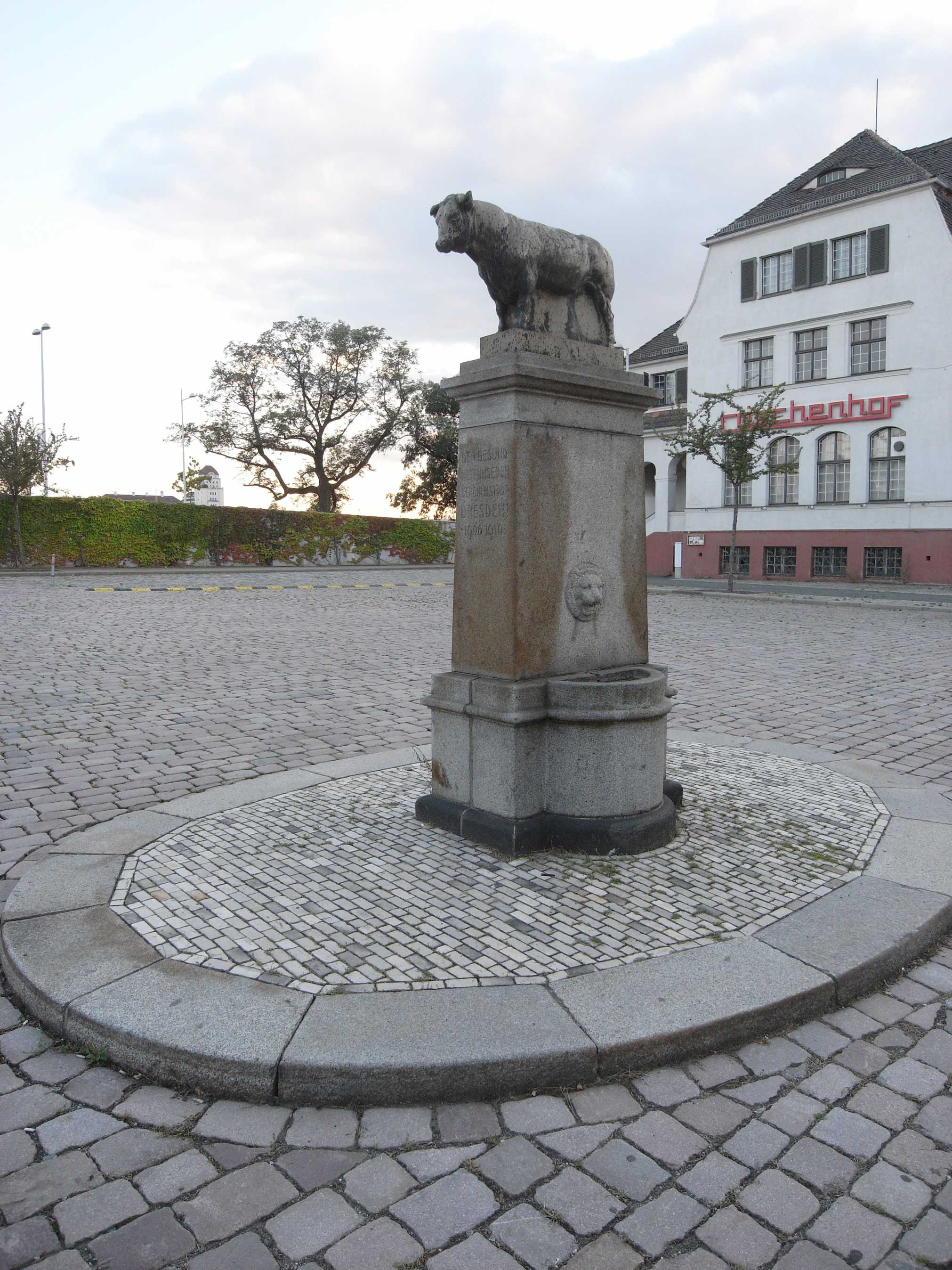
Bull Fountain in front of the former Dresden Abattoir, Grosses Ostragehege

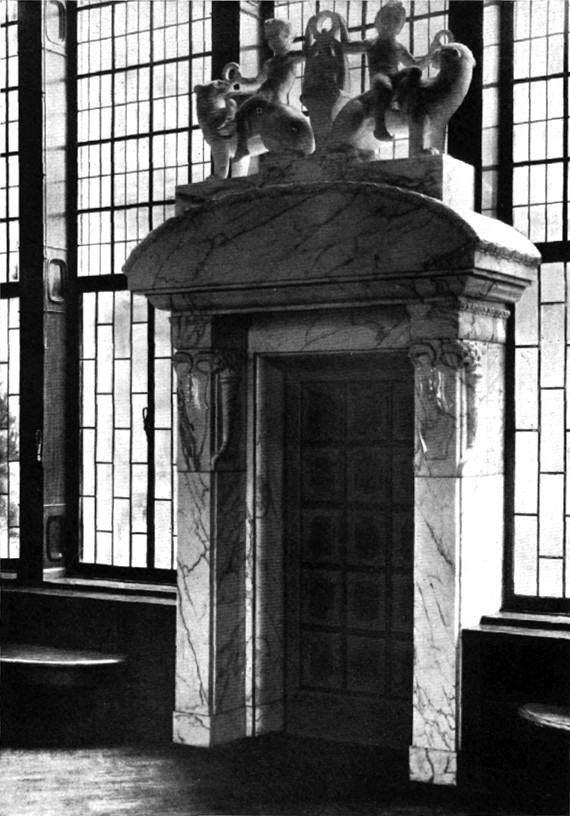
Side marble doorway in the entrance hall of the Kaufhaus des Westens (KaDeWe), 1908

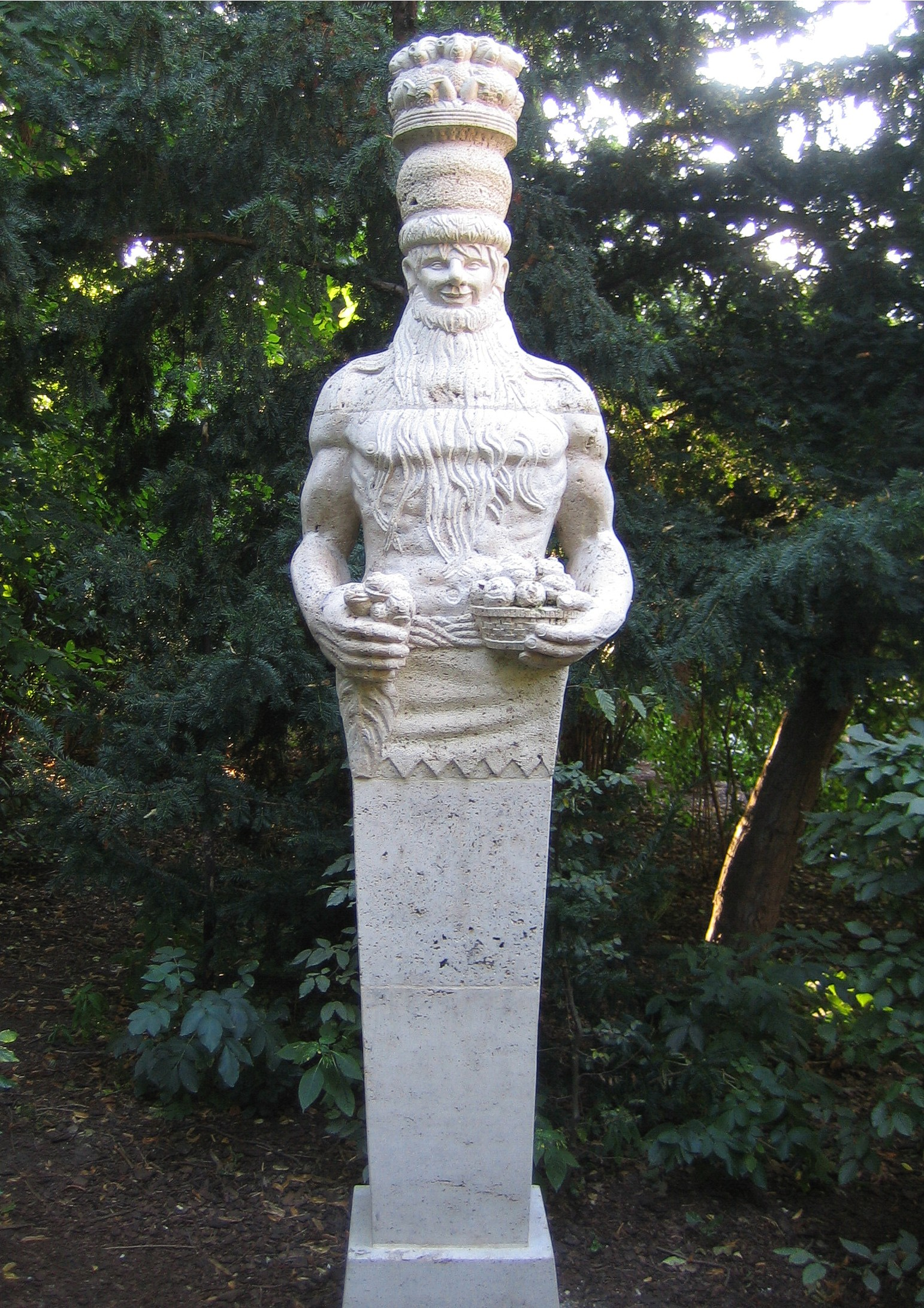
Herm near the Märchenbrunnen in the Volkspark Friedrichshain, Berlin

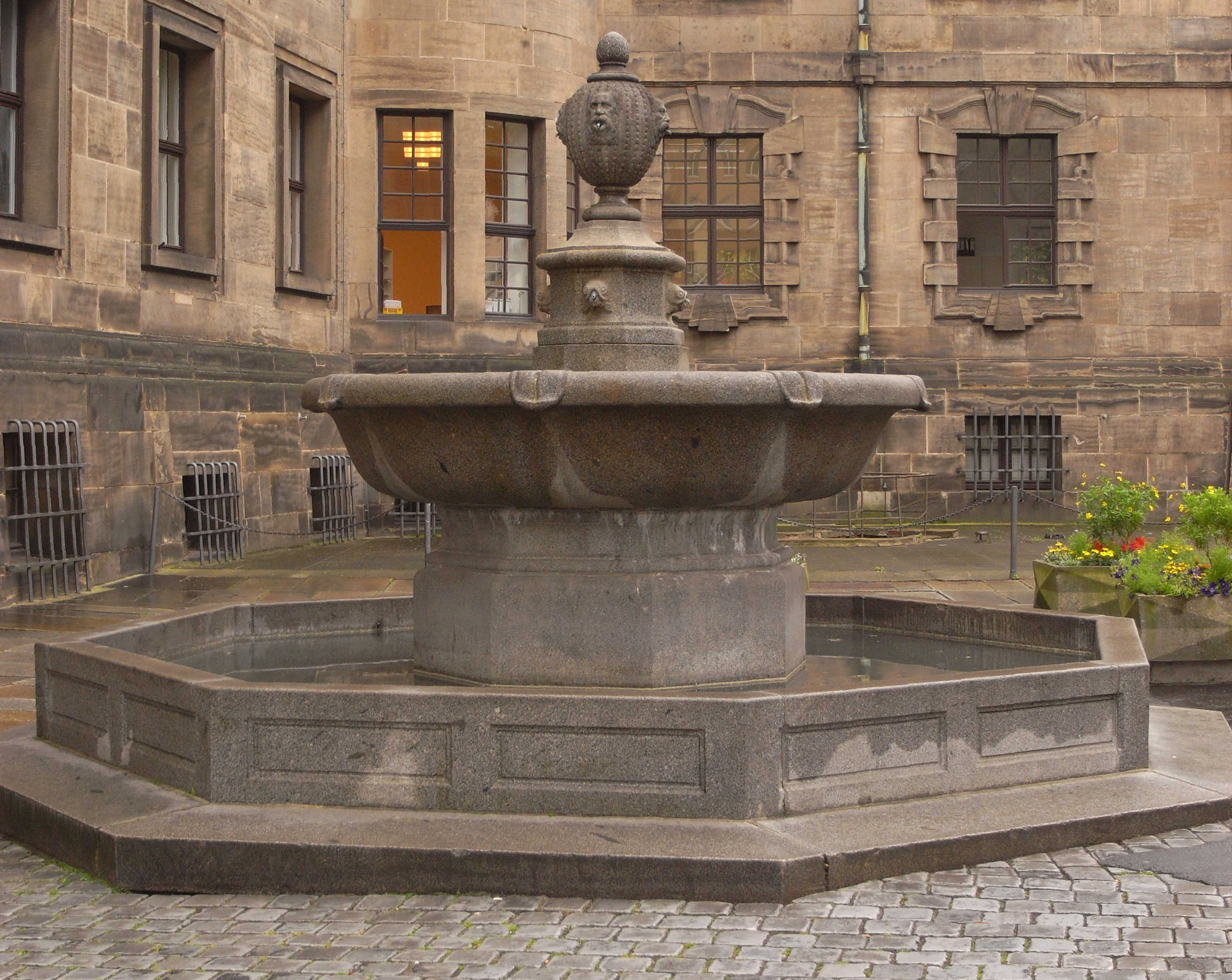
City Hall Fountain, Neues Rathaus, Dresden, 1911

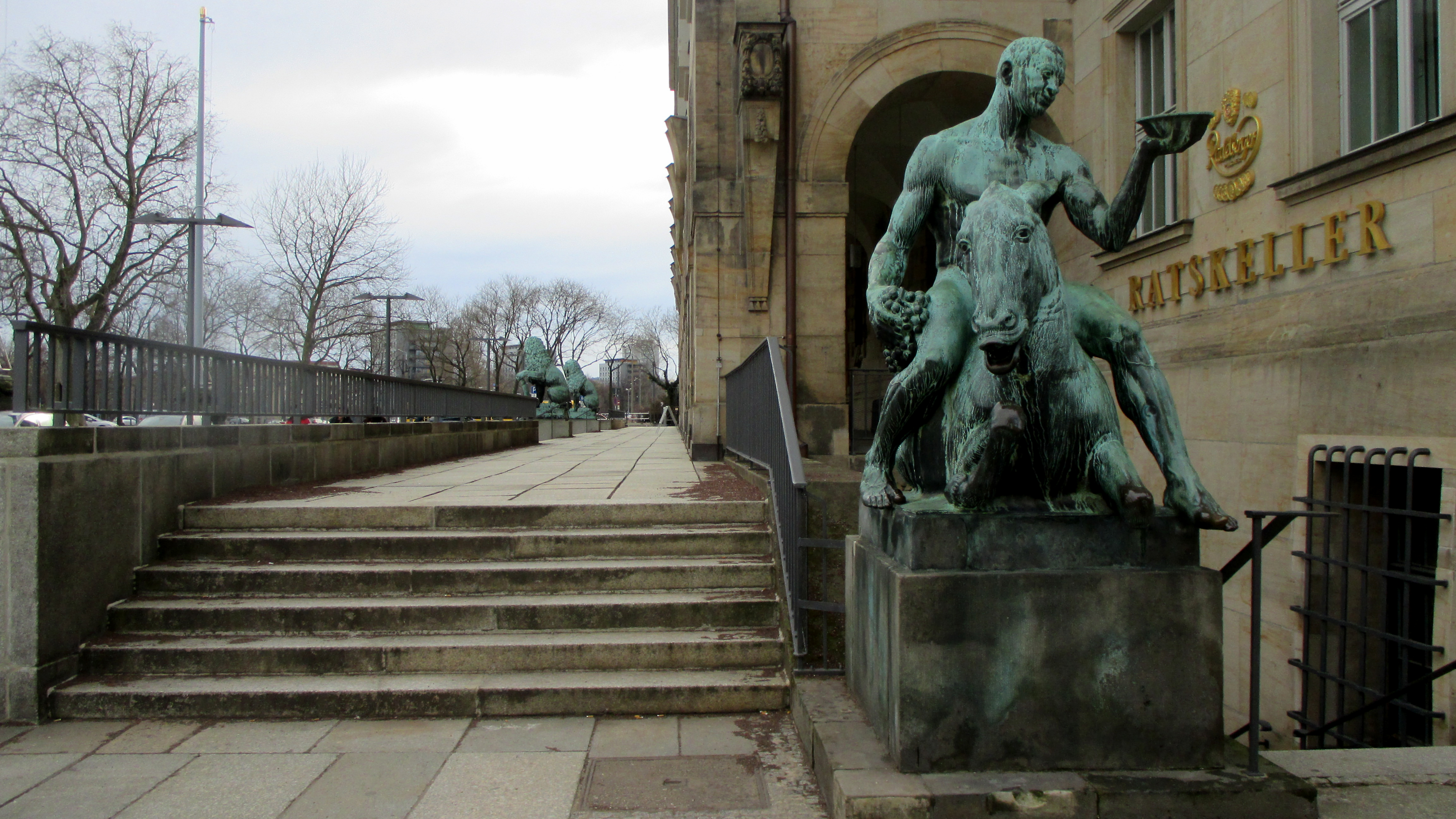
Dresden Neues Rathaus, 1910

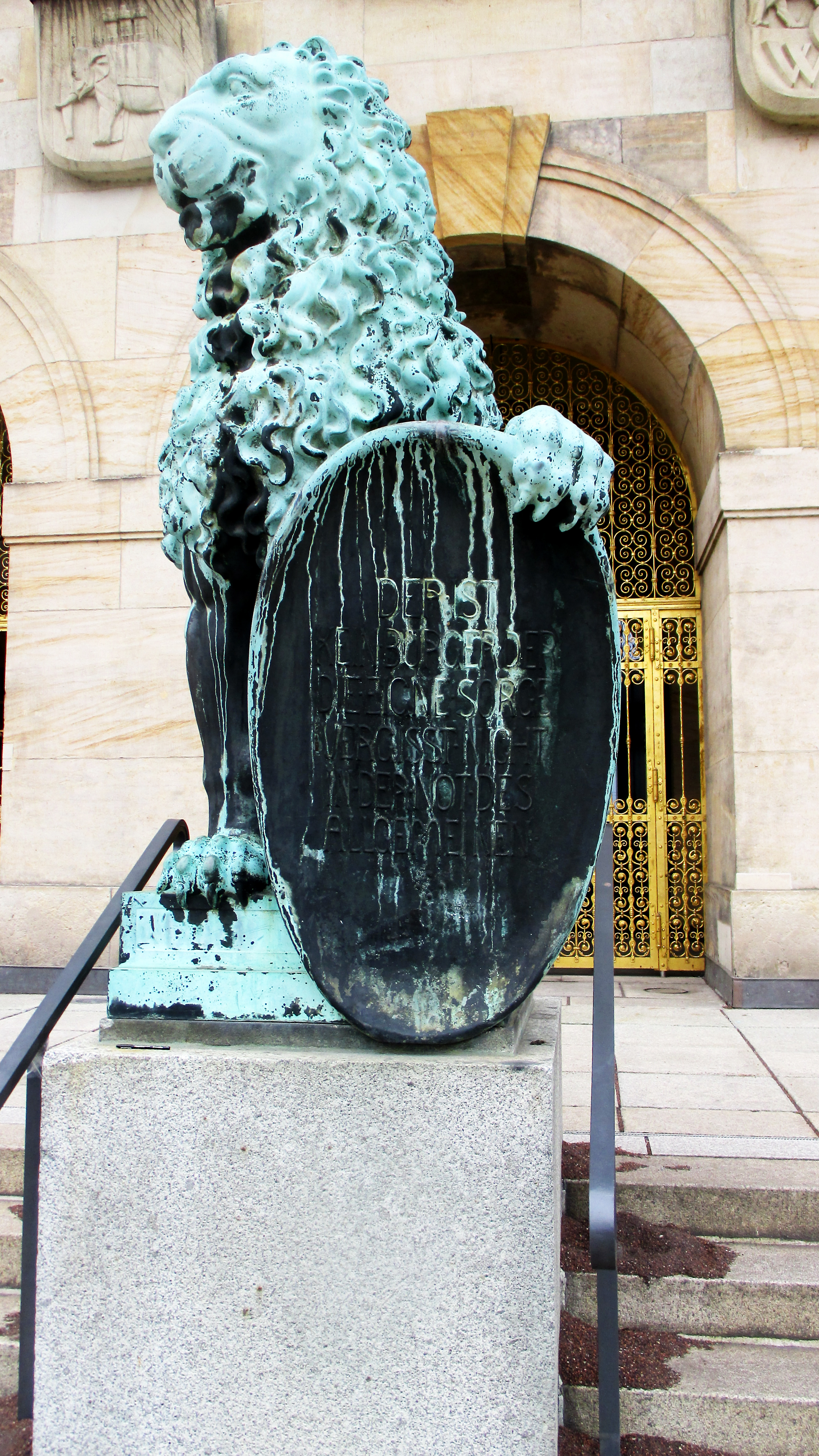
Dresden Neues Rathaus

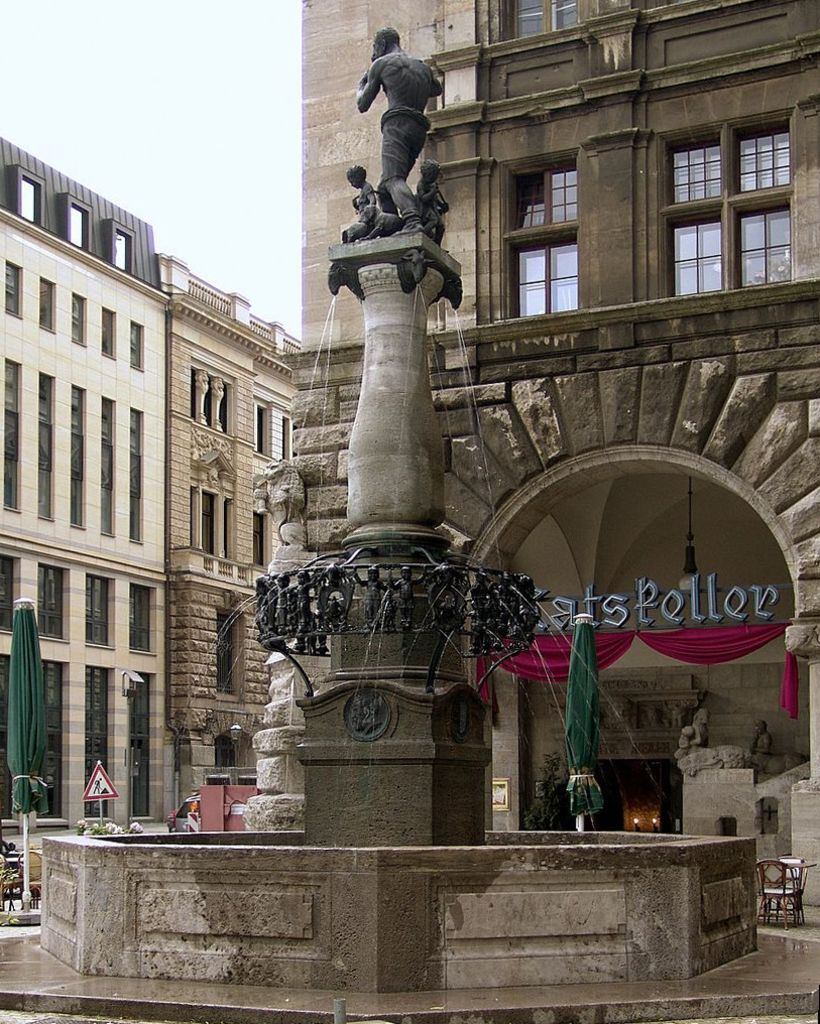
City Hall Fountain, Neues Rathaus, Burgplatz, Leipzig, 1908

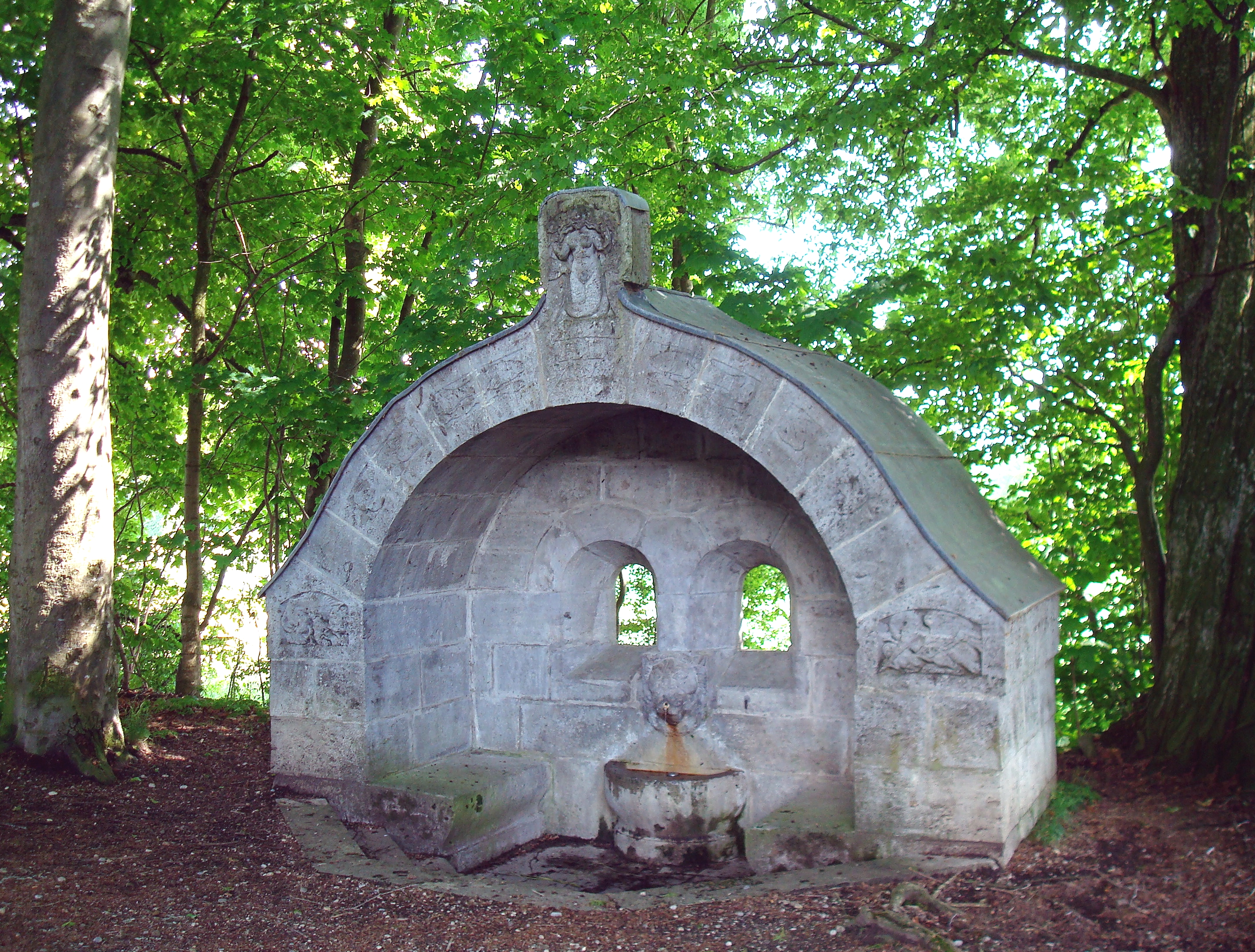
Fountain shelter, Bismarck Tower in Berg, Starnberger See, 1899

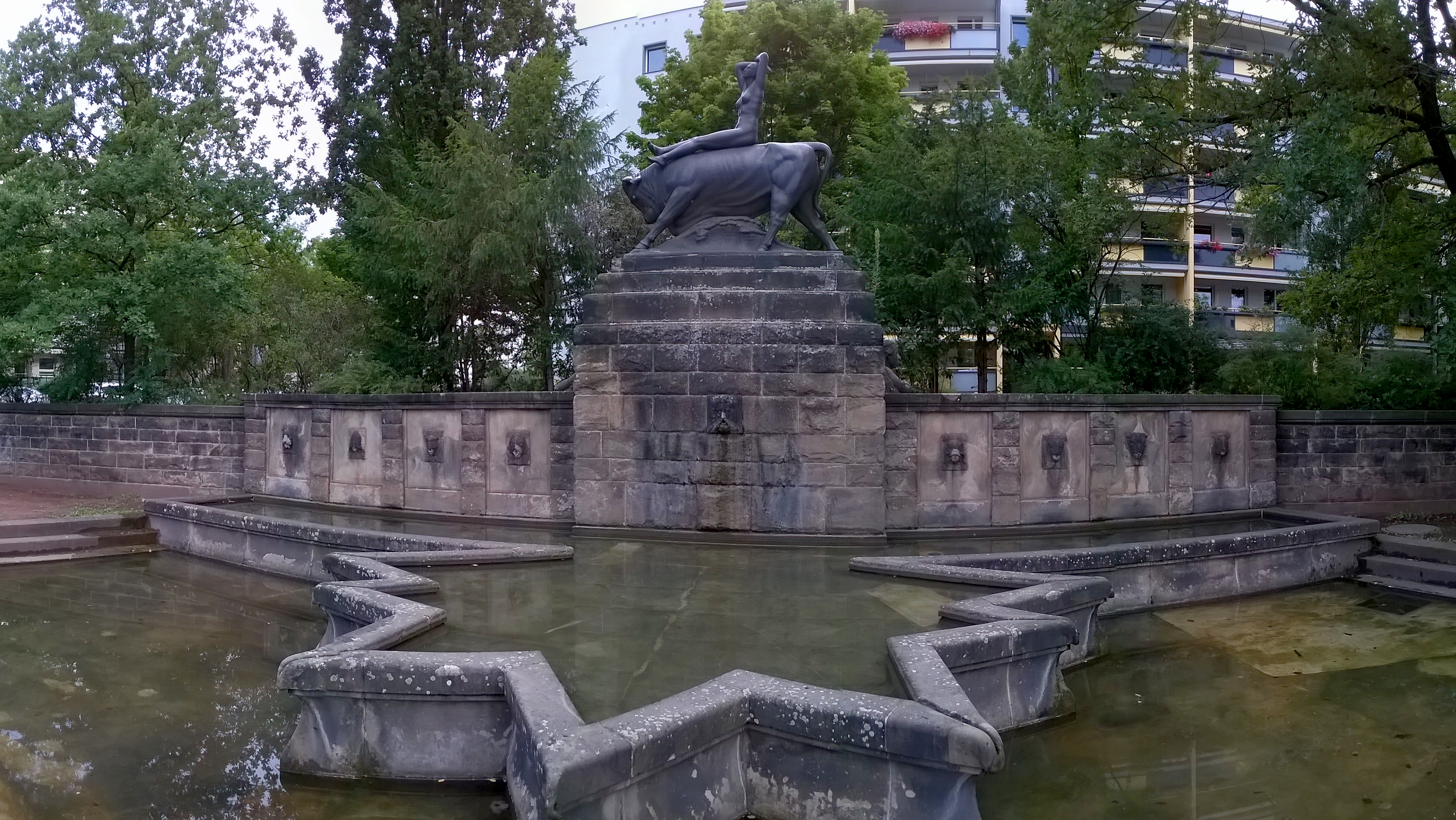
Europabrunnen - Dresden
