= Bridgegate =

Bridgegate may refer to:

- Bridgegate, Chester, part of the city walls of Chester, Cheshire, England
- Fort Lee lane closure scandal, a political scandal involving a staff member and political appointees of New Jersey Governor Chris Christie

== See also ==
- Drawbridge, a type of moveable bridge typically at the entrance to a castle or tower
- Gate bridge (disambiguation)
