= List of works by Fritz Schumacher =

Fritz Schumacher (November 4, 1869 – November 5, 1947) was a German architect and urban designer.

== List of works ==
- Damenkabine im Dampfer Elbe“ 1892
- Renovierung u. Innenausstattung von Schloß Prösel 1893
- Bayerisches Nationalmuseum München 1893
- Umbau eines Hauses am Gardasee 1893
- Künstlerhaus München 1893
- Umbau eines Palazzo 1894
- Gartenplastikentwürfe für Schloß Kronberg 1894
- Hotelbau 1894–95
- Entwurf einer Kirche 1894
- Wettbewerb Teichmann-Brunnen 1895
- Konzertsaal im Städtischen Kaufhaus 1895
- Grabumlegungen im Neubau der Johanniskirche 1895
- Villa Heinrich Siller 1896–97
- Rathaus Leipzig 1897–99
- Vorschlag zur Erhaltung der Matthäikirche Leipzig 1897
- Medaille 1897
- Entwurf für ein Bismarckdenkmal1897
- Villa Toelle 1897–98
- Villa Erbslöh 1897–98
- Wettbewerb Hochbahnhaltestelle Berlin 1898
- Grabmalentwürfe 1898
- Entwürfe für zwei Standuhren 1898
- „Architektur-Studien“ 1898
- Studien zu einem Krematorium 1899
- Studie zu einem Justizpalast um 1899
- Bühnenbild zu Fritz Schumacher,
- Phantasien in Auerbachs Keller“ 1899
- Plakat zu Phantasien in Auerbachs Keller“ 1899
- Plakat für Champagne-Reitverein, Maskenfest 1900
- Bühnenbild zu Johann Wolfgang von Goethe,
- Palaeophron und Neoterpe“ 1900–01
- Entwürfe für Exlibris 1900–01
- Buchausstattungen 1900–01
- Teppichentwürfe 1900–02
- Villa von Halle 1900
- Villa Klug 1900
- Landhaus Iken 1900
- Erweiterung eines Schlosses 1901
- Innenraumausstattung der eigenen Wohnung 1901
- Villa in Konstanz 1901–02
- Villen für Mitglieder de r Familie Weddigen 1902
- Skizze zu einem Brunnendenkmal 1902
- Entwurf zu einem Ludwig-Richter-Denkmal um 1902
- Grabmal um 1902
- Grabmal Langewiesche um 1902
- Grabmal Meissner um 1902
- Entwurf einer freireligiösen Kirche 1903
- Wettbewerb Rathaus Dresden 1903
- Villa Grübler 1903
- Umgestaltung des Hauptsaales der Städte-Ausstellung 1903
- Grabmal Scharff um 1903
- Entwurf eines Krematoriums 1903
- Entwurf zu einem Brunnen 1903
- Entwurf zu einem Goethe-Monumentalbrunnen 1903
- Vorschlag zur Aufstellung eines Bismarck-Denkmals 1903
- Umgestaltung des Hauptsaales der Kunstaussellung 1904
- Wahlurne 1904
- Umgestaltung des Theaterplatzes 1905
- Entwurf eines Damenzimmers 1905
- Innenausstattung der Villa Hirzel 1905
- Haus Bauer 1905
- Umbau des Landsitzes von Heyl 1905
- Zwei Denkmäler 1901–05
- Franzius-Denkmal 1905
- Grabmalentwürfe (ebenso Werke 65, 67, 77, 93) 1903–07
- Standuhr für das Leipziger Rathaus 1906
- Dritte Deutsche Kunstgewerbe-Ausstellung 1906
- Protestantischer Kirchenraum 1906
- Wohnzimmer im Sächsischen Haus1906
- Kindergrabmäler (W 65.3) 1906
- Grabmal 1906
- Ladenpavillon 1906
- Grabmal Louise Gushurst um 1906
- Grabmalentwurf 1906
- Kriegsgedächnismal 1906
- Grabmal Kuoni-Stoppany 1906
- Wettbewerb Stadthaus Bremen 1906
- Grabmal Klinkhardt 1906–07
- Grabmal Mohr 1906–07
- Grabmal Floh 1906–07
- Grabmal Fusbahn 1906–07
- Villa Sombart 1906–08
- Bebauungsplan Kronprinzenstraße 1907
- Grabmalentwurf 1907
- Grabmal Freidrich Assmann Um 1907
- Grabmal Weichardt um 1907
- Hochkreuz auf dem Friedhof Uerdingen um 1907
- Bühnenbild zu Shakespeares Hamlet“ 1907–09
- Villa Osthaus 1908
- Wettbewerb für eine Kirche 1908
- Wettbewerb für eine Kirche 1908
- Entwurf des Ausstellungsraumes der Zunft“ 1908
- Empfangszimmer 1908
- Gutachten für den Dürerbund 1908
- Speisesaal für die Hessische Landesausstellung 1908
- Handelshochschule Leipzig 1908
- Grabmal Friedrich Otto Schneider 1906–08
- Grabmal Wilhelm Grube um 1908
- Grabmal Franz Zimmermann um 1908
- Grabmal um1908
- Grabmal Helene Thierfelder um 1908
- Grabmal Bernhard Floss um 1908
- Grabmal Hüttel 1908
- Umbau Villa Schumacher 1908–09
- Krematorium Tolkewitz 1908–11
- Innengestaltung Villa Metrowsky 1909
- Grabmal Kluepfel 1906–09
- Grabmal Lauenpusch 1909
- Wettbewerb Heilandskirche 1909
- Bühnenbildentwürfe 1909
- Gasometer Fuhlsbüttel 1909
- Grabmal Böcking 1909
- Grabmal Marie Kunze um 1909
- Grabmal um1909
- Grabmal Ernst von Halle um 1909
- Grabmal Kenzler um 1909
- Grabmal Marcus um 1911
- Innenumgestaltung des St.-Petri Domes 1909–10
- Bebauungsplanung Groß-Borstel 1910–11
- Pfarrhaus und Kirchplatz St. Michaelis 1910–12
- Realgymnasium Hammer Steindamm 1910–13
- Technische Staatslehranstalten 1910–14
- Hilfsschule Birkenau 1911
- Entwurf eines Zollverwaltungsgebäudes 1914
- Entwurf zu einem Brückenpfeiler um 1911
- Polizeiwache Hammer Deich 1911–12
- Volksschule Lutterothstraße 1911–12
- Volksschule Rübenkamp 1911–12
- Volksschule Teutonenweg 1911–12
- Oberschulbehörde 1911–12
- Lehrerinnenseminar 1911–12
- Staatliche Kunstgewerbeschule Hamburg 1911–13
- Institut für Geburtshilfe 1911–14
- Hauptfeuerwache Berliner Tor 1911–15
- Erweiterung des Strafjustizgebäudes 1911–15
- Stadtpark Hamburg 1911–30
- Bebauungsplanung Kleinwohnungssiedlung Finkenwerder 1912
- Bebauungsplanung Farmsen-Berne 1912
- Entwurf für ein Kunstvereinsgebäude an der Außenalster 1912
- Bebauungsplanung Kleinhaussiedlung Farmsen-Berne 1912
- Neugestaltung des Platzes hinter der Kunsthalle 1912
- Grabmalentwürfe 1912
- Grabmal Rosen 1912
- Seglerheim mit Arbeiterspeisehalle um 1914
- Studien zur Reform des Kleinwohnungsbaus um 1912
- Irrenanstalt Friedrichsberg 1912–14
- Schwesternhaus Eppendorfer Krankenhaus 1912–14
- Tropeninstitut Hamburg 1912–14
- Gelehrtenschule Johanneum 1912–14
- Volksschule am Tieloh 1911–13
- Gewerbehaus Hamburg 1912–15
- Hauptrestaurant im Stadtpark 1912–16
- Pathologie Eppendorfer Krankenhaus 1912–16/ 26
- Feuerwache Petroleumhafen 1913
- Entwurf Grundbuchamt Alstertor 1913
- Hindenburgstraßenbrücke 1925
- Polizeiwache am Spielbudenplatz 1913–14
- Hansaschule Bergedorf 1913–14
- Volkslesehalle und Mönckebergbrunnen 1913–14
- Verwaltungsgebäude Dammtorwall 1913–15
- Grabmal Burchard 1913–15
- Alsterkanalisierung 1913–16
- Museum für Hamburgische Geschichte 1913–22
- Museum für Hamburgische Geschichte (Einbau historischer Bauteile) 1913–22
- Museum für Hamburgische Geschichte (Nicht ausgeführter Entwürfe) 1913–22
- Stadthauserweiterung 1914
- Polizeiwache Hoheluft 1914
- Sportzentrum am Wasserturm 1914
- Alsterdammbrücke 1914
- Bebauungsplanung Alsterdorf-Fuhlsbüttel 1914
- Umbau Wohnhaus Fritz Schumacher 1914
- Grabmal Lichtwark 1914
- Finanzdeputation Hamburg 1914 (1926)
- Stiftungsschule am Zeughausmarkt 1914–15
- Realschule Uferstraße 1914–15
- Leichenhalle Barmbek 1914–15
- Erweiterungsplanung Friedhof Ohlsdorf 1914–15
- Landhaus im Hamburger Stadtpark 1914–15
- |col2=
- Trinkhalle mit Sondergarten 1914–15
- Kaskade am Stadtparksee 1914–15
- Stadtparkcafé 1914–16
- Zwei Brücken am Stadtpark-Kanalhafen 1914–16
- Kleinkinderhaus Winterhude 1914–16
- Planschbecken mit Schutzhalle 1914–23
- Entwurf der Volksschule Großmannstraße 1915
- Bebauungsplanung Cuxhaven 1915
- Erweiterung des Hüttengefängnisses 1914
- Studie zu einem Kriegsgedächtnismal um 1915
- Volksschule Burgstraße 1915 (1921)
- Freibad Lattenkamp 1915 (1926)
- Studie zu einem Ehrenhof am Wasserturm 1916
- Studie Eckbebauung Ankelmannstraße 1916
- Schule Klein-Grasbrook 1916
- Kriegsgedächnismal 1916
- Seekriegsgedächtnismale 1916
- Spiel- und Kampfanlage als Kriegsgedächtnisstätte 1916
- Kriegsgedächnisdmal 1916
- Bedürfnisanstalt Paulinenplatz 1917
- Erweiterungsbau der Hamburger Kunsthalle 1917–19
- Bebauungsplanung Horn 1917–26
- Bebauungsplan Kleingartenkolonie Groß-Borstel 1918
- Bebauungsplanung Volksdorf-Wensenbalken 1918
- Grabmal Troplowitz-Mankiewcz 1918
- Bebauungsplan Kleinwohnungssiedlung Dulsberg 1918–19
- Grabmal Mollweide 1919
- Bedürfnisanstalt Stellinger Weg 1919
- Bedürfnisanstalt Alsterdorfer Damm 1919
- Wettbewerb zur Bebaung des Inneren Rayon Köln 1919
- Bühnenbildentwürfe für eine Monumentalbühne - Goethes Iphigenie auf Tauris um 1919
- Lichtwarkschule 1919 (1925)
- Volksschule Ahrensburger Straße 1919–20
- Lyzeum am Lübeckertorfeld 1919–20
- Kaufmännische Fortbildungsschule 1919–20
- Kleinhaussiedlung Langenhorn 1919–21
- Entwurf eines Pfarrhaus für St. Georg 1920
- Luft- und Sonnenbad im Hamburger Stadtpark 1920
- Grabanlage für die Opfer der Revolutionsjahre 1918–20 1920
- Denkmal für Wilhelm Cordes 1920
- Bühnenbild zu Shakespeares Macbeth“ 1920
- Studie zur Platzgestaltung am Dammtor um 1920
- Staatswohnungsbauten Dulsberg 1921–23
- Generalsiedlungsplan Köln 1920–23
- Volksschule Ratsmühlendamm 1919
- Wettbewerb Brückenkopf Deutzer Brücke 1922
- Bücherhalle am Museum für Kunst und Gewerbe 1923
- Ehrengrabstätte der Polizei 1923
- Entwurf einer Universitätsbibliothek 1924
- Bedürfnisanstalt am Goldbekplatz 1925
- Bebauungsplan Kleinwohnungssiedlung Veddel 1925
- Anlage des Heinrich-Heine-Denkmals 1925–26
- Heilwigbrücke 1925–26
- Bebauungsplan Hamm-Nord 1925–26
- Polizeiwache Oberalster 1925 –26
- Staatskrankenhaus Cuxhaven 1925–27
- Bedürfnisanstalt im Wehber`schen Park 1926
- Berufsschule Angerstraße 1926–27
- Hilfsschule Bundesstraße 1926–27
- Amtsgericht Bergedorf 1926–27
- Brücke Von-Essen-Straße 1926–27
- Flughallen A und B 1926–27
- Bebauungsplan Jarrestadt 1926–28
- Gefängnis Glasmoor 1926–28
- Projekt Naturhistorisches Museum 1910 u. 1926/ 28
- Bebauungsplanung des Lübeckertorfeldes 1926–29
- Gutachten zum Generalssiedlungsplan Bremen 1926–30
- Bedürfnisanstalt Klein-Borstel 1927
- Polizeiwache Geffkenstraße 1927
- Polizeihaus Springeltwiete 1927
- Eppendorfer Brücke 1927
- Kraftwagenhalle für die Stadtreinigung 1927
- Seeflughalle Travemünde 1927–28
- Friedhofskapelle XIII 1927–28
- Feuerwache Veddel 1927–28
- Krugkoppelbrücke 1927–28
- Fernsichtbrücke 1927–28
- Erweiterung des Untersuchungsgefängnisses 1927–28
- Volksschule Langenfort 1927–29
- Erweiterungsbauten für die Straßenreinigung 1927–29
- Gorch-Fockhalle 1927–29
- Erweiterungsbau Ziviljustizgebäude (Grundbuchhalle)1927–30
- Bellevuebrücke 1928–29
- Bedürfnisanstalt Hoheluft 1928
- Bedürfnisanstalt Steintorplatz 1928
- Bedürfnisanstalt am Klosterstern 1928
- Realschule Alstertal 1928
- Gewerbeschule Uferstraße 1928
- Tierkörper-Verwertungsanstalt um 1928
- Projekt zur Verlegung der Universität Hamburg 1928
- Entwurf für den Umbau der Großen Markthalle 1928
- Polizeiwache Alsterdorfer Straße 1928
- Höhere Realschule und Volksschule Volksdorf 1928–29
- Volksschule Adlerstraße 1928–29
- Volksschule Marienthaler Straße 1928–29
- Volksschule Wiesendamm 1928–29
- Volksschule Wendenstraße 1928–29
- Volksschule Veddel 1928–29
- Heringskühlhaus Grasbrookhafen 1928–29
- Entwurf Flughafengebäude Lübeck-Travemünde 1928–30
- Krematorium Ohlsdorf 1928–29
- Bedürfnisanstalt Billhorner Kanal 1929
- Bedürfnisanstalt und Beratungsstelle 1929
- Bedürfnisanstalt Süderstraße 1929
- Bedürfnisanstalt Osterbekstraße 1929
- Wohlfahrtsstelle II auf St. Pauli 1929
- Lyzeum Cuxhaven 1929
- Volksschule Hamm-Marsch 1929
- Bürogebäude für die Stadtreinigung 1929
- Mannschaftsgebäude für die Stadtreinigung 1929
- Entwurf für die Feuerwache Wandsbek 1929
- Schleidenbrücke 1929
- Studie zum Bebauungsplan Habichtplatz 1916 (29)
- Bebauungsplan Zoologischer Garten um 1929
- Volksschule Langenhorn 1929–30
- Volksschule Schaudinnsweg 1928–29
- Luisenschule Bergedorf 1929–30
- Volksschule Berne 1929–30
- Binderstraße 1929–30
- Volksschule Bauersberg 1929–30
- Polizeiwache Harzlohplatz 1929–30
- Volksschule Bogenstraße 1929–31
- Oberrealsschule für Mädchen Hamm 1929–31
- Altersheim Groß-Borstel 1929–31
- Volksschule Tiroler Straße 1930
- Bedürfnisanstalt Heubergredder 1930
- Feuerwache Rugenberger Hafen 1930
- Kaischuppen 59 1930
- Wiesendammbrücke 1927–28
- Bedürfnisanstalt und Warteraum Wilhelmsburger Platz 1931
- Polizeiwache Geesthacht 1931
- Volksschule Graudenzer Weg 1931–32
- Bedürfnisanstalt Winterhuder Marktplatz 1933
- Verlegung des Kaiser-Friedrich-Wilhelm-Denkmals 1933
- Bühnenbildentwürfe um 1933
- Grabmal Schumacher 1941
- Volksschule Rungestraße 1931
- Direktorenwohnhaus im Institut für Geburtenhilfe 1926–27
- Heimatkunde-Museum Bergedorf 1919–20
- Wohnhäuser Fuhlsbüttel 1920
- Höhere Mädchenschule Curschmannstraße um 1916
- Bebauungsplanung Wohldorf-Ohlstedt 1911
- Polizeiwache Rabenstraße 1926 (entfällt, vergl. W 332)
- Friedhofskapelle Finkenwerder 1926 –27
- Toranlagen Friedhof Finkenwerder 1927
- Bedürfnisanstalt Ohlsdorfer Friedhof 1927
- Bezirksdepot der Straßenreinigung 1928
- Wohnhaus auf dem Materialplatz Ohlsdorfer Friedhof 1920
- Jugendstrafanstalt Hahnöfersand 1926–29
- Pavillonschule Langenhorn 1919–20
- Erweiterung der Blumenmarkthalle 1926
- Erziehungsheim Wulfsdorf 1927–30
- Polizeiwache Alte Rabenstraße 1926
- Stadtgärtnerei Alsterdorferchaussee 1929
- Hörsaal der Säuglingsabteilung Eppendorfer Krankenhaus 1919
- Säuglingsabteilung Eppendorfer Krankenhaus 1919
- Erweiterungsbau für das Beleuchtungswesen ca. 1927
- Erweiterung des Botanischen Staatsinstituts 1913
- Planetarium im ehemaligen Wasserturm 1927–28
- Entwurf zum Neubau eines Planetariums 1925–27
- Umbau des Karstadt-Verwaltungsgebäudes 1927
- Müllverwertungsanlage Köln 1923
- Anbau Verwaltungsflügel Museum für Völkerkunde 1928
- Anbauten Hafenkrankenhaus 1925
- Erweiterung des Physikalischen Staatslabors 1913
- Pavillons auf dem Hamburger Rathausmarkt 1929–30
- Gestaltung der Deutschen Kriegsausstellung 1916
- Entwurf eines Ernst-Merck-Denkmal um 1916
- Beamtenwohnhäuser Glasmoor 1928
- Achsenmodell - Stadtentwicklungsplanungen für Hamburg um 1919
- Dritte Irrenanstalt Groß-Hansdorf 1915
- Kapelle in Worms ohne Datum
- Erweiterung der Anstalt für schulentlassene Mädchen 1913–14
- Erweiterung des Vorlesungsgebäudes Krankenhaus Eppendorf 1920
- Erweiterung der höheren Staatsschule in Cuxhaven 1929
- Blumenstraßenbrücke 1919
- Skagerrakbrücke 1919
