= Gate bridge =

Gate Bridge may refer to:

- The Golden Gate Bridge, a suspension bridge in San Francisco, United States
- The Hell Gate Bridge, a steel through arch bridge in New York City, United States
- The Lions' Gate Bridge, a suspension bridge in British Columbia, Canada
- The McKay-Carter Intergalactic Gate Bridge in the Stargate fictional universe
- The West Gate Bridge, a large cable-stayed box girder bridge in Melbourne, Victoria, Australia

== See also ==
- Sather Gate and Bridge, landmark in Berkeley, California, USA
- Charlottenburg Bridge and Gate, in Berlin, Germany
- Toll bridge, a type of bridge typically having toll gates
- Drawbridge, a type of bridge stereotypically employed as a gate
