= Charlottenburg =

- Quarter of Berlin
- Charlottenburg Palace

- Coat of arms

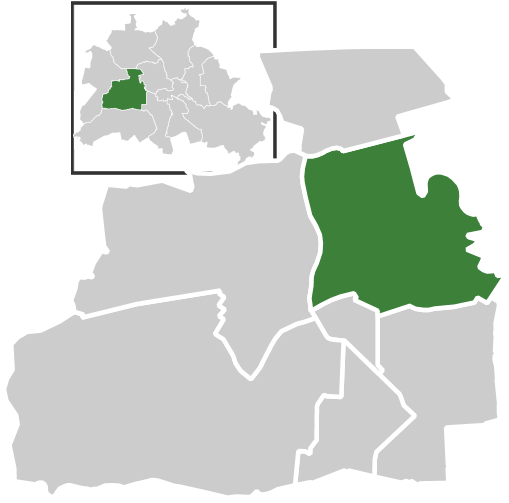
- Location of Charlottenburg in Charlottenburg-Wilmersdorf and Berlin
- Interactive map of Charlottenburg
- Location within Germany Location within Berlin
- Coordinates: 52°31′00″N 13°18′00″E
- Country: Germany
- State: Berlin
- City: Berlin
- Borough: Charlottenburg-Wilmersdorf
- Founded: 1705; 321 years ago

Area
  - Total: 10.6 km^{2} (4.1 sq mi)
- Elevation: 52 m (171 ft)

Population (2024-12-31)
  - Total: 130,564
  - Density: 12,300/km^{2} (31,900/sq mi)
- Time zone: UTC+01:00 (CET)
  - Summer (DST): UTC+02:00 (CEST)
- Postal codes: 10585, 10587, 10589, 10623, 10625, 10627, 10629, 14052, 14055, 14059
- Vehicle registration: B

Charlottenburg (German: [ʃaʁˈlɔtn̩bʊʁk]) is a locality of Berlin within the borough of Charlottenburg-Wilmersdorf. Established as a town in 1705 and named after Sophia Charlotte of Hanover, Queen consort of Prussia, it is best known for Charlottenburg Palace – the largest surviving such royal palace in Berlin – and the adjacent museums.

Charlottenburg was an independent city to the west of Berlin until 1920 when it was incorporated into "Groß-Berlin" (Greater Berlin) and transformed into a borough. In the course of Berlin's 2001 administrative reform it was merged with the former borough of Wilmersdorf becoming a part of a new borough called Charlottenburg-Wilmersdorf. Later, in 2004, the new borough's districts were rearranged, dividing the former borough of Charlottenburg into the localities of Charlottenburg proper, Westend and Charlottenburg-Nord.

== Geography ==
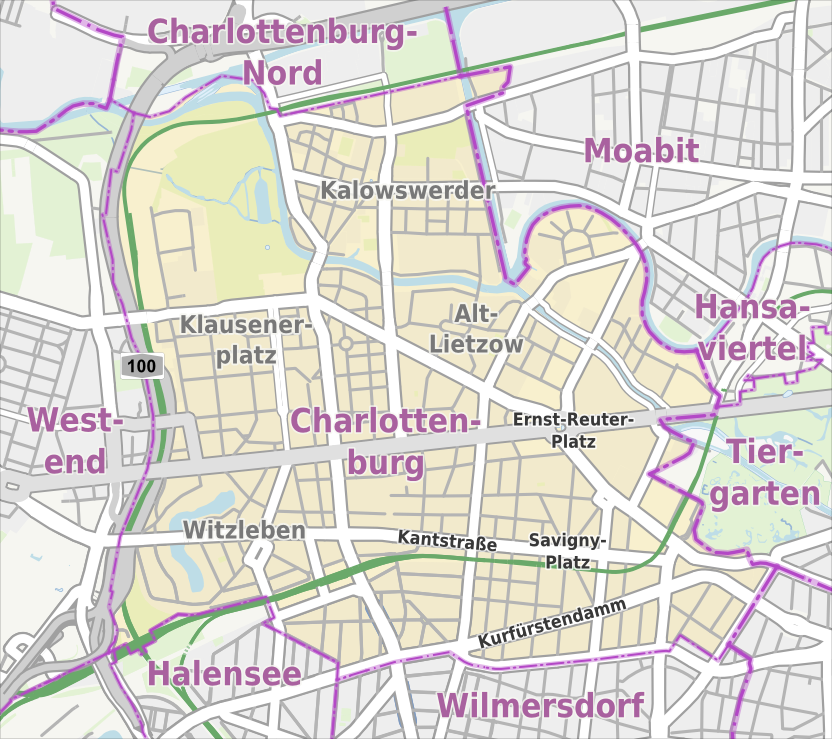
Charlottenburg neighbourhoods

Charlottenburg is in Berlin's inner city, west of the Großer Tiergarten park. Its historic core, the former village green of Alt Lietzow, is on the southern shore of the Spree River running through the Berlin glacial valley. The Straße des 17. Juni road, former Charlottenburger Chaussee, which runs eastwards from Charlottenburg Gate through the Tiergarten park to Brandenburg Gate, connects Charlottenburg with the historic centre of Berlin-Mitte.

In the north and west, the Berlin Ringbahn and the Bundesautobahn 100 (Stadtring) mark the border with the Charlottenburg-Nord and Westend suburbs. Adjacent in the south is the territory of Wilmersdorf. Charlottenburg also borders the district of Halensee in the southwest, as well as Moabit, Hansaviertel and Tiergarten (all part of the Mitte borough) in the east and Schöneberg in the southeast.

== Economy ==
Charlottenburg is considered a prestigious district and as of 2018 it was a sought after residential area. Its district Westend features a residential area 'New Westend' which has attracted people in the German entertainment industry.

== History ==
Archaeological findings in the area date back to the Neolithic era. Within the Margraviate of Brandenburg, on the land occupied by present-day Charlottenburg, there were three settlements in the late Middle Ages: the farmsteads Lietzow (pronounced leat-tsow) south of the Spree and Casow (pr. caasow) beyond the river, as well as a further settlement called Glienicke (pr. gleanicke). Although these names are of Slavic origin, the settlements are likely to have had a mixed Slavic and German population.

=== Lietzow ===
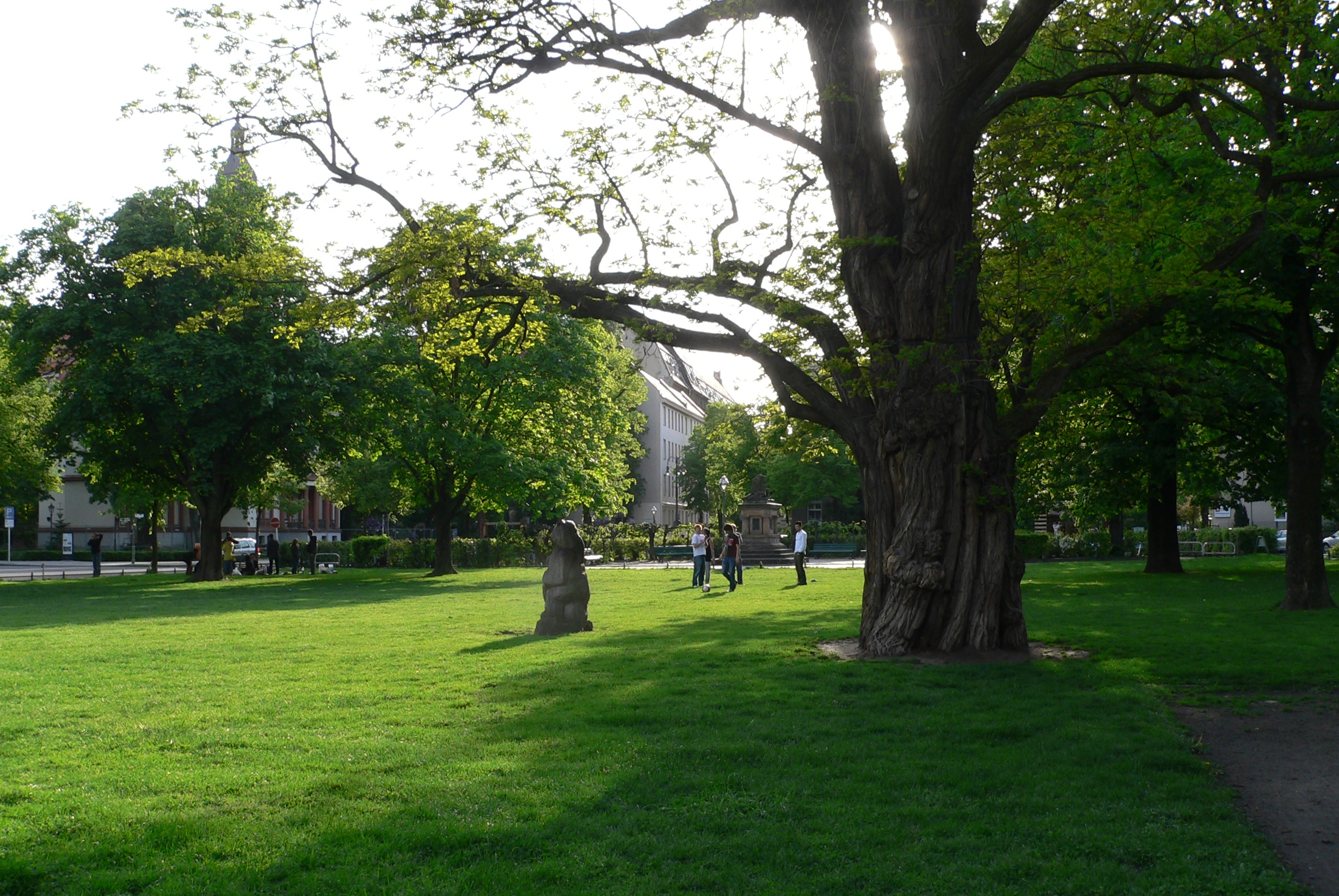
Alt-Lietzow village green

Lietzow (also called Lietze, Lutze, Lutzen, Lütze, Lützow, Lusze and Lucene) was first documented in 1239, when the Ascanian margraves John I and Otto III of Brandenburg founded the Benedictine Sankt Marien nunnery in nearby Spandau. The nuns were enfeoffed with the Lucene and Casow estates; while the Lietzow farmstead probably was expanded to a village by 1315, Casow was already mentioned as abandoned in the 1375 doomsday book of Emperor Charles IV. From old field names, it is believed that a third medieval settlement on Charlottenburg territory, Glienicke, arose in the area of the present day streets Kantstraße, Fasanenstraße, Kurfürstendamm and Uhlandstraße at the former Gliniker Lake.

Unlike Casow and Glienicke, the Lietzow area has been populated continuously and its development is well documented. In the course of the Protestant Reformation, Elector Joachim II Hector of Brandenburg confiscated the monastic estates in 1542 and finally had the nunnery dissolved in 1558. For more than four hundred years, members of the Berendt family were mayors and thus had to pay lower taxes. A village church was first documented in 1541. Ecclesiastically, Lietzow came under the Wilmersdorf parish, the priests reached it from there by the so-called Priesterweg (priest's way), on the line of the streets now called Leibnizstraße, Konstanzer Straße and Brandenburgische Straße.

=== Charlottenburg Palace ===
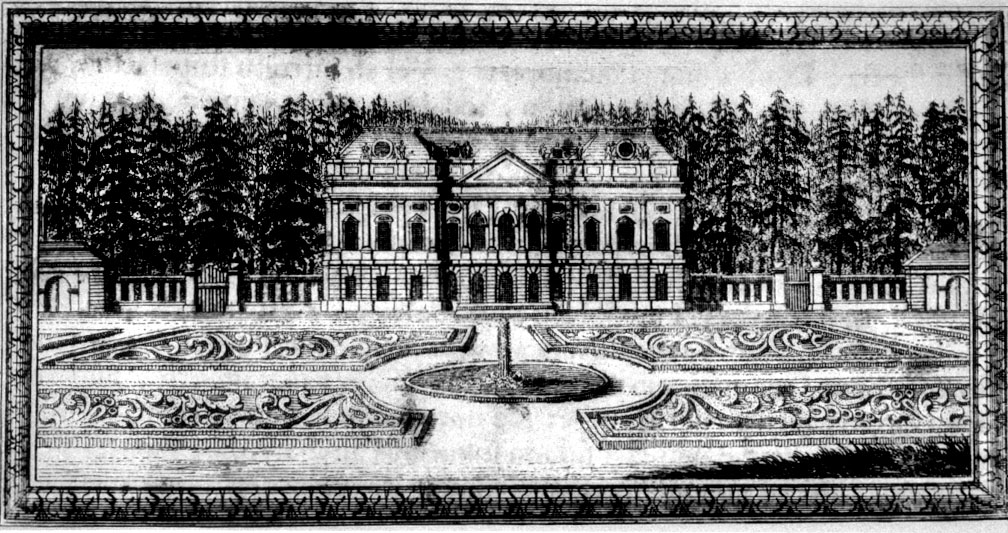
Lützenburg Castle, about 1700

In 1695, Sophia Charlotte of Hanover received Lietzow from her husband, Elector Frederick III of Brandenburg, in exchange for her estates in Caputh and Langerwisch near Potsdam. Frederick had a summer residence built there for Sophie Charlotte by the architect Johann Arnold Nering between 1695 and 1699. After he had crowned himself Frederick I, King in Prussia, the Lützenburg castle was extended into a stately building with a cour d'honneur. The Swedish master builder Johann Friedrich Eosander supervised this work. Sophie Charlotte died in February 1705; shortly afterwards the settlement facing the palace was called Charlottenburg - the palace itself became Schloss Charlottenburg - and chartered as a town on 5 April 1705. The king served as the town's mayor until the historic village of Lietzow was incorporated into Charlottenburg in 1720.

Frederick's successor as king, Frederick William I of Prussia, rarely stayed at the palace, which depressed the small town of Charlottenburg. Frederick William even tried to revoke the town's privileges. With the coronation of his successor Frederick II in 1740 the town's significance increased, as regular celebrations again took place at the palace. Between 1740 and 1747 Georg Wenzeslaus von Knobelsdorff built the eastern New Wing as Frederick's residence. Later, Frederick II preferred the palace of Sanssouci, which he had partly designed himself.

When Frederick II died in 1786, his nephew Frederick William II succeeded him, and Charlottenburg became the favourite royal residence, and remained so for his son and successor Frederick William III (reigned 1797–1840). After the defeat of the Prussian army at Jena in 1806, the French occupied Berlin. Napoleon took over the palace, while his troops made a camp nearby. Charlottenburg became part of the new Prussian Province of Brandenburg in 1815 after the Napoleonic Wars.

=== Recreational and residential area ===
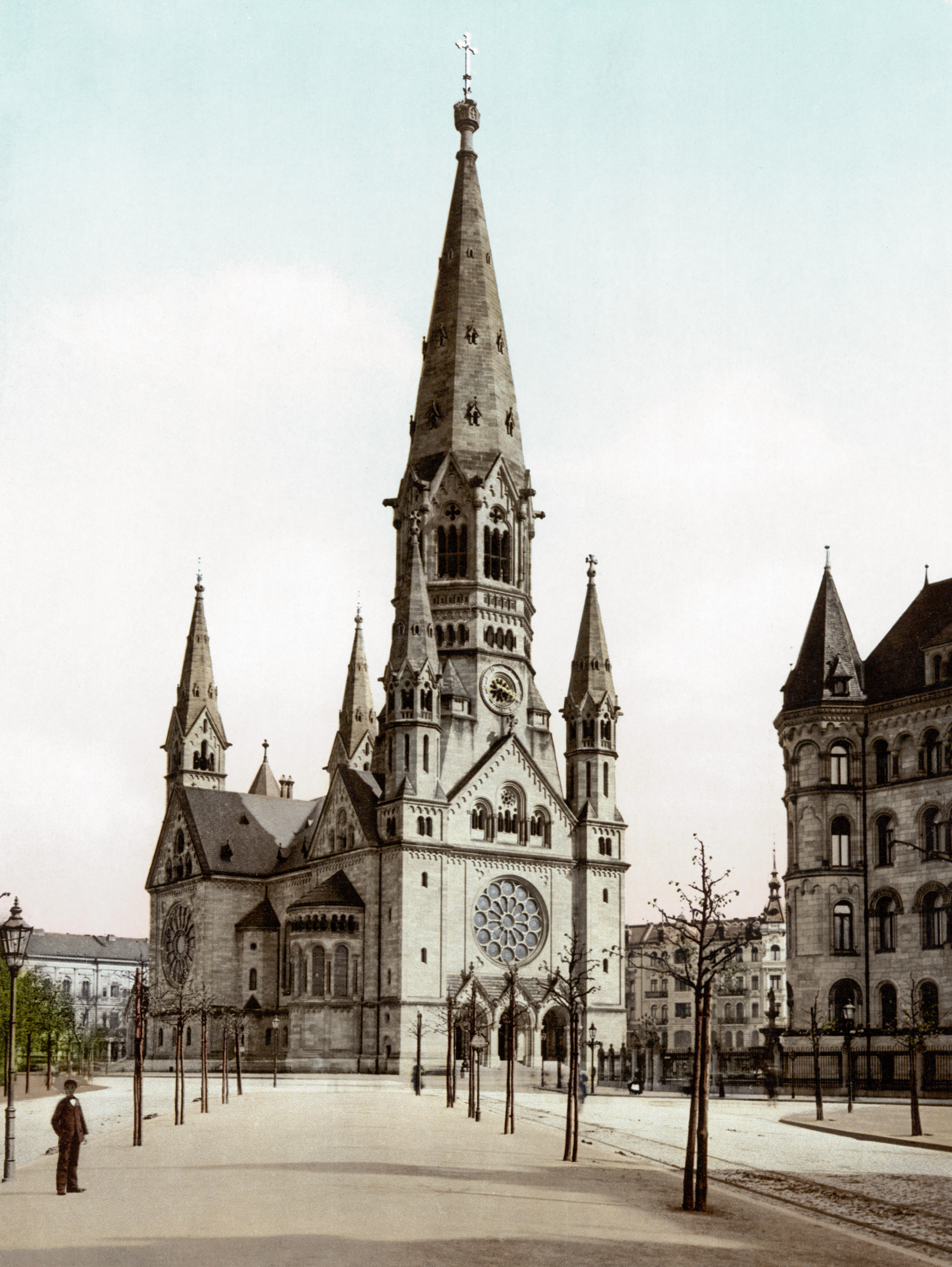
Kaiser Wilhelm Memorial Church, about 1900

In the late 18th century, Charlottenburg's development did not depend only on the crown. The town became a recreational area for the expanding city of Berlin. Its first true inn opened in the 1770s, in the street then called Berliner Straße (now Otto-Suhr-Allee), and many other inns and beer gardens were to follow, popular for weekend parties especially. Berliners seeking leisure and entertainment came by boat, by carriage and later by horse-drawn trams, above all to a large amusement park at the shore of the Spree river called Flora, that went into bankruptcy in 1904.

From the 1860s on, Berlin's wealthy bourgeoisie discovered Charlottenburg as a residential area. Among the first were Gerson von Bleichröder and Ernst Werner von Siemens, who built a villa in the Berliner Straße in 1862. At the same time industrial companies like Siemens & Halske and Schering erected large factories in the north-east, at the border with the Moabit district. In 1877, Charlottenburg received town privileges and until World War I saw an enormous increase of population, with 100,000 inhabitants as of 1893 and 306,000 in 1920, becoming the second-largest city in the Province of Brandenburg, after Berlin. In the course of industrialization in the 19th century, much of Charlottenburg was incorporated in a network of streets laid out in the Hobrecht-Plan in an area that came to be known architecturally as the Wilhelmine Ring.

The development was accompanied by an urban planning of broad streets and sidewalks, parks and spacious residential buildings, especially around the southern Kurfürstendamm area, which enabled large parts of Charlottenburg to preserve their affluent residential character. "The richest town of Prussia" established a Technische Hochschule, the Königlich Technische Hochschule zu Berlin in 1879 (which later became the Technische Universität Berlin), followed by the Physikalisch-Technische Reichsanstalt and the College of the Fine Arts. A new town hall with an 88 m (289 ft) tall spire was erected on the occasion of its 200-year jubilee in 1905 and an opera house opened in 1912. The history of Charlottenburg as a municipality in its own right ended with the Greater Berlin Act of 1 October 1920, when the town became a part of Berlin. The Province of Brandenburg was administered in Charlottenburg from 1918 until the province's dissolution in 1946 after World War II.

Talaat Pasha, the former Ottoman Empire Minister of the Interior, one of the Three Pashas, and architect of the Armenian genocide, was assassinated by Soghomon Tehlirian in Charlottenburg on 15 March 1921.

=== Borough of Berlin ===
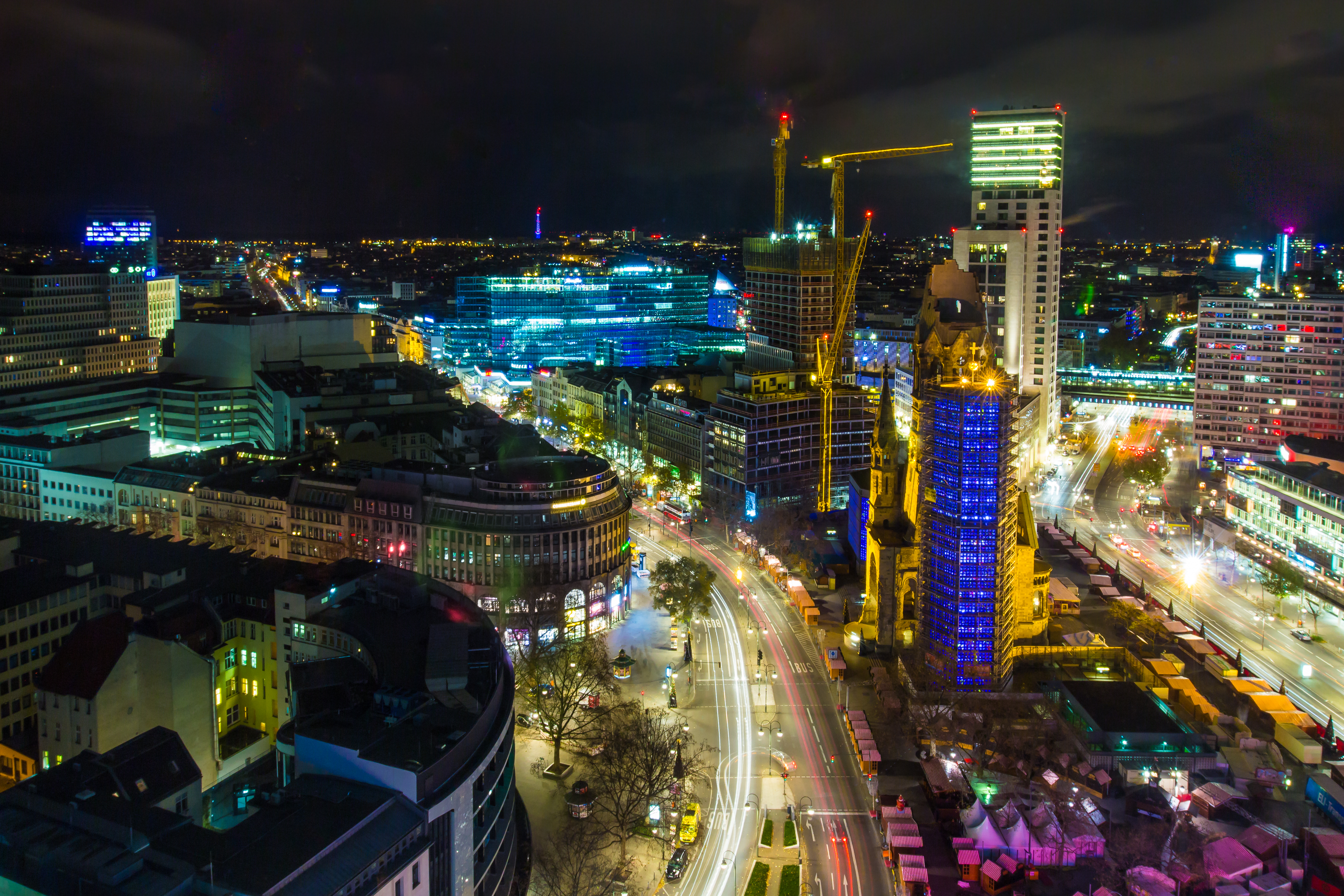
November 2015 view from Europa-Center over the City West

In the 1920s the area around the Kurfürstendamm evolved into the "New West" of Berlin, a development that had already started around 1900 with the opening of the Theater des Westens, the Café des Westens and the Kaufhaus des Westens, followed by several theatres, cinemas, bars and restaurants, which made Charlottenburg the Berlin centre of leisure and nightlife. Artists like Alfred Döblin, Otto Dix, Gottfried Benn, Else Lasker-Schüler, Bertolt Brecht, Max Liebermann, Stefan Zweig and Friedrich Hollaender socialized in the legendary Romanisches Café at the Kaiser Wilhelm Memorial Church. The Golden Twenties came to an end with the rise of the Nazi Party. In World War II the area around the Breitscheidplatz was heavily damaged by air raids and the Battle of Berlin.

After 1945 the city was partitioned by the allies and Charlottenburg became part of the British sector during the Cold War. The Kurfürstendamm area regained importance as the commercial centre of West-Berlin. It was therefore the site of protests and major demonstrations of the late 1960s German student movement that culminated on 2 June 1967, when student Benno Ohnesorg was shot by a police officer during a demonstration against Mohammad Reza Shah Pahlavi at the Deutsche Oper.

Before Berlin reunified, Charlottenburg was the centre of West Berlin, with many high market bars and restaurants. After reunification, Charlottenburg struggled with the rise of the Mitte borough as Berlin's historic centre. The City West is still the main shopping area, offering several major hotels, theatres, bars and restaurants.

The area around Charlottenburg's Kantstrasse is Berlin's Chinatown in the West, with a high concentration of Asian shops, gastronomy and inhabitants. It is commonly dubbed Kantonstrasse, in reference to the Chinese province of Guangdong.

== Sights ==
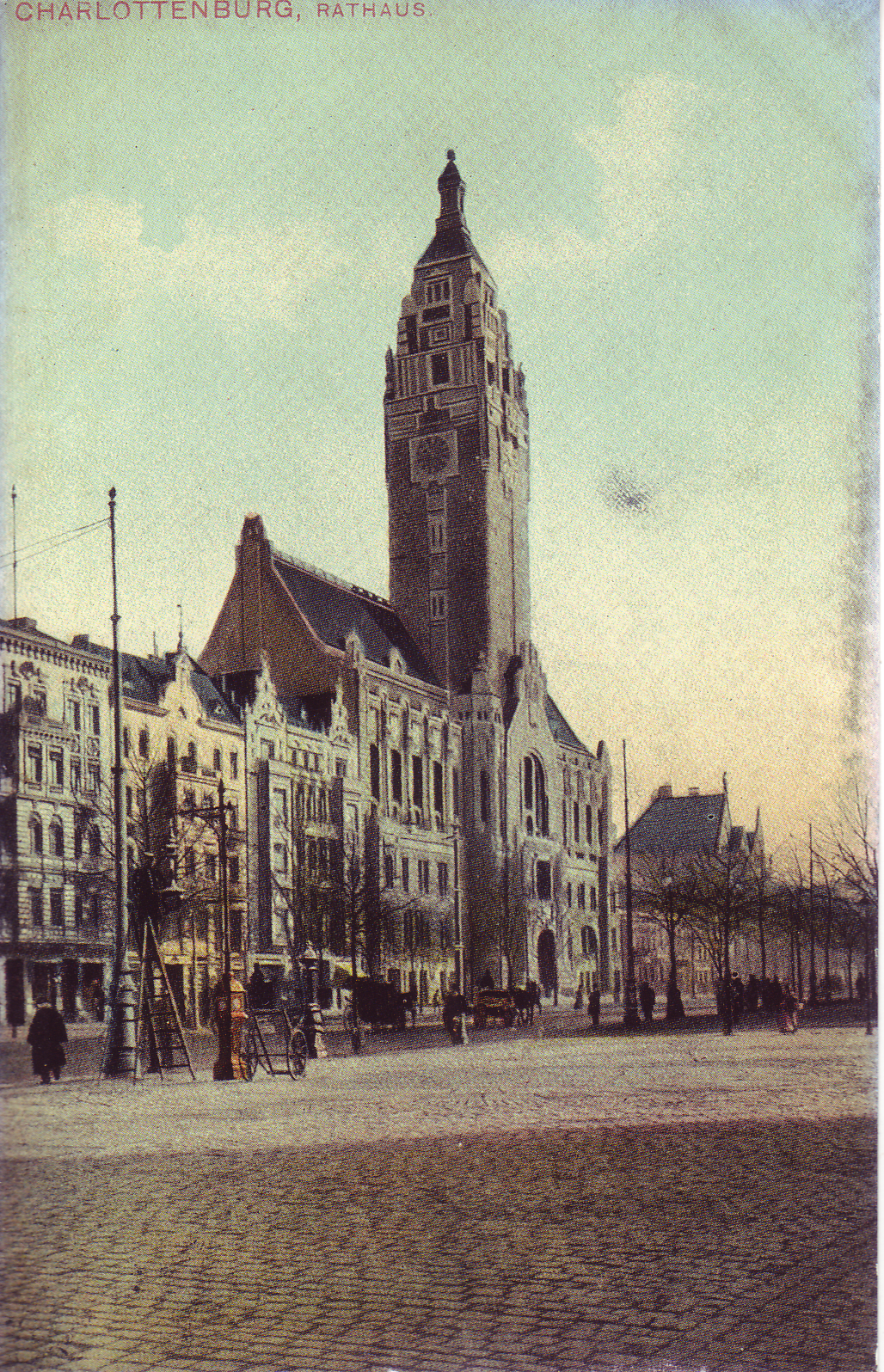
Town hall, about 1905

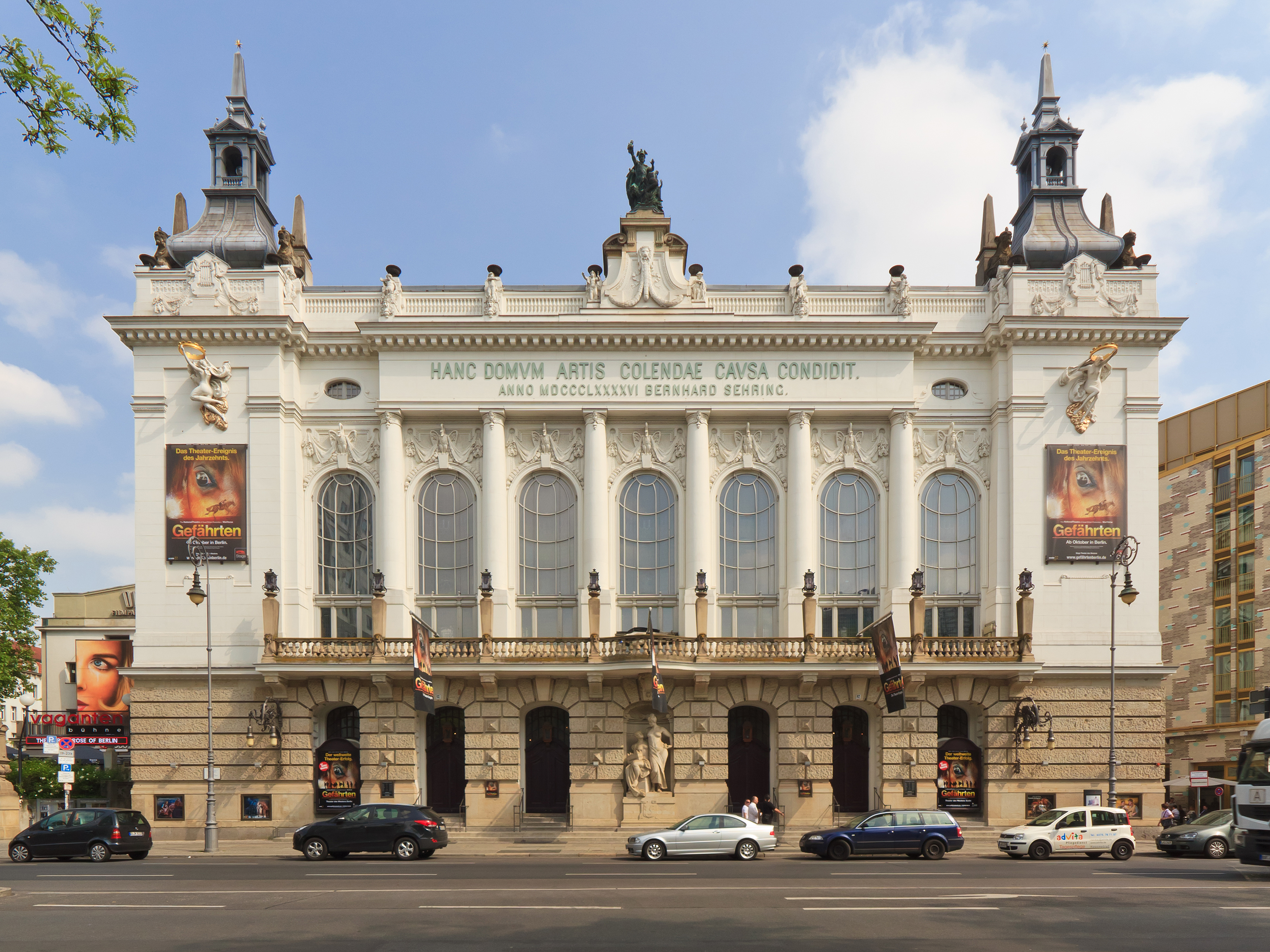
Theater des Westens

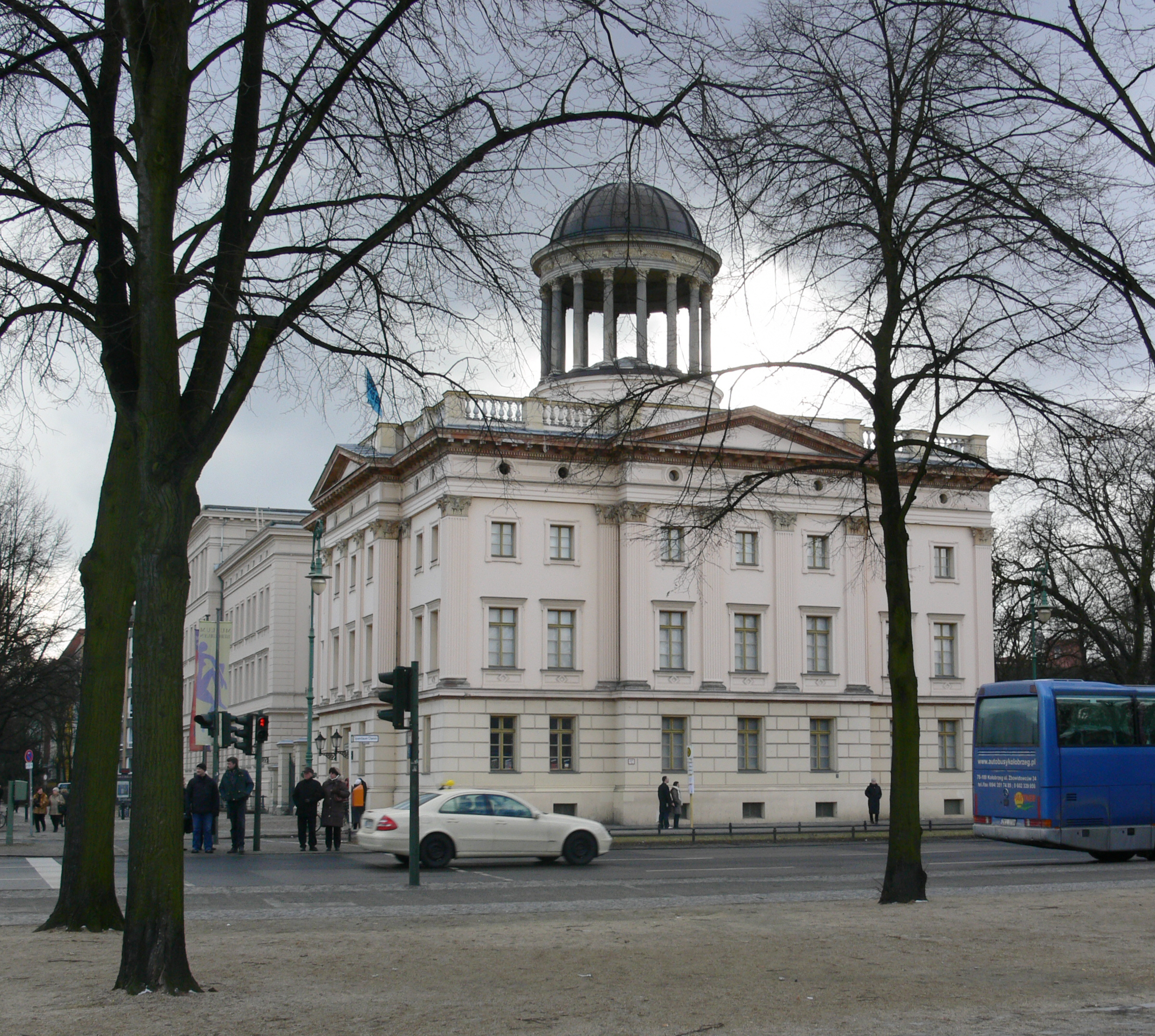
Museum Berggruen

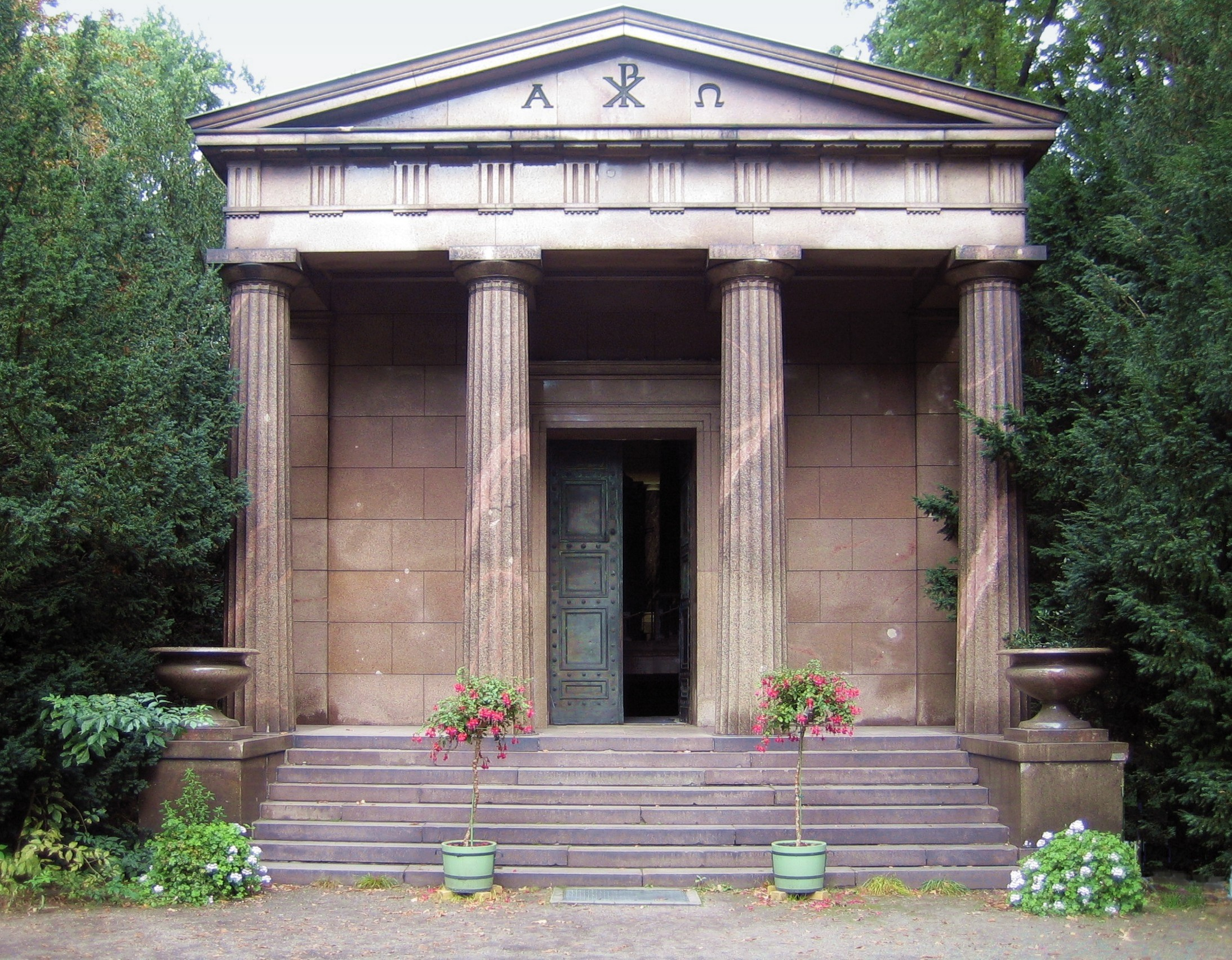
Royal Mausoleum

=== Overview ===
Beside the palace, Charlottenburg is also home to:

- ESCP Business School
- the old and new Kaiser Wilhelm Memorial Church on the Breitscheidplatz, built in 1895 by Franz Schwechten and in 1961 by Egon Eiermann, the former West Berlin landmark
- the Europa-Center, Berlin's first shopping mall opened in 1965
- Bahnhof Zoo, the main railway station in Berlin until the opening of Berlin Hauptbahnhof in 2006
- Bikini-Berlin, building complex with the Bikini-Haus shopping mall, the Zoo Palast cinema, and the Kaiser Wilhelm Memorial Church. Opened in 2014.
- the adjacent Berlin Zoological Garden, opened in 1844, officially located on the territory of the neighbouring Tiergarten locality
- Kurfürstendamm avenue, first laid out about 1542, today together with the Tauentzienstraße Berlin's main shopping area
- Technische Universität Berlin with about 27,000 students, founded in 1879
- Berlin University of the Arts with about 4,500 students
- Charlottenburg Town Hall, built in 1905
- Charlottenburg Gate
- Luisenkirche on Gierkeplatz, built in 1823 by Karl Friedrich Schinkel
- the Amerika Haus on Hardenbergstraße, built in 1957 by the United States Information Agency
- the Malteser-Hilfsdienst (Order of Malta) building at Alt-Lietzow str. 33
- the Literaturhaus on Fasanenstraße and the nearby Institute for Media and Communication Policy
- SRH Hochschule Berlin

=== Theatres ===
- Deutsche Oper Berlin on Bismarckstraße, opened in 1912, one of the three Berlin opera houses with relief in memory of Benno Ohnesorg by Alfred Hrdlicka, 1971 (installed in 1990)
- Theater des Westens musical theatre at Kantstraße, built in 1896
- Renaissance-Theater on Hardenbergstraße, 1902, rebuilt in Art deco design by Oskar Kaufmann in 1927
- Schiller Theater, built by Max Littmann in 1906
- Theater am Kurfürstendamm, 1921

=== Museums ===
- Museum Berggruen for classic modern art
- Museum Scharf-Gerstenberg for surrealist art

both in the former Gardes du Corps barracks at Charlottenburg Palace, built by Friedrich August Stüler 1859

- Museum für Vor- und Frühgeschichte (Museum for Pre- and Early History)
- Museum of Photography and Helmut Newton Foundation, next to Bahnhof Zoo
- Bröhan Museum for Art Nouveau and Art Deco
- Literaturhaus Berlin
- Käthe Kollwitz Museum on Fasanenstraße
- Gipsformerei (Replica workshop) of the Berlin State Museums
- Beate Uhse Erotic Museum (closed in September 2014 and searching for new premises)
