= Charlottenburg Gate =

Structure in Berlin, Germany

Coordinates: 52°30′48″N 13°19′53″E

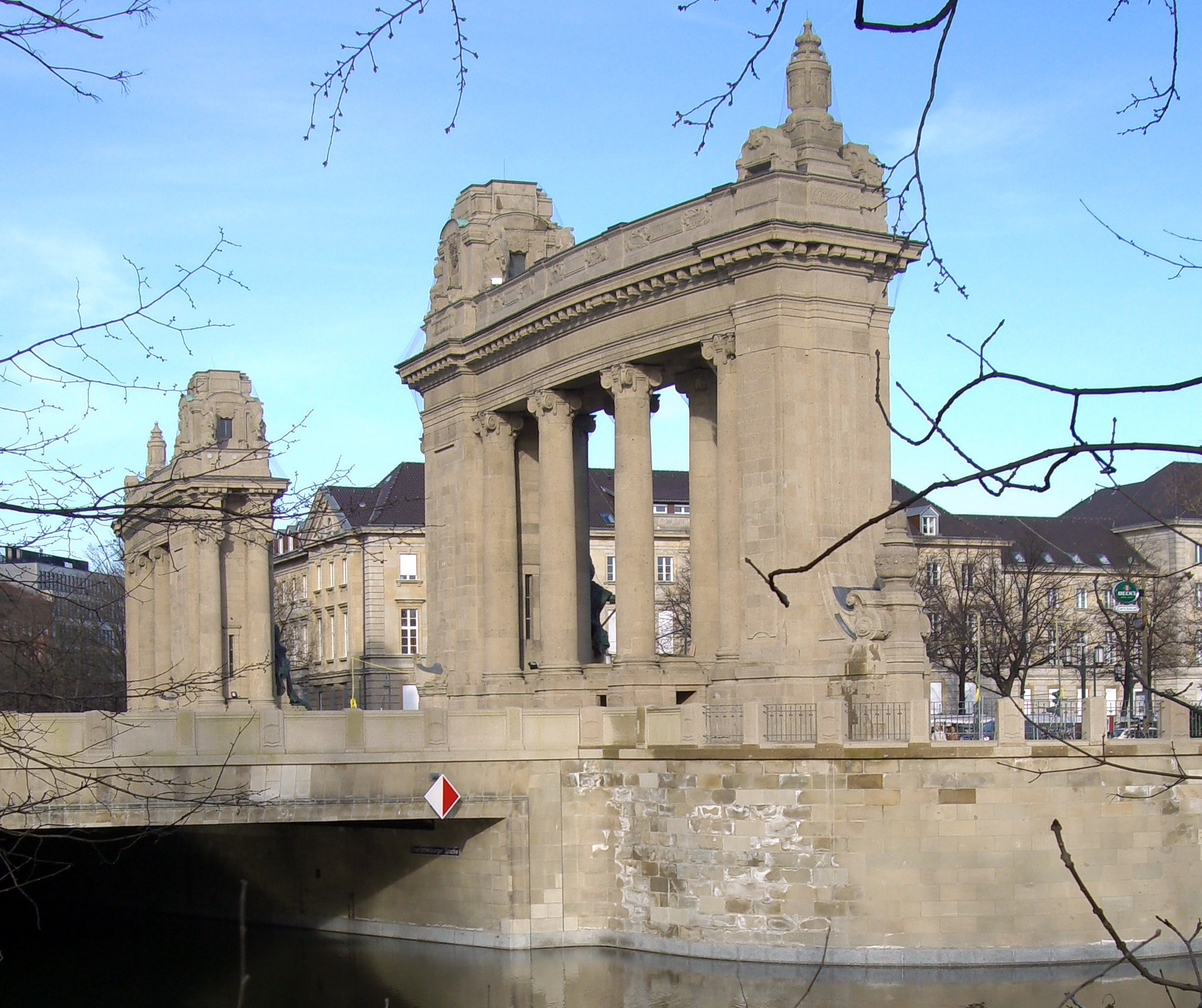
Porticoes of Charlottenburg Gate, view from south over Landwehr Canal

Charlottenburg Gate (German: Charlottenburger Tor) with Charlottenburg Bridge (Charlottenburger Brücke) is a Neo-Baroque structure in the Charlottenburg district of Berlin. Erected in 1907 at the behest of the then independent City of Charlottenburg, it was meant as a counterpart to Berlin's Brandenburg Gate.

== Location ==
The Gates flank the western approach to the main thoroughfare Straße des 17. Juni (former Charlottenburger Chaussee) through the Großer Tiergarten park, which passes either sided of the Berlin Victory Column in the centre, on through Brandenburg Gate to the central Mitte district, where it continues as the Unter Den Linden boulevard.

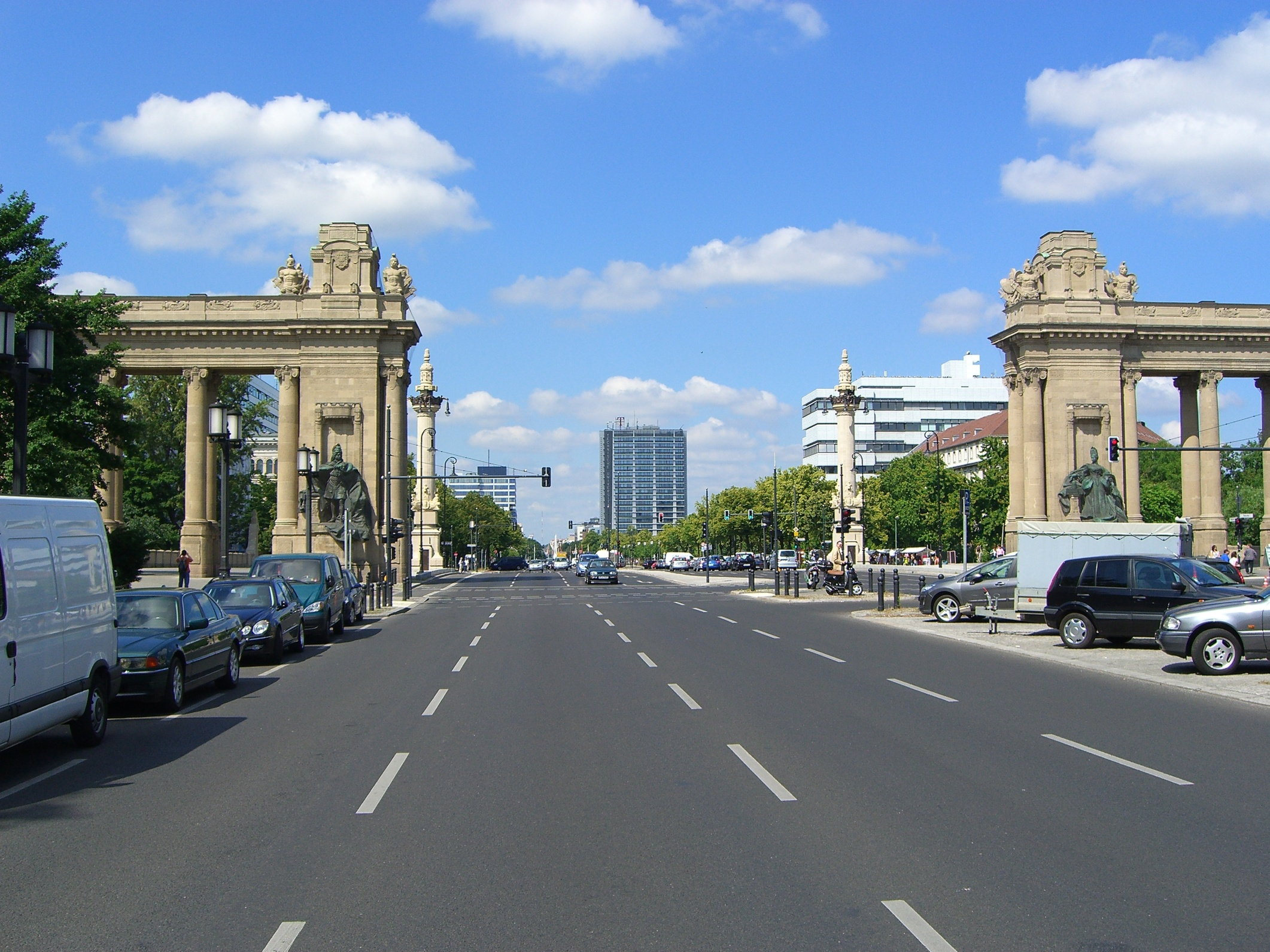
Porticoes and candelabra on Straße des 17. Juni, view to the west

They are close to the eastern border of the Charlottenburg locality, immediately to the west of the Tiergarten district. The Gate porticoes stand either side of the Strasse des 17. Juni to the east of the Charlottenburg Bridge, which spans the Landwehr Canal. To the west of the Bridge are two lavish street lights known as Candelabra in an Egyptian Revival style (German: Kandelaber).

== History ==
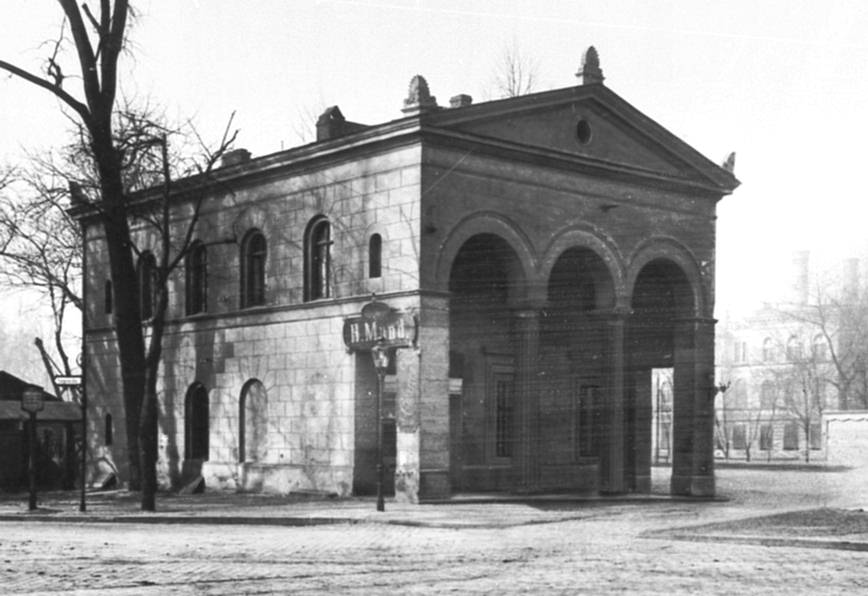
Southern custom house, about 1900

A first wooden bridge on the road from Berlin to Charlottenburg was erected in the course of the building of the Landwehr Canal according to plans designed by Peter Joseph Lenné from 1845 to 1850. It was not one of the original gates from the Berlin Customs Wall that existed between 1737 and 1860, and the earlier Berlin Fortress that existed between 1650 and 1740. To collect tolls and octrois, the Prussian treasury had two symmetric custom houses built on each side of the road in 1856, designed by Friedrich August Stüler in a Neoclassical style with Doric porticoes and sandstone columns. After the road tolls had been abolished in the late 19th century, the houses were rented, but began to block the increasing road traffic. In 1900, the bridge was purchased by the affluent City of Charlottenburg in order to rebuild it as a prestigious eastern entrance. The city council initiated an architectural design competition, though with no satisfactory result. The winner, Friedrich Pützer from Darmstadt, designed a stately gate house, which has never been built. The present-day gate complex was finally erected according to plans designed by Charlottenburg's building authority itself together with the commissioned architect Bernhard Schaede, for a price of 1,572,000 German gold marks.

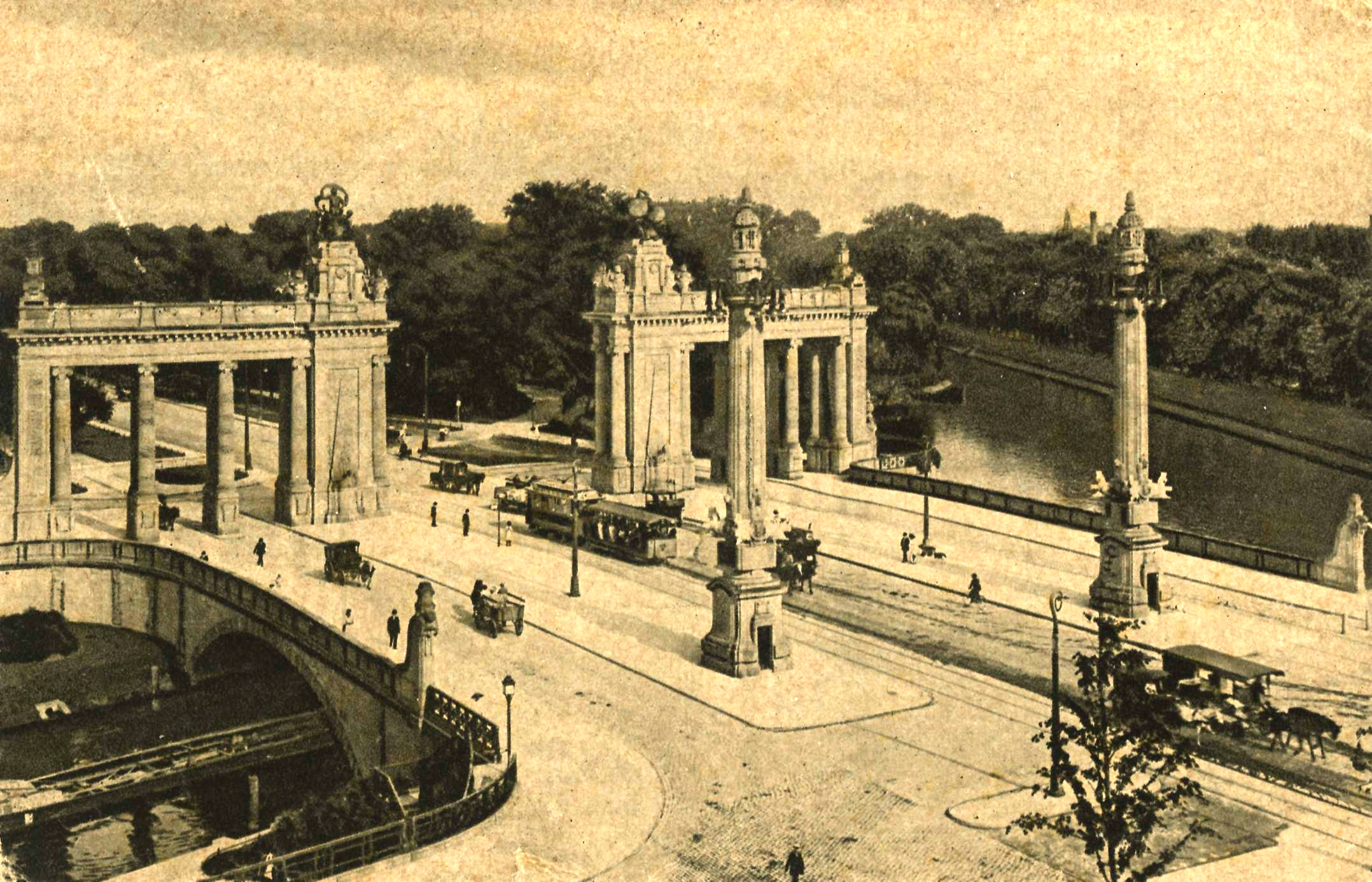
Charlottenburg Gate shortly after completion

Construction of the new bridge across the Landwehr Canal with a width of 55 metres (180 ft) started in 1904. After the demolition of the custom houses, the tuff porticoes and the 22-metre-high (72 ft) candelabra were erected in 1907. The two inner pylons left a 15-metre-wide (49 ft) gap for the traffic, flanked with larger-than-life bronze statues of King Frederick I of Prussia, the founder of Charlottenburg, and his consort Sophia Charlotte of Hanover.

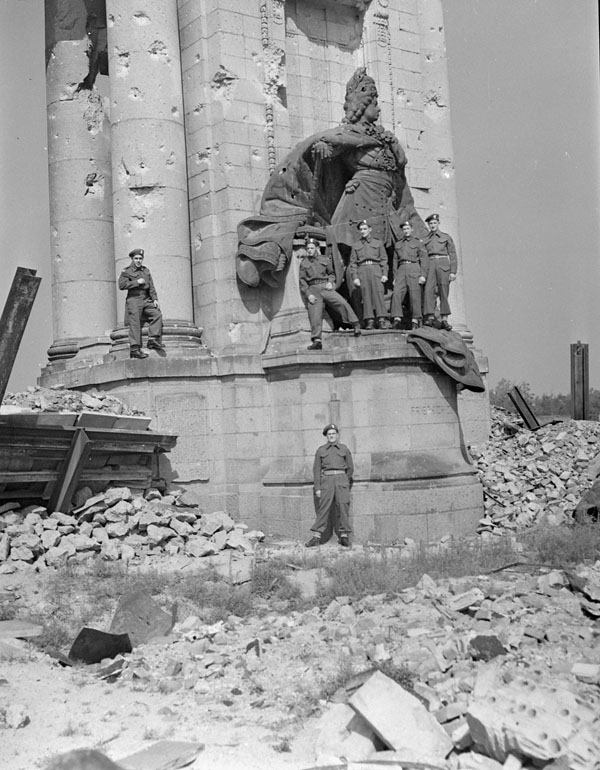
Canadian soldiers at war-damaged southern pylon, July 1945

In the course of the Nazi Welthauptstadt Germania plans, Adolf Hitler's chief architect Albert Speer in 1937 ordered the Charlottenburger Chaussee road widened to an "East-West-Axis". To enable a continuous view on street level, the bridge was flattened and broadened, while the candelabra and the porticoes were dismantled and moved further apart to a distance of 33 metres (108 ft). Charlottenburg Gate and its surrounds were heavily damaged during World War II and the final Battle of Berlin, when in April 1945 forces of the Polish 1st Infantry Division, pushing eastwards to the Berlin city centre, fought against retiring Wehrmacht troops.

== Restoration ==
By 1970, Charlottenburg Gate and its surrounds had been restored in their 1930s position, except for the candelabra in front, which were razed to their foundations shortly after the war. A second complete renovation was begun in 2004, co-financed by a private cultural heritage foundation and a disputed giant advertisement poster. Finally, the two candelabra were rebuilt in 2009.

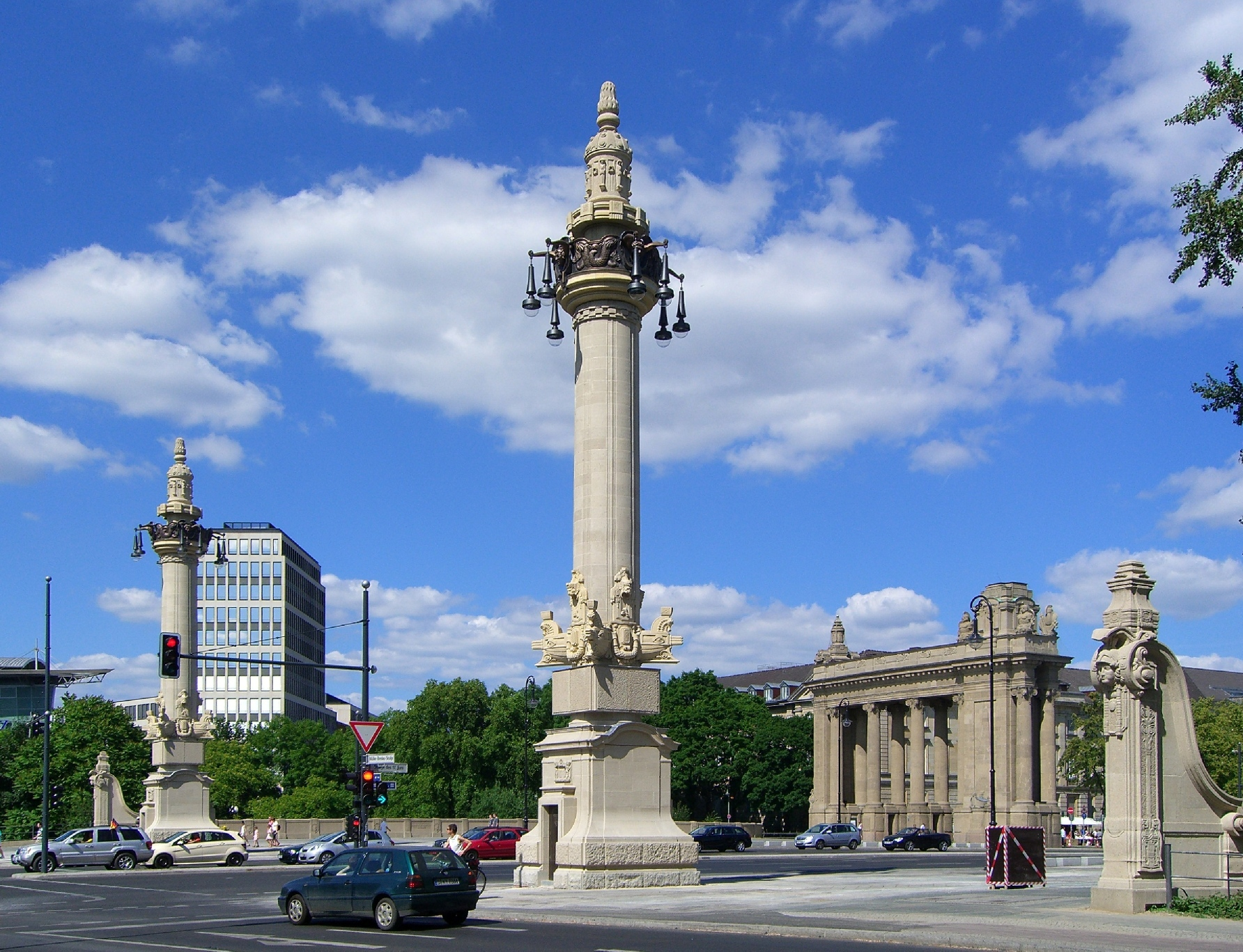
Charlottenburg Gate with candelabra, 2010 condition

The public debate continues, whether it is adequate to restore the gate ensemble in its original Wilhelmine condition while the general impression remains affected by the 1930s relocation with respect to modern traffic. A friends' society has established a small exhibition on the gate's history in a former facility room beneath the northern portico, which can be visited on Saturday afternoons.

== See also ==
- Charlottenburg Town Hall
- Charlottenburg Palace
