= Fritz Schumacher (architect) =

German architect and urban designer

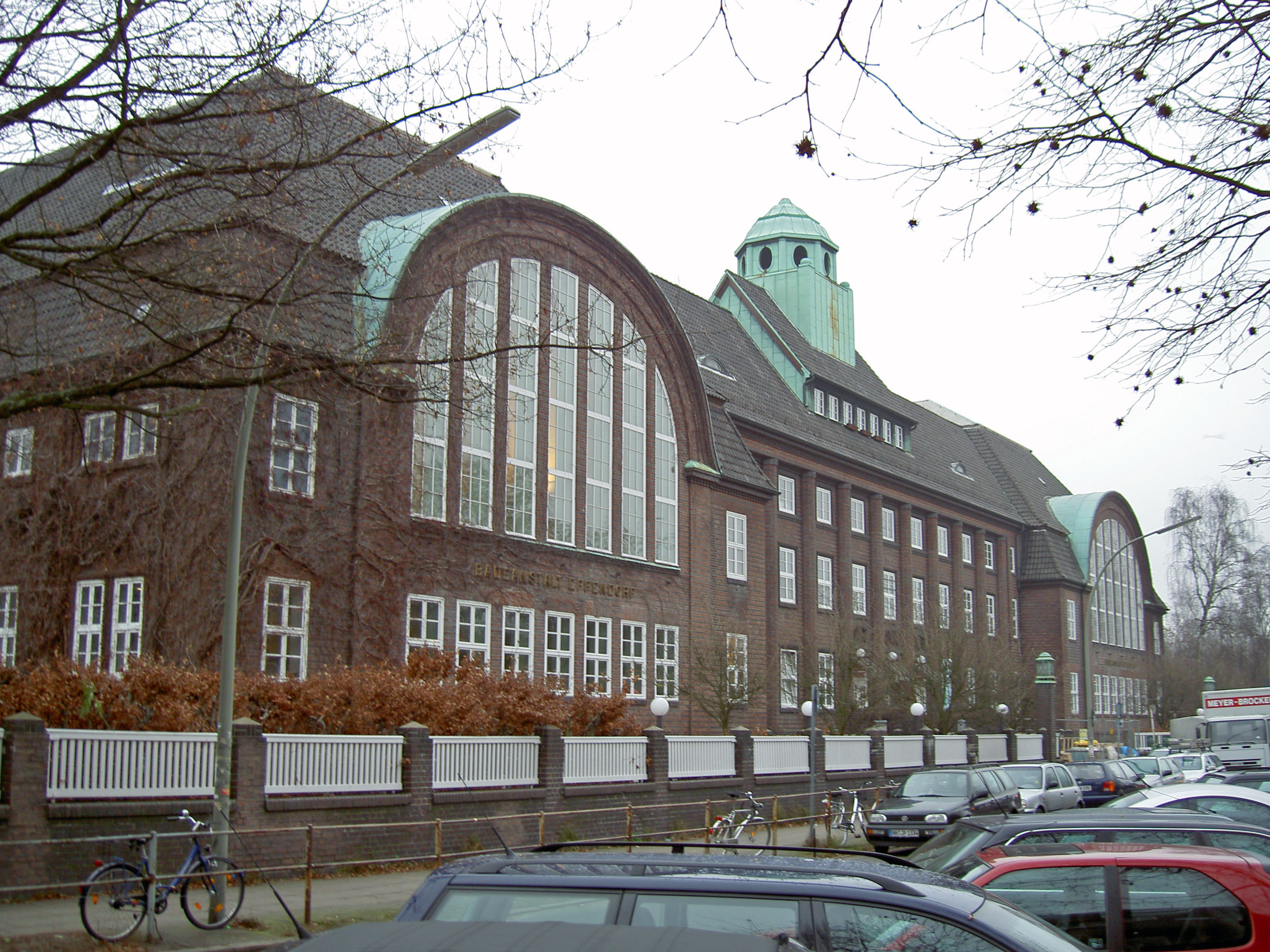
Hamburg Municipal Baths

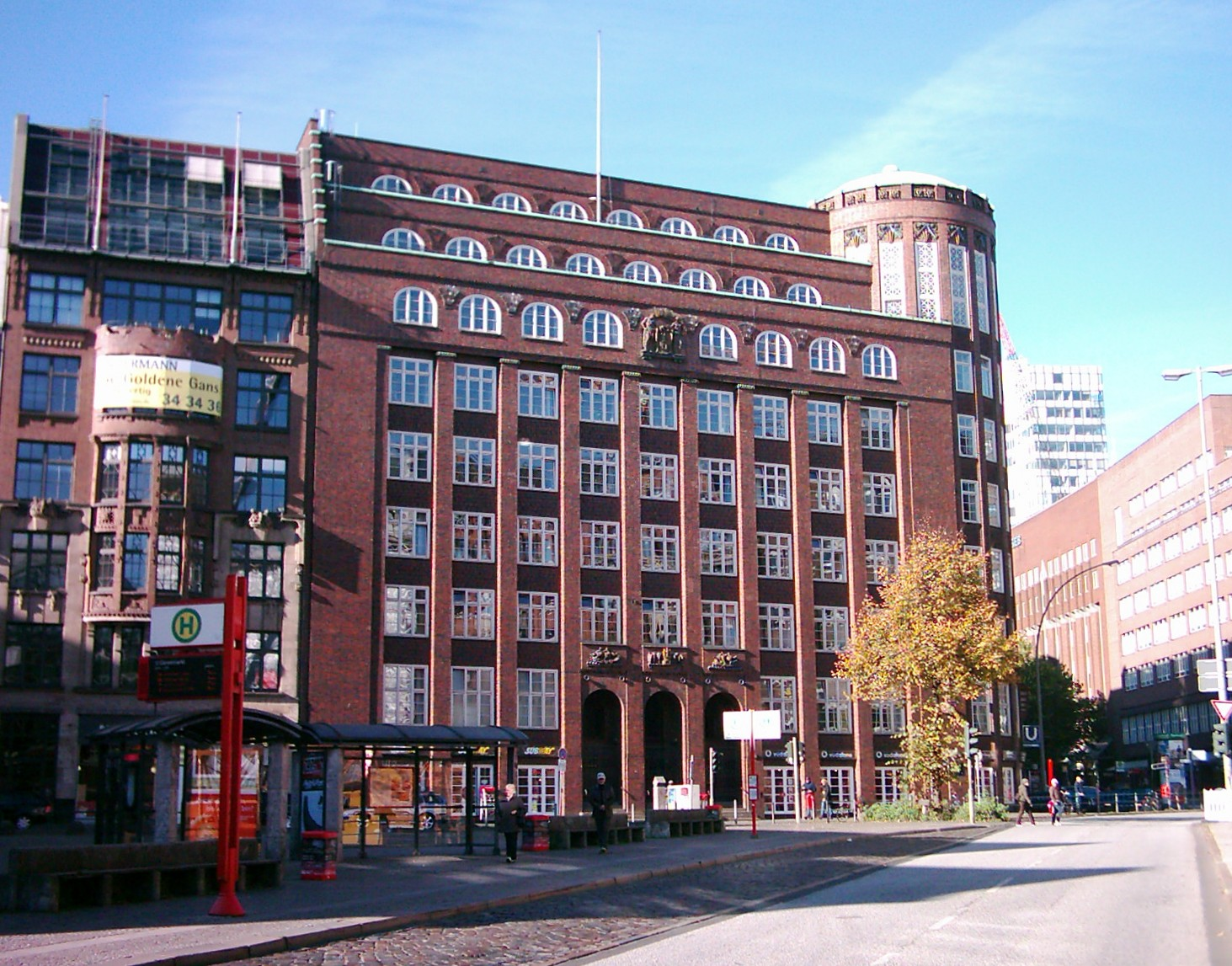
Finance agency (Finanzbehörde) Hamburg

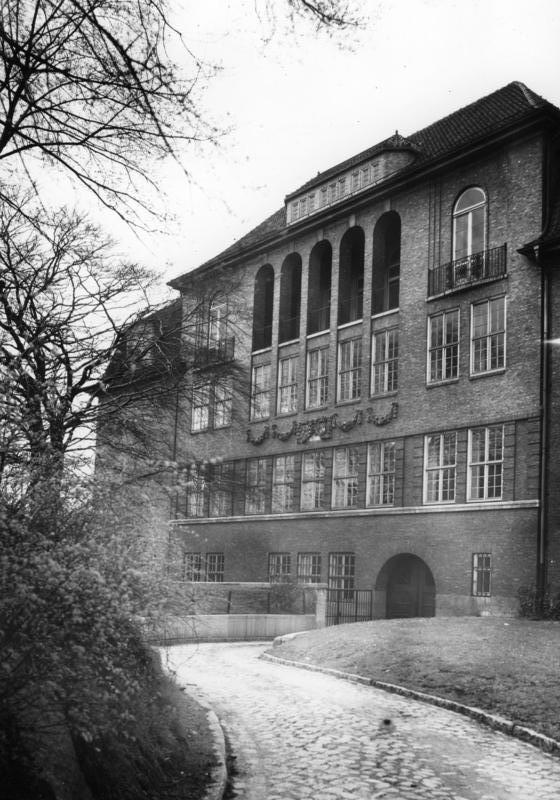
Museum für Hamburgische Geschichte in 1930

Fritz Schumacher (4 November 1869 – 5 November 1947) was a German architect and urban designer.

== Biography ==
Schumacher was born into a diplomatic family in Bremen in 1869. The family Schumacher has been living there since 15th century.

He spent his childhood in Bogotá, Colombia (1872–74) and in New York (1875–83). After studying in Munich and Berlin, in 1901 Schumacher became a professor for interior design at the technical university in Dresden. He constructed many municipal buildings there, often with former student and architectural sculptor Richard Kuöhl.

1908, age 39, he accepted an offer as building director for the city of Hamburg, and took up that post in 1909. His designs for the buildings in Hamburg included the Museum für Hamburgische Geschichte and the Staatliche Gewerbeschule Hamburg. These designs till his retirement in 1933 changed the face of the city towards the art and architecture movement of Neue Sachlichkeit and gave an emphasis on the local building material of "brick". The legacy of his achievements are still visible in many districts of Hamburg today, and very often base for the city's current urban design issues. Schumacher died in 1947 in a hospital in Hamburg.

== List of works ==
See List of works by Fritz Schumacher
