= Charlottenburg Town Hall =

City hall in Charlottenburg, Berlin, Germany

- Rathaus Charlottenburg
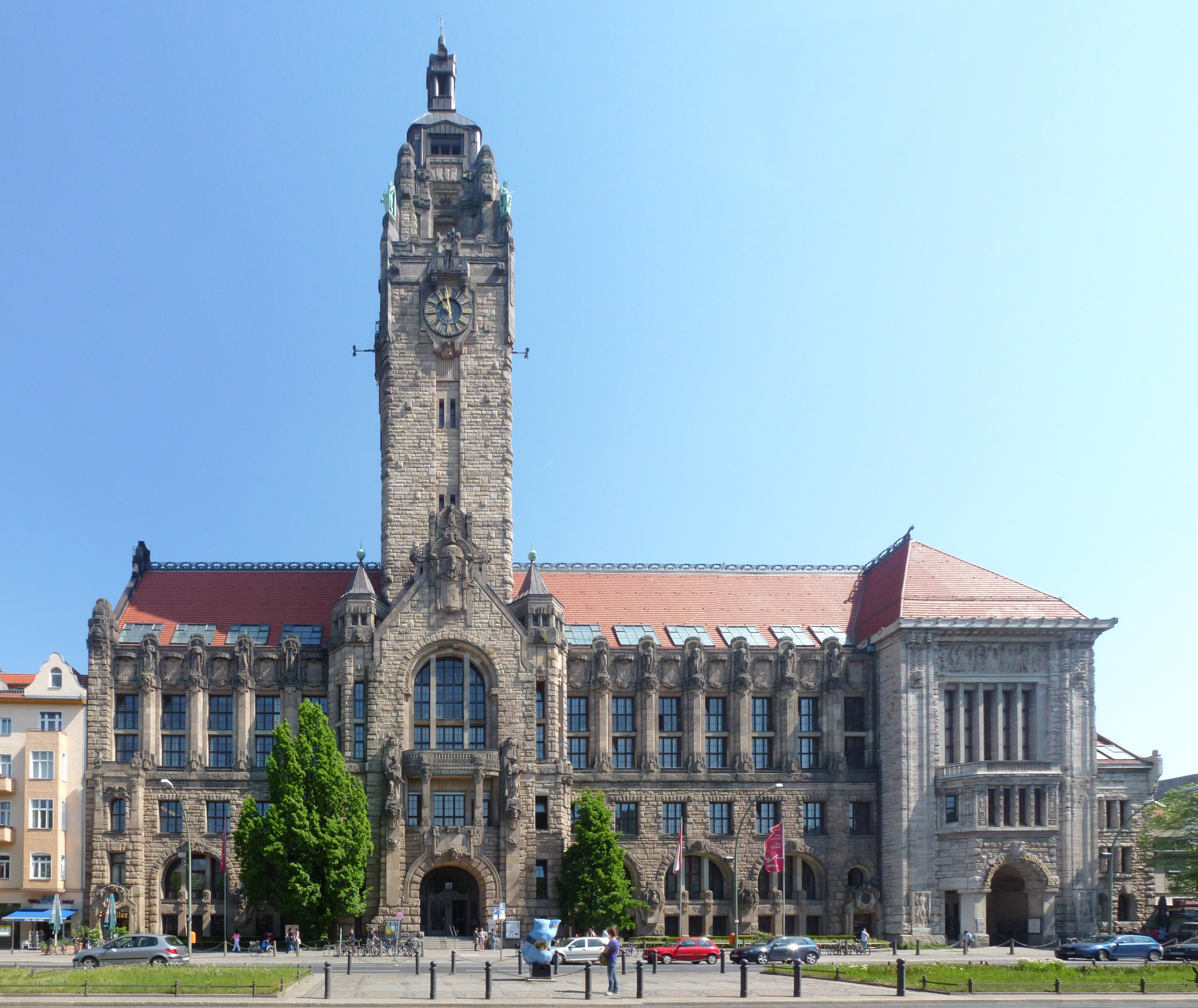
- The main frontage of the town hall in May 2013

General information
- Type: City hall
- Architectural style: Gründerzeit style
- Location: Charlottenburg, Berlin, Germany
- Coordinates: 52.5176°N 13.3088°E
- Construction started: 1899
- Completed: 1905

Height
- Height: 88 metres (289 ft)

Design and construction
- Architects: Heinrich Reinhardt and Georg Süßenguth

Charlottenburg Town Hall (German: Rathaus Charlottenburg) is a municipal building in Charlottenburg, Berlin, in eastern Germany, standing on Otto-Suhr-Allee.

== History ==
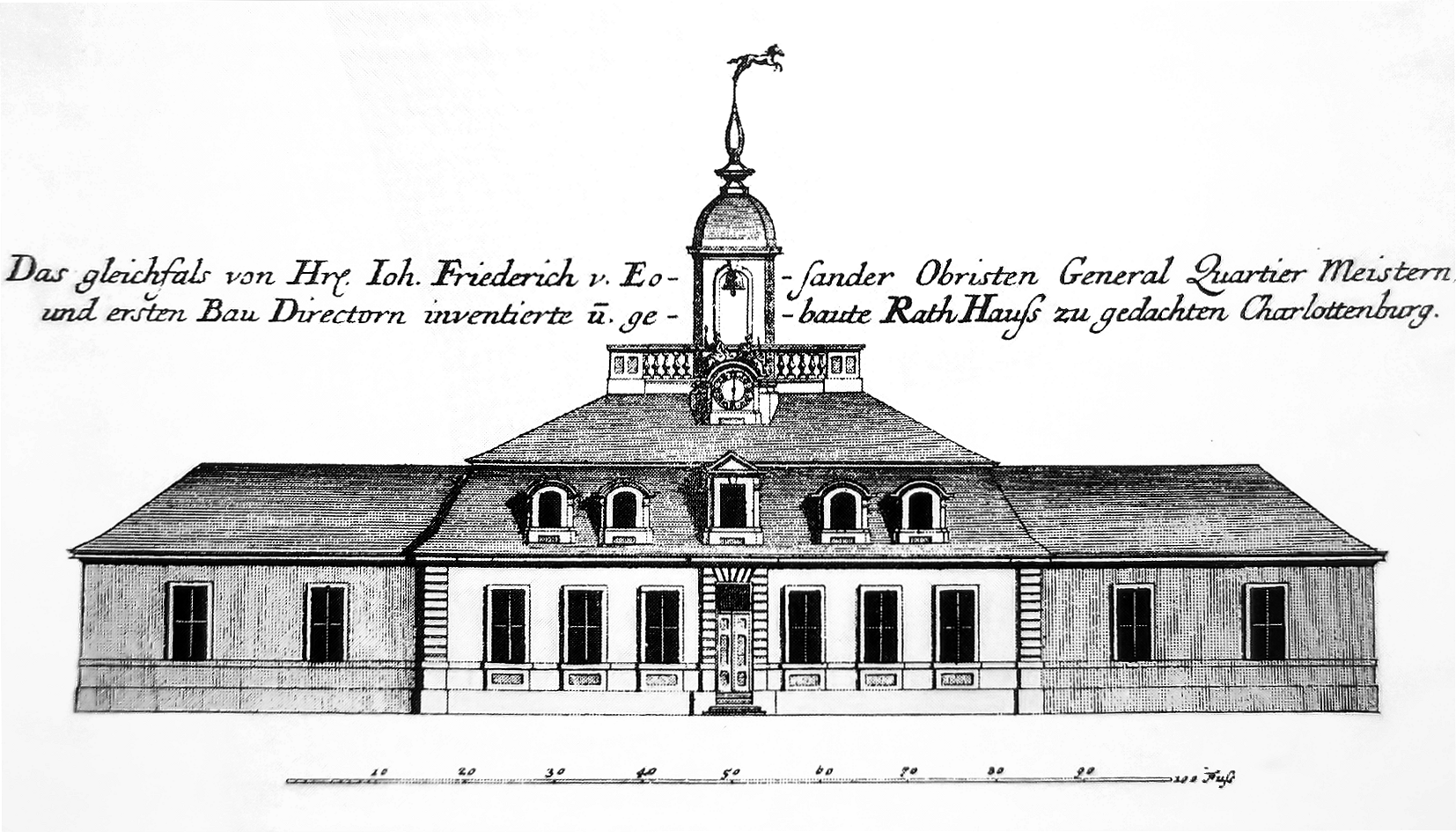
The first town hall

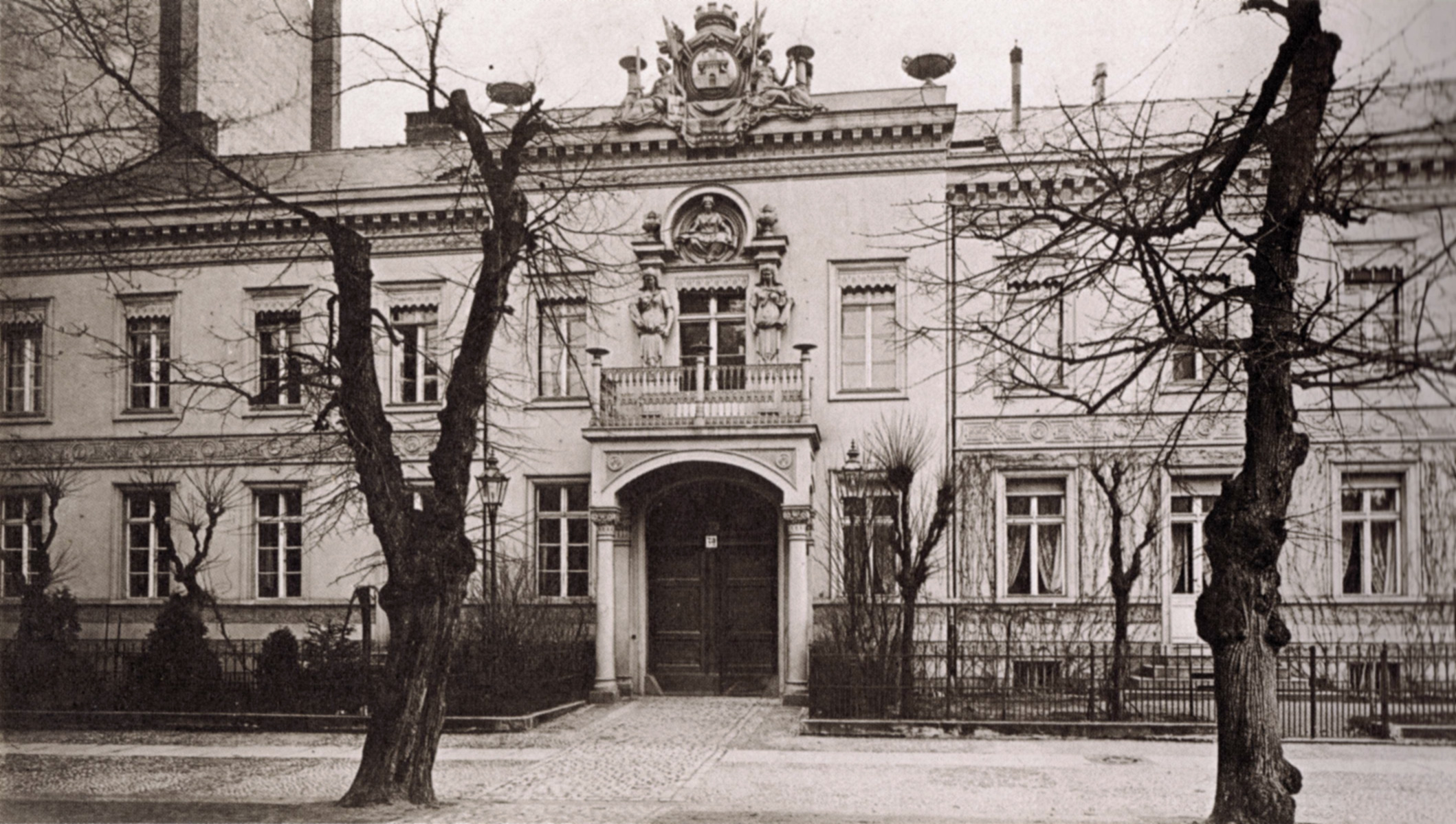
The second town hall

=== The first town hall ===
Following the death of Queen consort Sophia Charlotte of Hanover, the former village of Lietzow was renamed Charlottenburg and received town privileges by order of King Frederick I of Prussia on 5 April 1705. The town's population consisted mainly of royal officials and initially the king also assumed the office of the mayor. The king offered an existing court building opposite the Charlottenburg Palace for use as the first town hall. It had been designed by Johann Friedrich Eosander in the neoclassical style, built in ashlar stone and had been completed in 1702. The design involved a symmetrical main frontage of 11 bays facing onto the street. The single-storey structure featured a square-headed doorway with voussoirs; a square lantern was added in 1707.

=== The second town hall ===
In the mid-19th century, following significant population growth, the council decided to acquire a more substantial building. The building they selected for use as the second town hall was on the northeastern side of what is now Otto-Suhr-Allee. The foundation stone for the building had been laid by King Frederick William II on 26 May 1791. It had been designed in the neoclassical style, built in ashlar stone and had probably been completed in around 1792. The design involved a symmetrical main frontage of 11 bays facing onto the street. The central bay featured a porch formed by a pair of Ionic order columns supporting an entablature on the ground floor, a French door flanked by statues on the first floor, and a coat of arms above. Following conversion for municipal use, it was officially opened on 5 December 1860.

=== The third town hall ===
By 1900, Charlottenburg had become an affluent city and its citizens decided to demolish the second town hall and to hold an architectural competition to build a more substantial town hall on the same site.

The new building was designed by Heinrich Reinhardt and Georg Süßenguth in the Gründerzeit style, built with a 70 m (230 ft) long Wünschelburg sandstone façade and was officially opened on the town's 200-years-jubilee in April 1905. The design involved a near-symmetrical main frontage of 11 bays facing onto the street. The central bay was formed by a three-stage tower, which was 88 m (289 ft) high, exceeding the dome of Charlottenburg Palace. The first stage, which spanned three floors, featured a large round-headed opening with voussoirs and a keystone on the ground floor, a tri-partite window on the second floor and a tall round-headed window with voussoirs and a balcony on the second floor. The second stage involved two pairs of lancet windows surmounted by a clock, while the third stage involved a square-headed niche flanked by large finials. The tower was crowned by a lantern. The wings were fenestrated by large round-headed windows on the ground floor, by small square-headed casement windows on the first floor and by tall casement windows on the second floor. The windows on the second floor were flanked by canted columns supporting statues, which were created by the sculptors Josef Drischler, Johannes Götz, Heinrich Günther and Wilhelm Haverkamp. Internally, the principal room was the Sitzungssaal (council chamber) on the second floor.

The building was enlarged with an eastern annex built according to plans designed by Heinrich Seeling between 1911 and 1916.

Charlottenburg, which at the time of construction of the building had been an independent city (German: Stadtkreis), was incorporated into Greater Berlin in 1920. The building was heavily damaged by the allied bombing of Berlin on the night of 22 November 1943 during the Second World War and was restored to the original plans in the 1960s.

Following the 2001 Berlin administrative reform, the town hall became one of the offices for the newly constituted borough of Charlottenburg-Wilmersdorf as well as the secretariat for the district mayor.
