= Ignatius Taschner =

German sculptor, medalist, graphic designer and illustrator

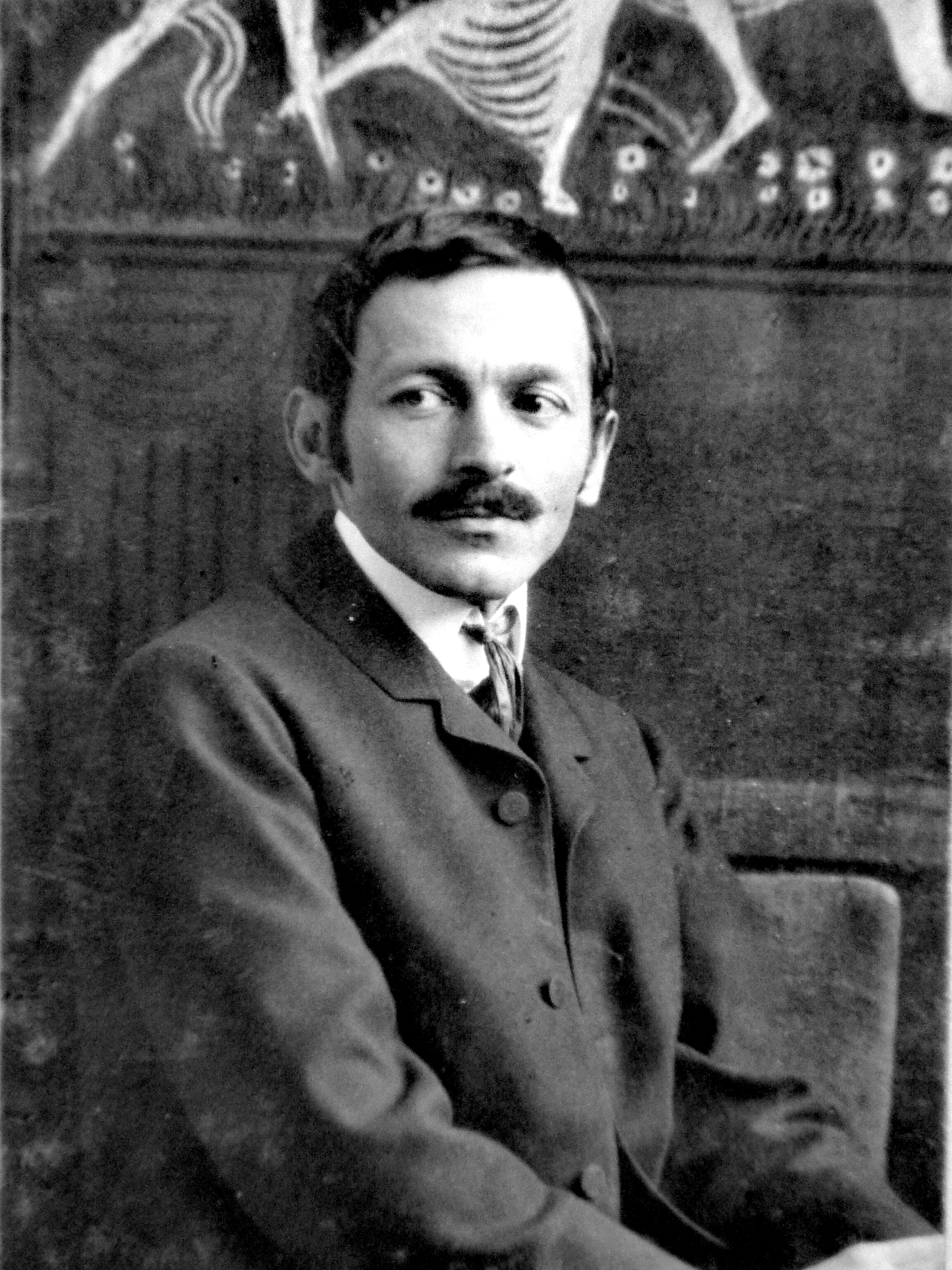
- Tachner c. 1900
- Born: 9 April 1871; Bad Kissingen, Germany
- Died: 25 November 1913 (aged 42); Mitterndorf near Dachau, Germany
- Education: Academy of Fine Arts, Munich
- Spouse: Helene Felber

Ignatius Taschner (9 April 1871 – 25 November 1913), also known as Ignaz Taschner, was a German sculptor, medalist, graphic designer and illustrator.

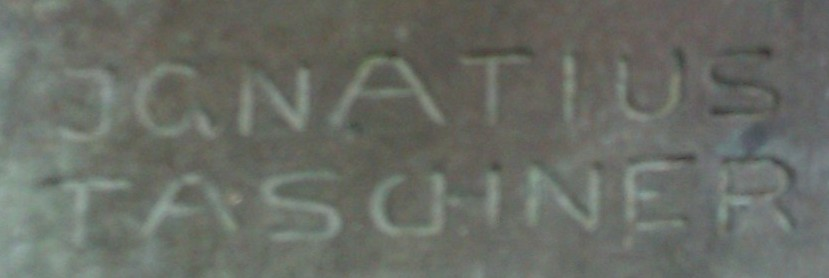
Signatur

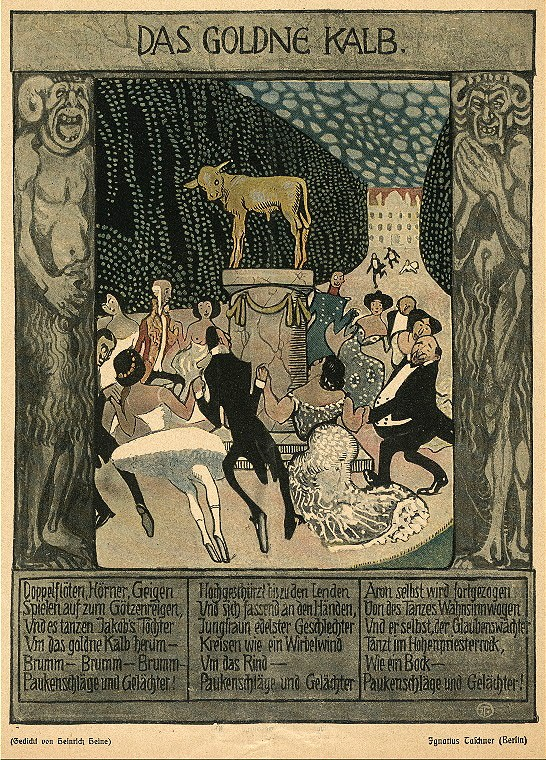
Illustriertes Gedicht von Heinrich Heine: Das goldene Kalb

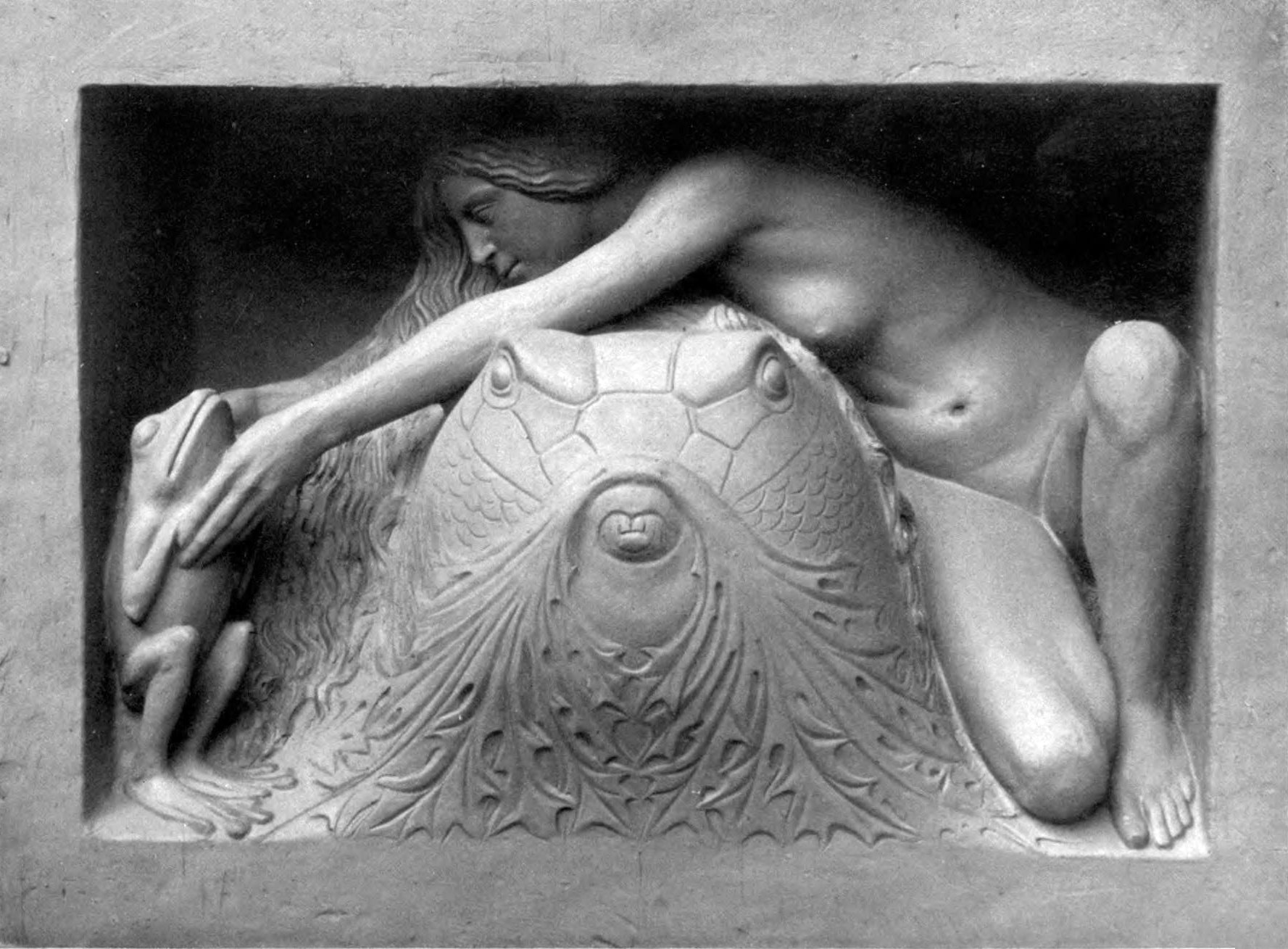
Detail vom Gustav-Freytag-Brunnen in Breslau

== Life ==
Ignatius Taschner was born in 1871, he was the son of Bartholomew Taschner, a stonemason originating from Straubing. He spent his childhood and youth in Lohr am Main. From 1885 to 1888 he completed an apprenticeship as a stonemason in Schweinfurt with the sculptor Wilhelm Kämpf and worked there for a year as a journeyman. He then studied from 1889 to 1895 at the Munich Academy of Fine Arts under Syrius Eberle and Jakob Bradl. Among his fellow students were the sculptor Georg Wrba and Josef Rauch. On 27 April 1899, he married Helene Felber.

== Work ==
In 1894, he received his first contract from the city of Schweinfurt to work on a war memorial. Around the turn of the century Taschner had been making a substantial impression on the artists of the Munich, Vienna and Berlin Secessions. Taschner's early period ended in 1897 with an order from Karl von Marr for a tomb for the Berlin painter Carl Bennewitz von Loefen. Then in 1898, working for the architects Helbig & Haiger, he made a series of decorative murals in the Munich Kunstgewerbehaus as well as for an exhibition in the Glasspalast. He received his first orders for graphics from the Viennese publisher Martin Gerlach. He drew invitations and postcards for the carnival party ″Schwabinger Bauernkirchweih″ of the Association of Art students in Munich in 1898 (and for all other ″Schwabinger Bauernkirchweih″ parties until 1905). He also created the characters ″Strauchdieb″ and ″Hl. Cäcilia″.

In 1900 he participated in the competition for a Kaiser-Friedrich monument in Oels (Oleśnica) and a Goethe Memorial in Strasbourg (3rd prize), created the group ″Rauhbein″, the illustrations for ″Grimm's Fairy Tales″ for Publisher Martin Gerlach and participated at the Paris World Exhibition with the figures ″Hl. Martin″ and ″Strauchdieb″. In 1902 he participated in a fountain competition for Kempten (2nd prize), designed a silver crucifix, created the figure ″Unterfranken″ for the New Town Hall in Munich, the etchings ″Kirchgang und Botenfuhrwerk″ and the illustrations for ″Die Nymphe des Brunnens″ and ″Kirchgang″ for the publisher Martin Gerlach.

=== Lecturer in Breslau ===
In 1903 Taschner became a lecturer at the Royal Arts and Crafts School in Breslau. He became friends with Ludwig Thoma of Munich, then editor of Simplicissimus; for whose story Der heilige Hies he contributed the illustrations. An essential part of his jewelry works was created also at this time in connection with the metal class of the Breslau School of Art.

=== Berlin – Architectural sculptures ===
In 1904 Taschner went to Berlin and worked for the famous architect Alfred Messel and especially for Ludwig Hoffmann, for whom he produced many architectural sculptures. He designed the silverware of Crown Prince Wilhelm as well as other industrial designs. Ignatius Taschner was an early member of the Deutscher Künstlerbund. In its third annual exhibition 1906 in Weimar Taschner showed the first version of the Parsival-equestrian statuette.

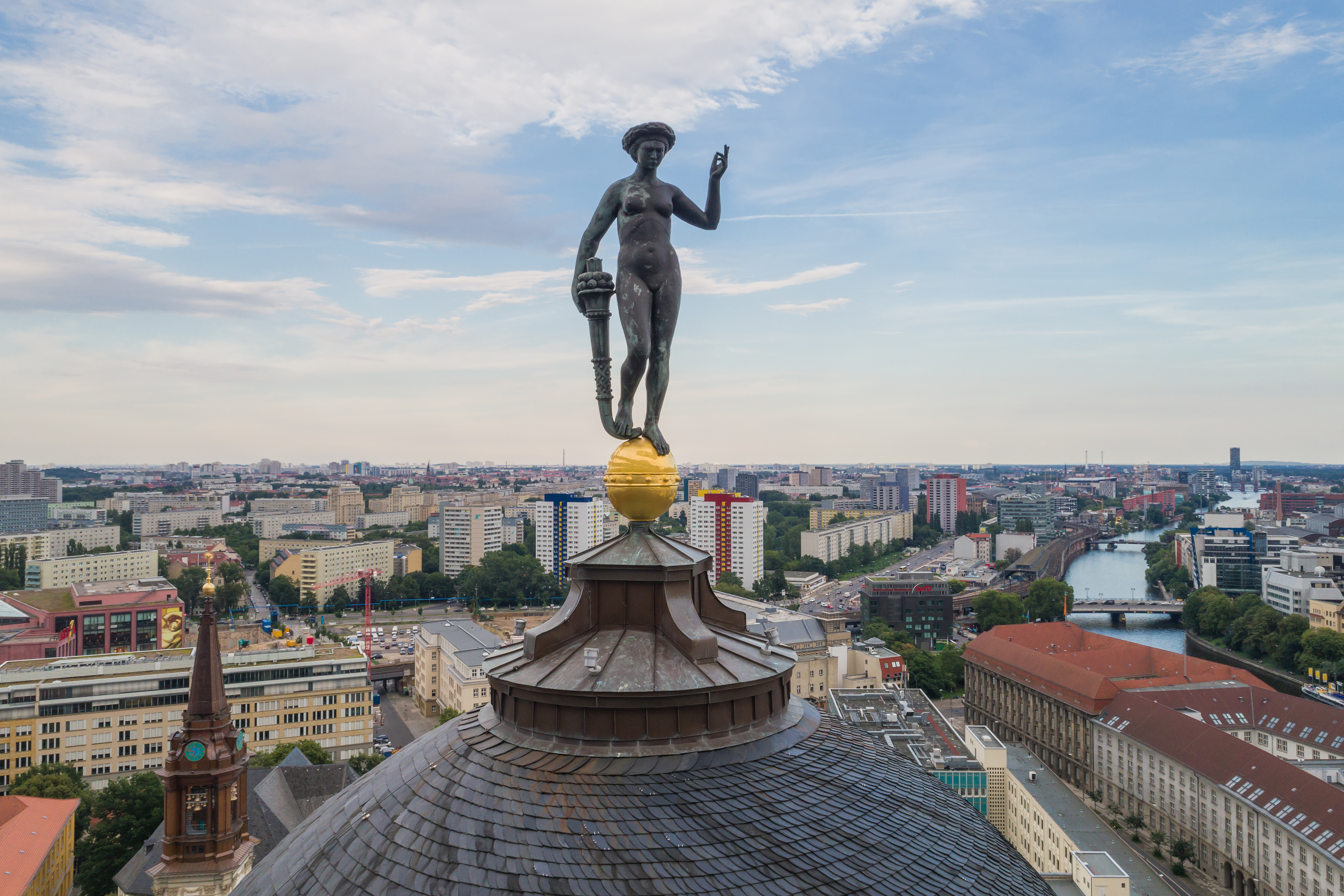
Fortuna on the Berliner Stadthaus

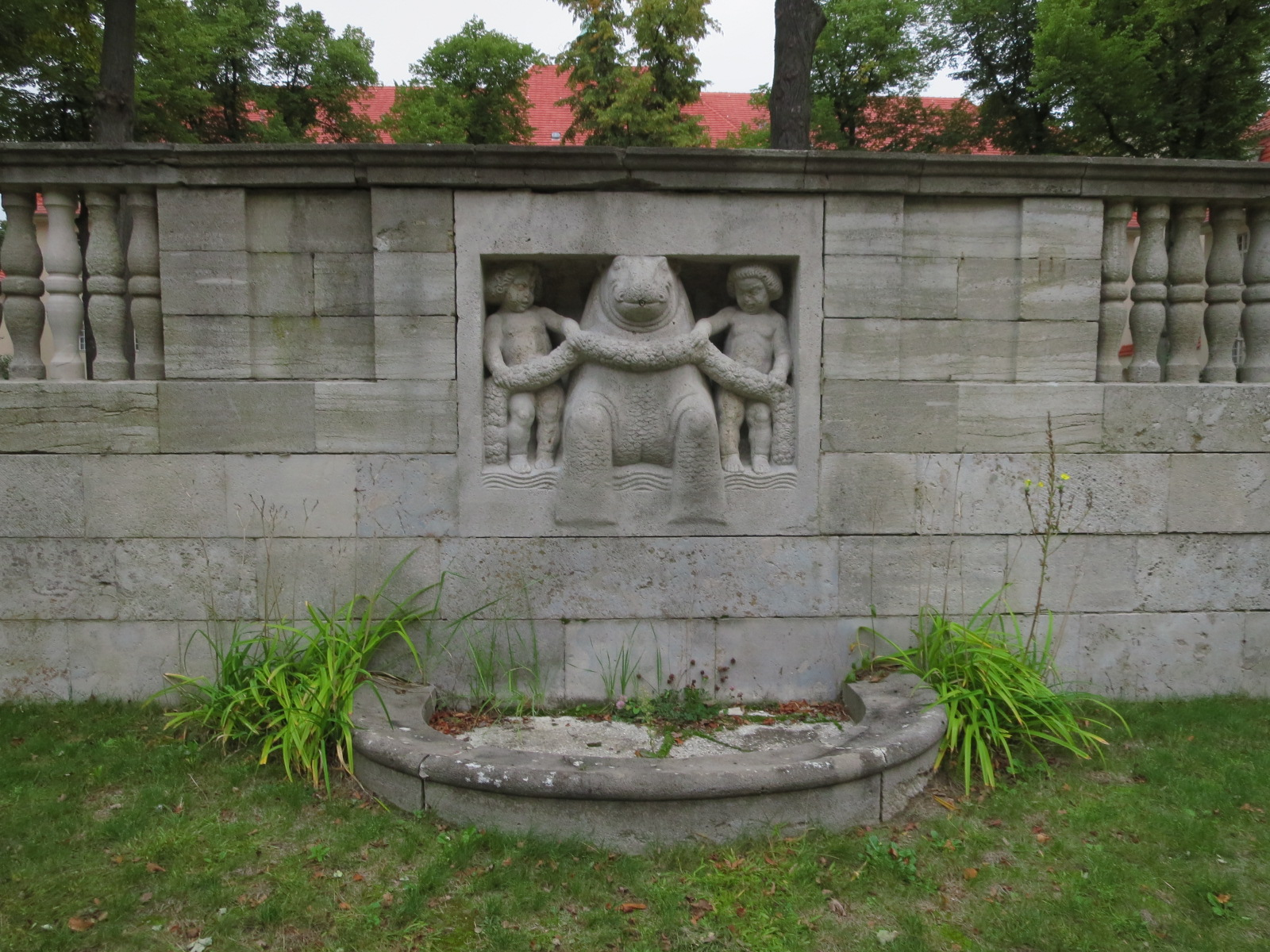
Wall fountains, Alte-Leute-Heim in Buch

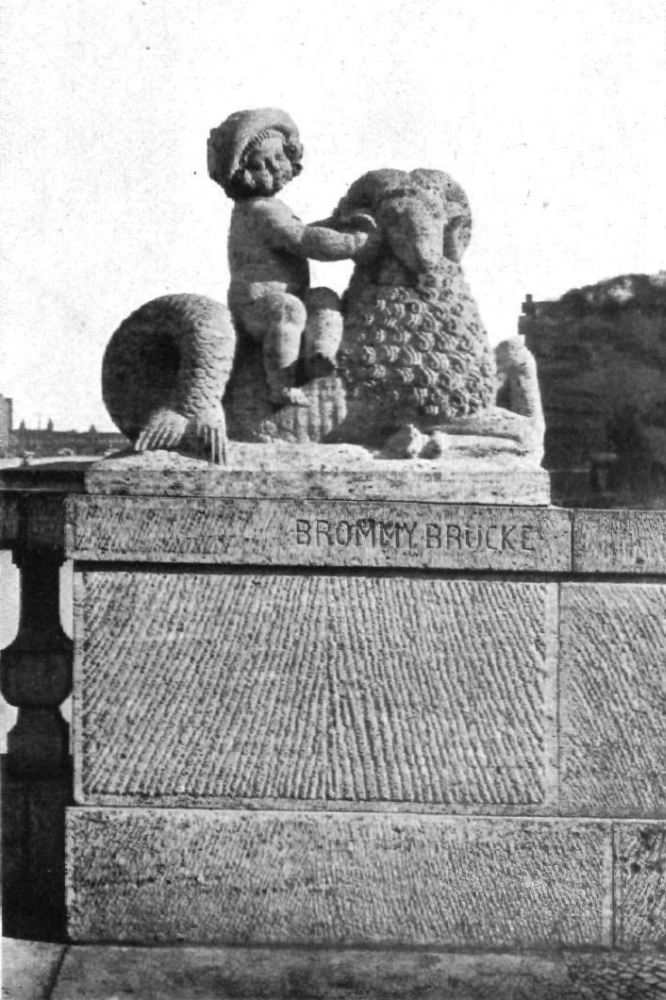
Detail der Brommybrücke Berlin

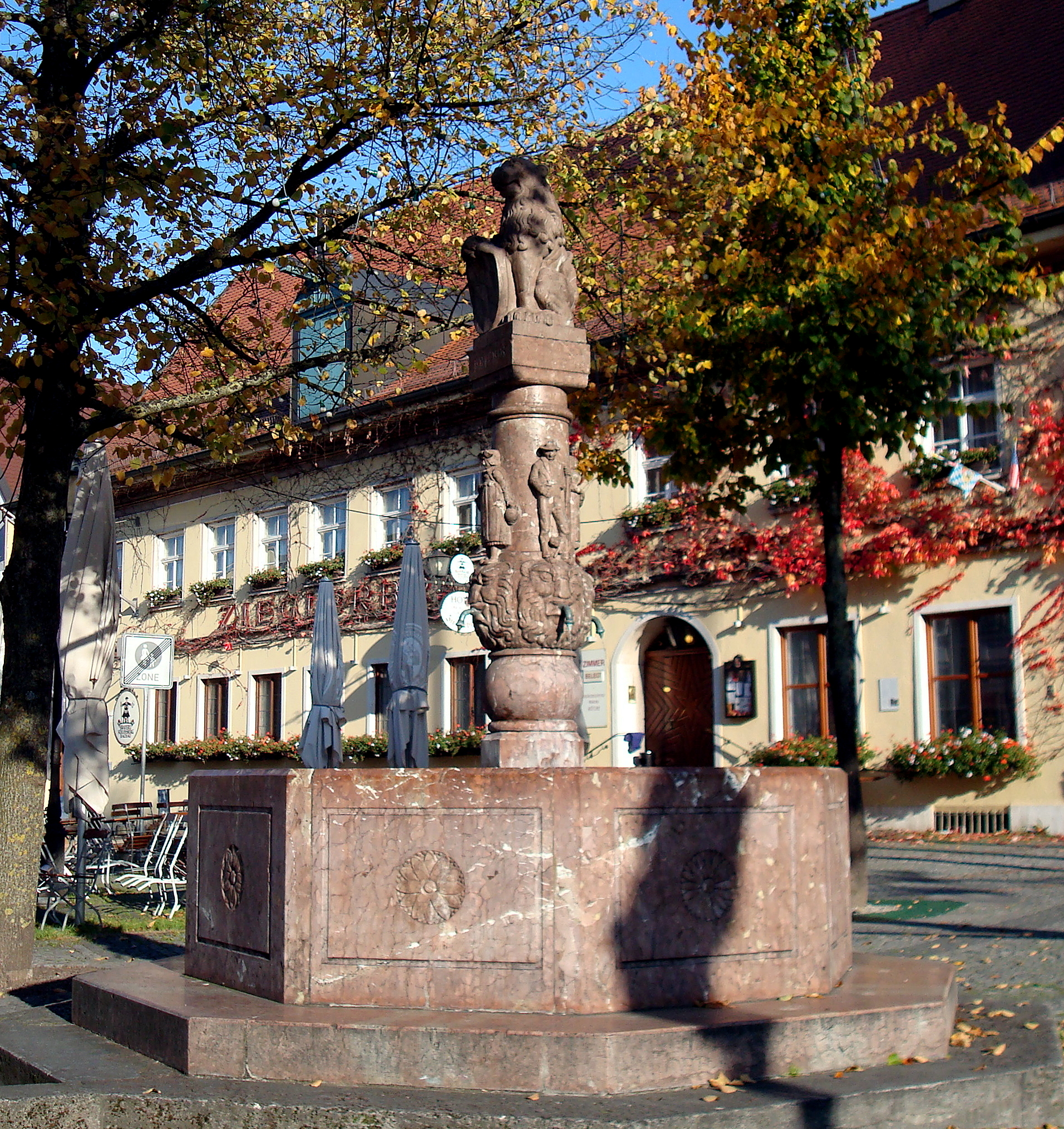
Rathausbrunnen in Dachau, Design from Taschner

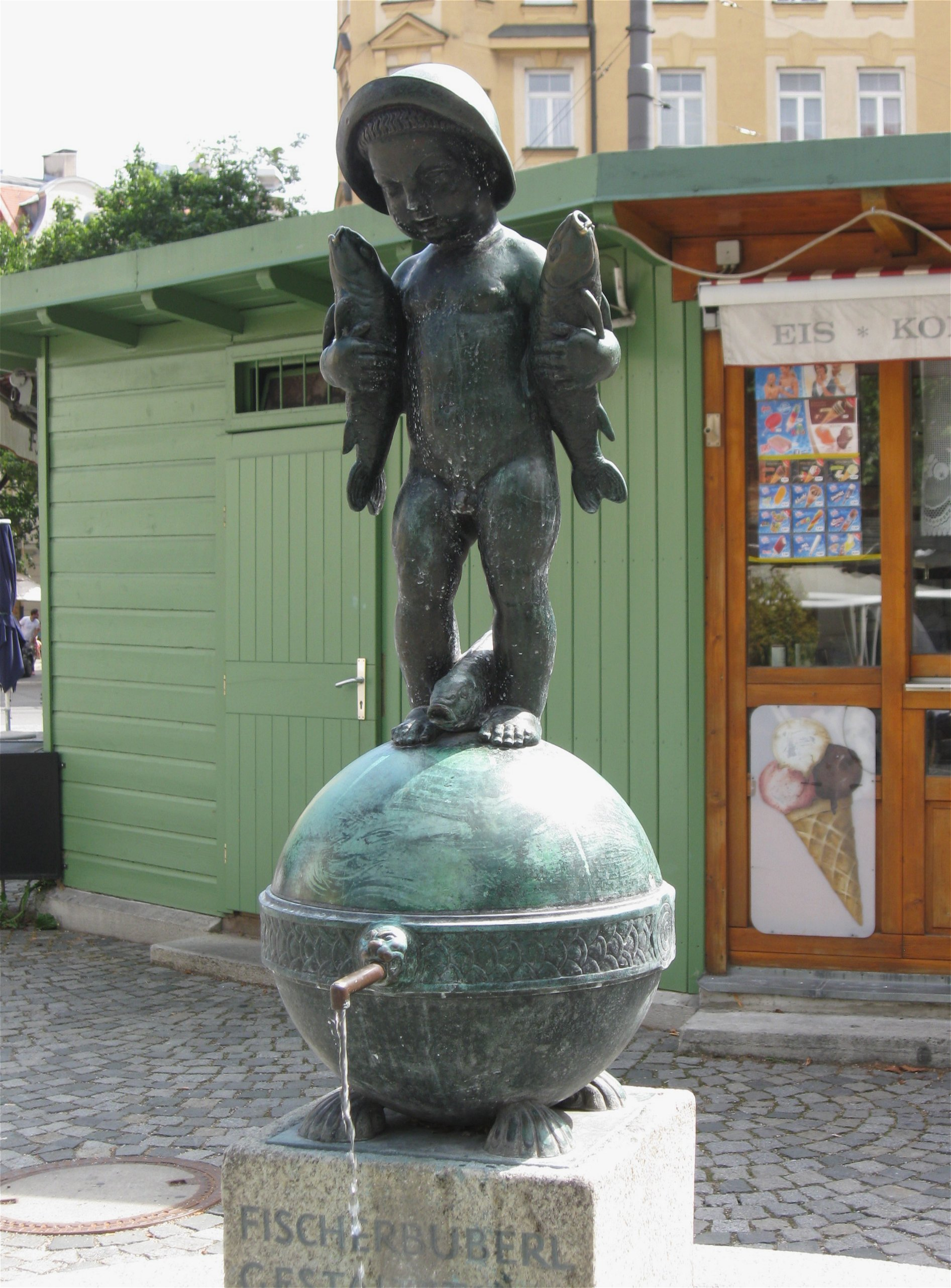
Fischerbuberl in München, Wiener Platz

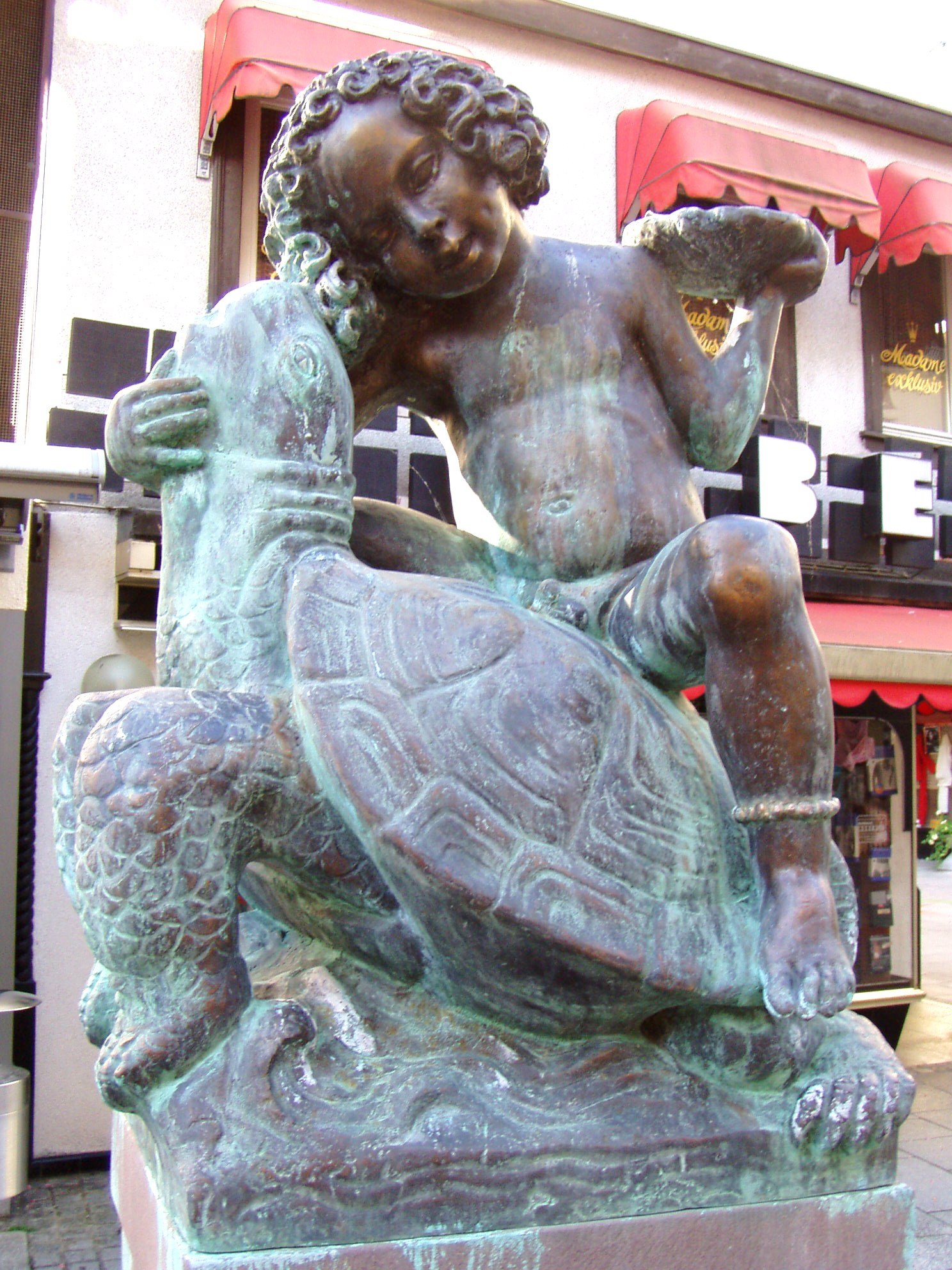
Bronze figure on the "Taschnerbrunnen" in Bad Kissingen

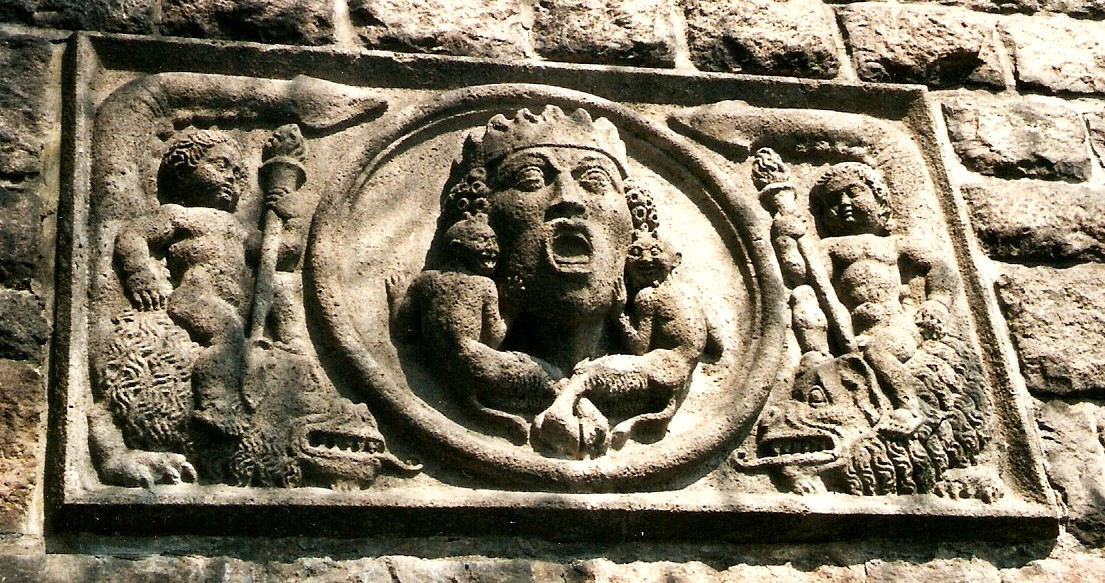
One of four reliefs on the Puppenbrücke in Lübeck

=== Mitterndorf near Dachau ===
In 1906 Taschner moved to Mitterndorf near Dachau, where he built a villa like other famous artists on a large piece of land. Soon afterwards the designs for the ten figures of the Märchenbrunnen in the Volkspark Friedrichshain in Berlin were completed. In 1911 the interior of his villa in Mitterndorf - designed by Taschner himself - was completed. Only a few years he could live together with his wife and his two little girls in his villa. He was ill and overworked and his heart stopped suddenly.

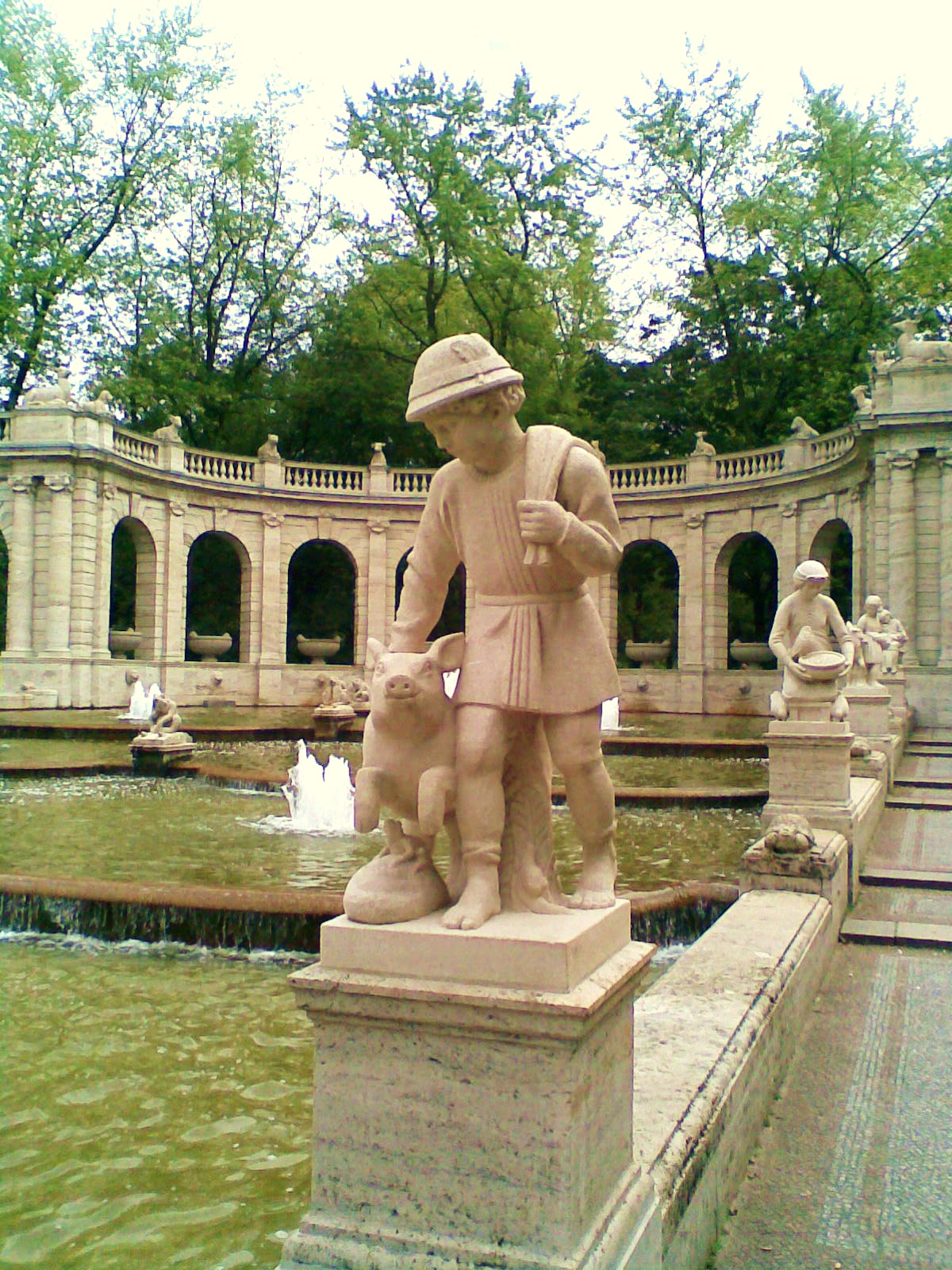
Märchenbrunnen mit Hans im Glück

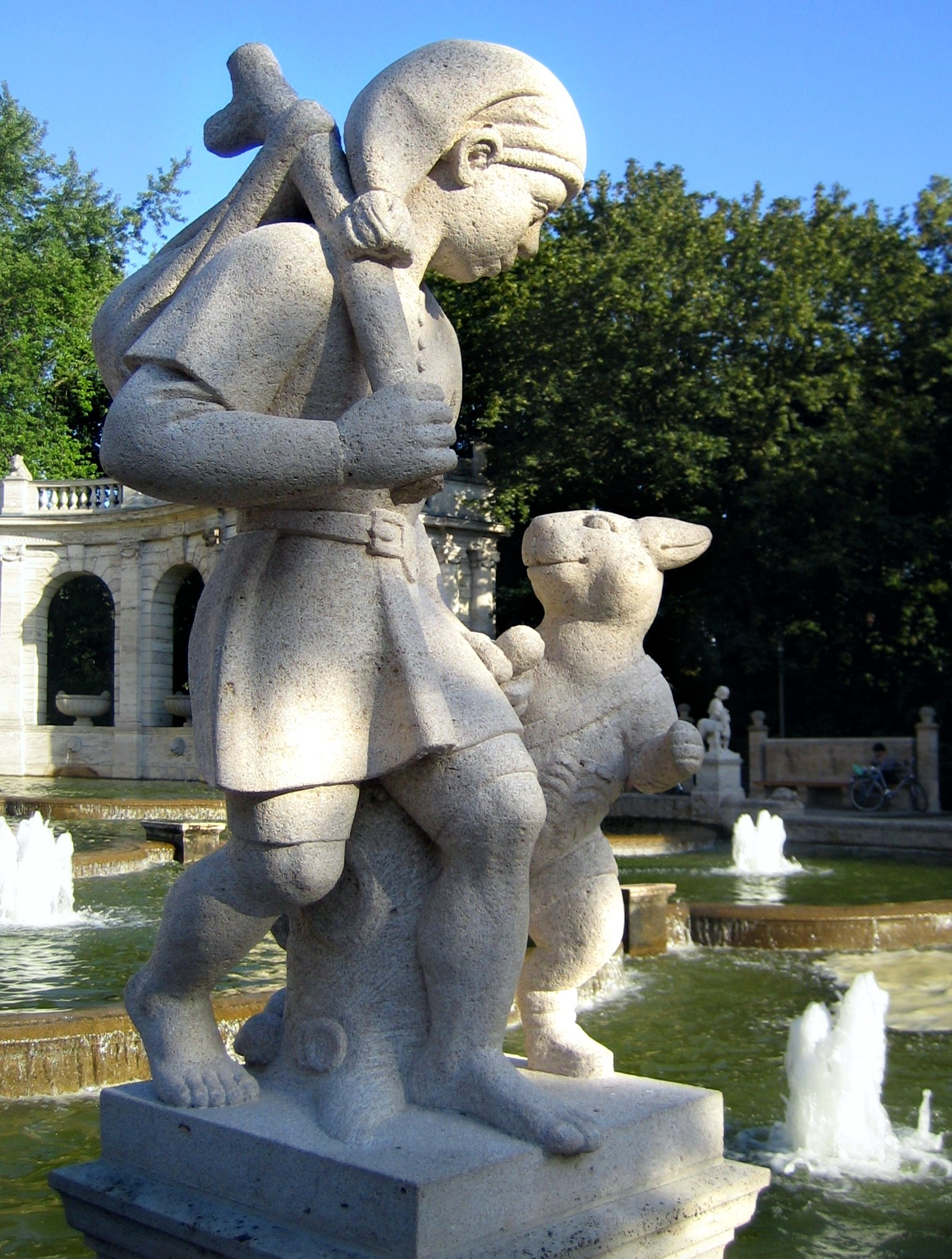
Der gestiefelte Kater / Puss in Boots

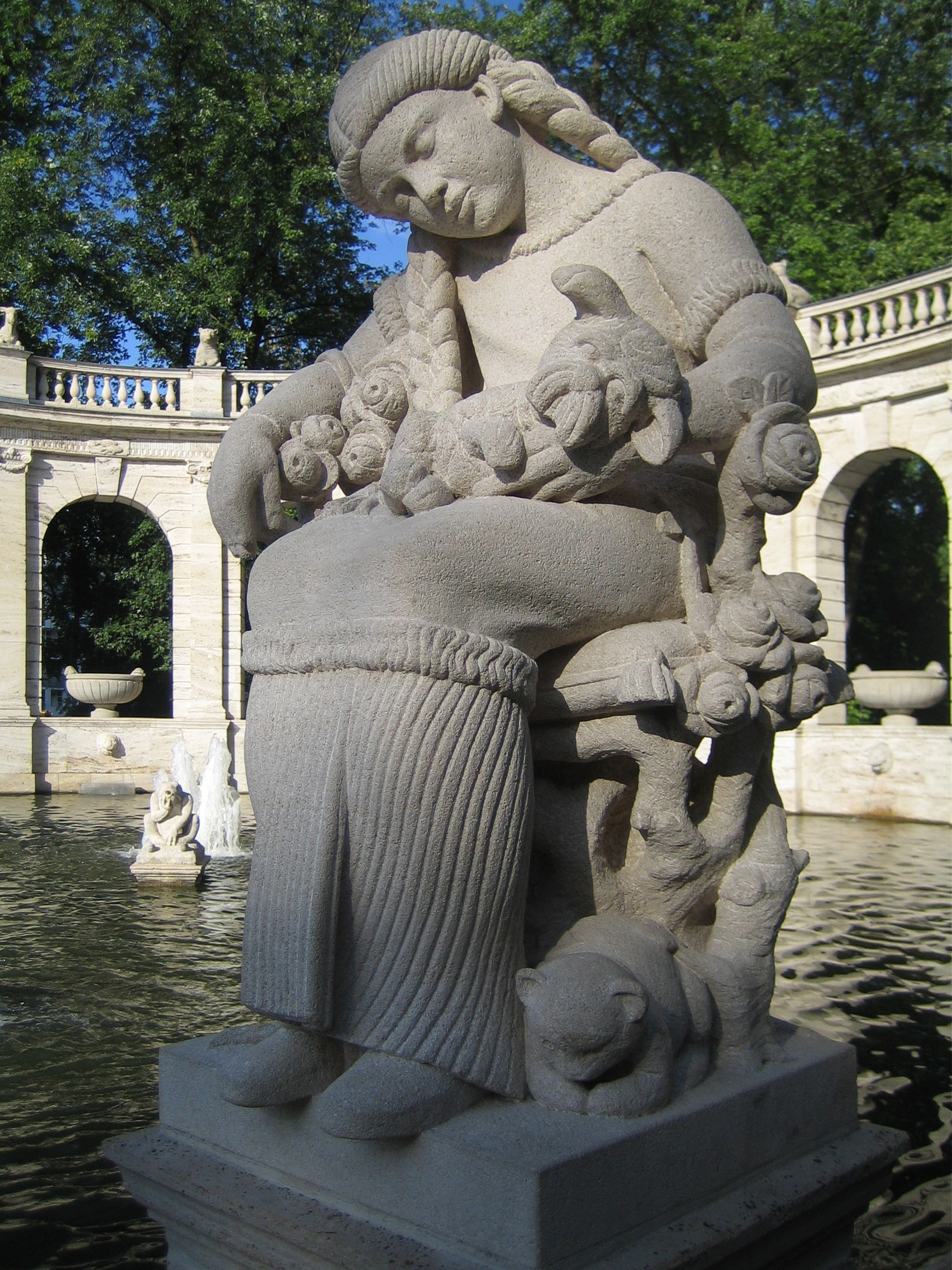
Dornröschen / Sleeping Beauty

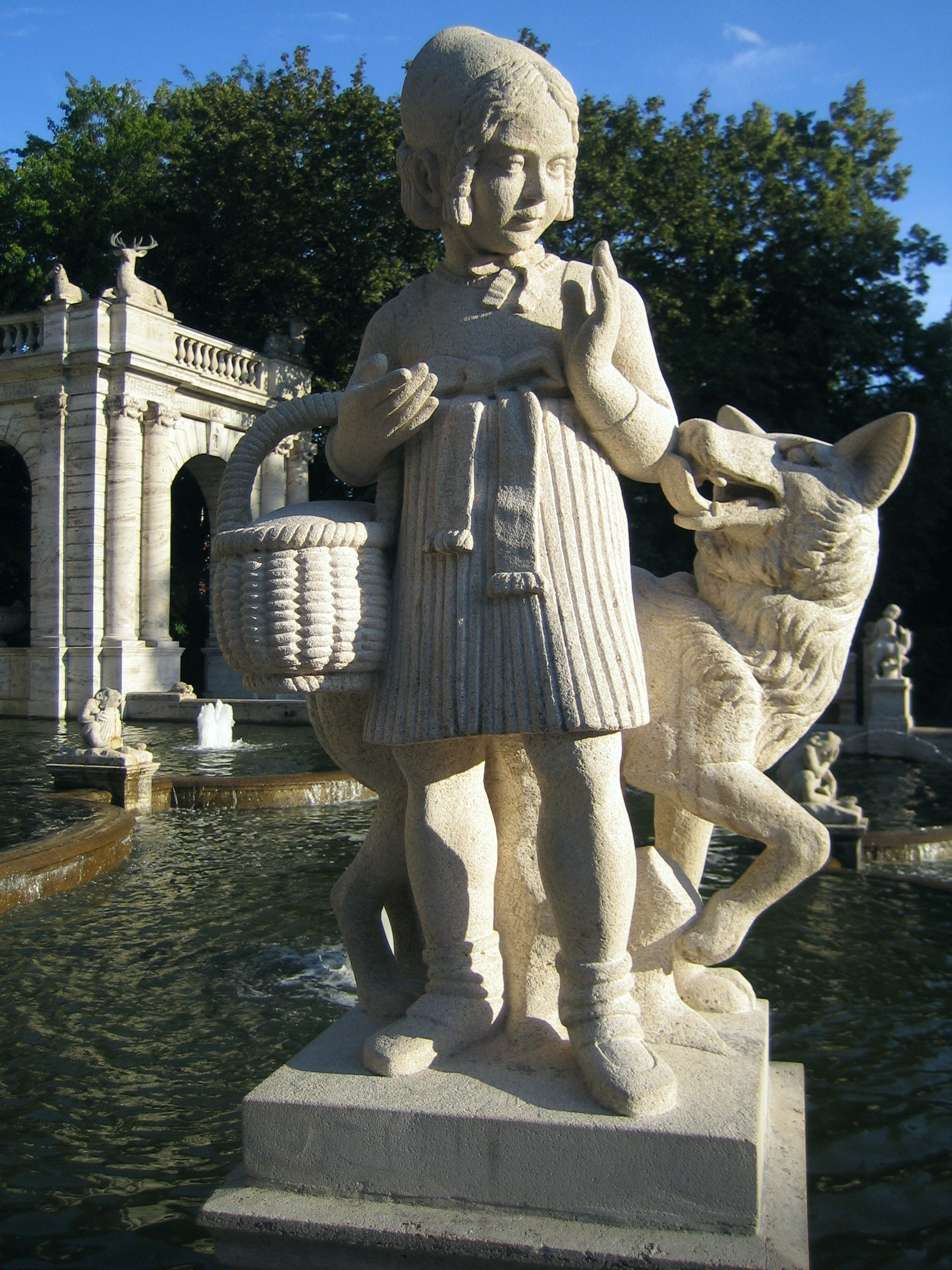
Rotkäppchen / Little Red Riding Hood

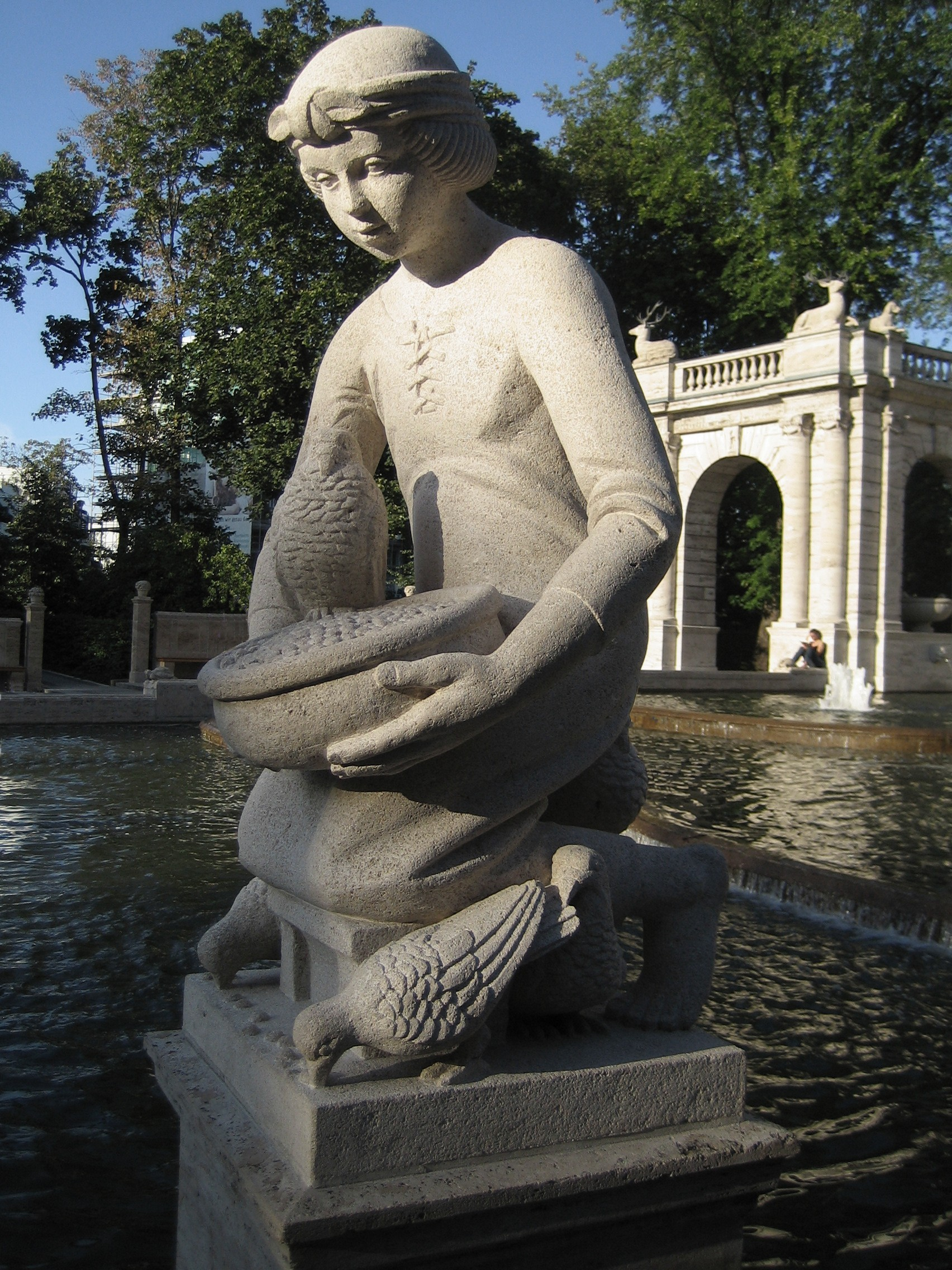
Aschenbrödel / Cinderella

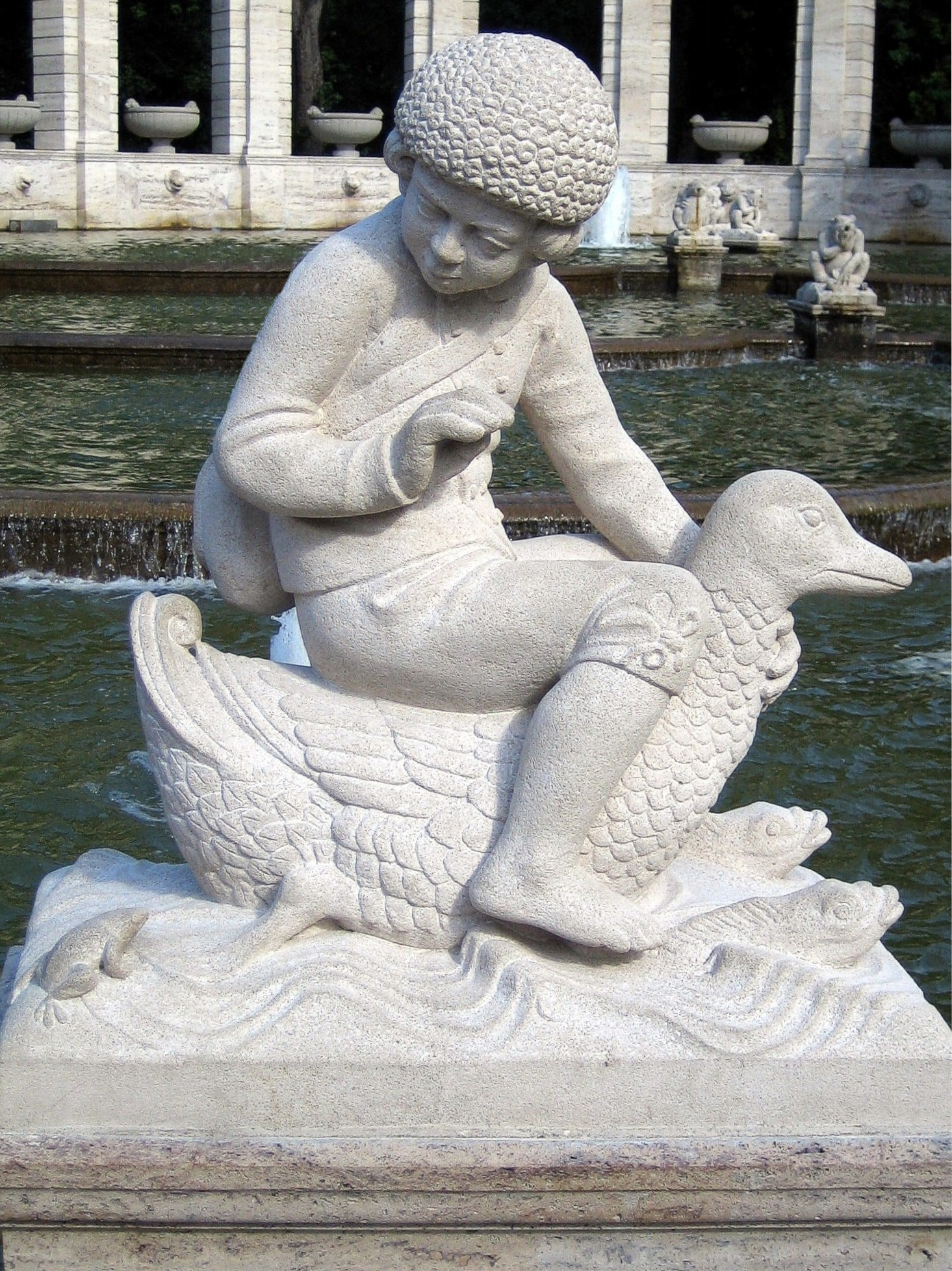
Hänsel aus 'Hänsel und Gretel' / Hansel of Hansel and Gretel

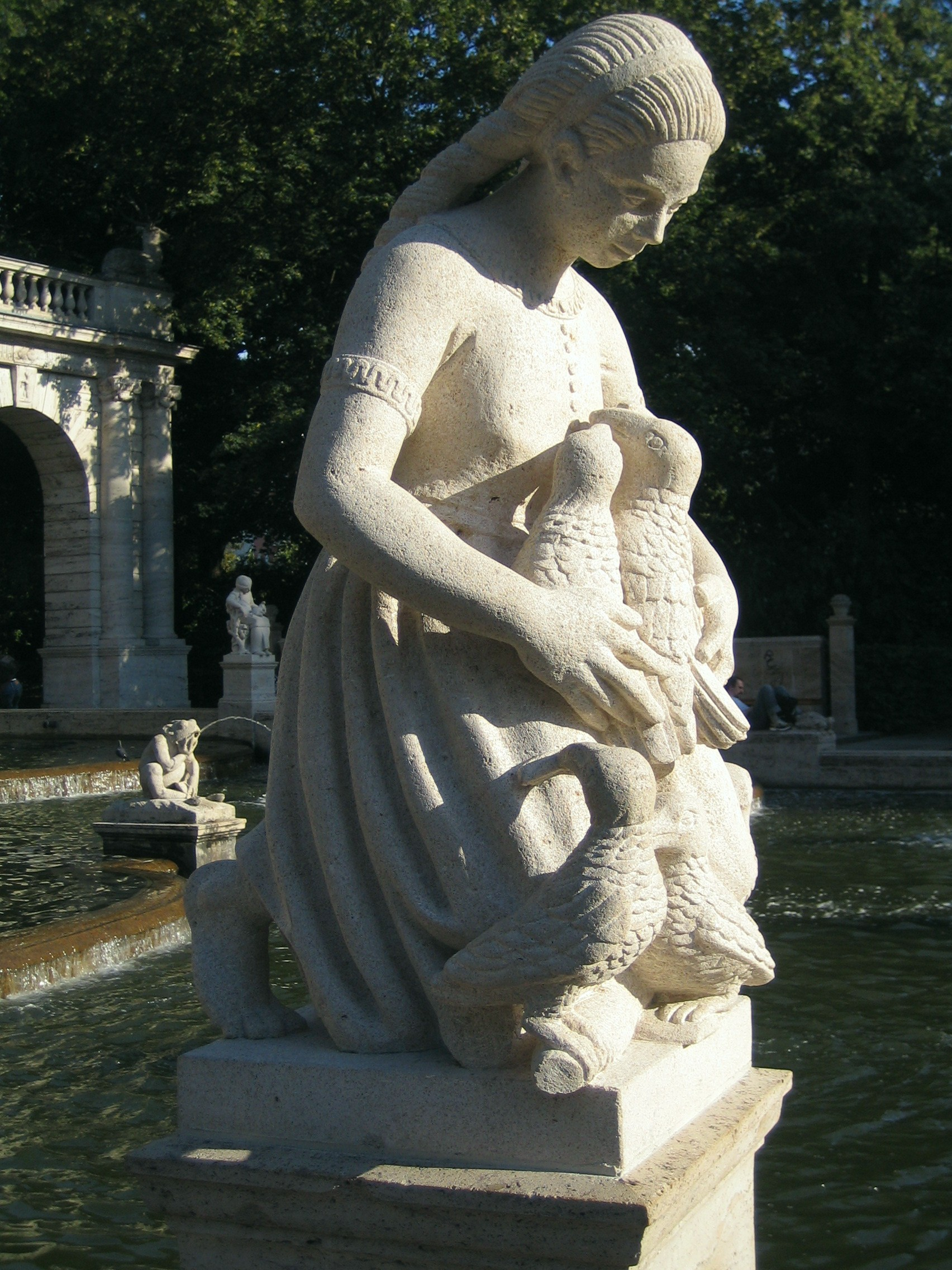
Die sieben Raben / The Seven Ravens

=== Death ===
Taschner died suddenly on 25 November 1913 in Mitterndorf near Dachau.

== Most important works ==
- 1895: war memorial in the town cemetery in Schweinfurt
- 1896–1904: architectural sculpture for the Wertheim department store on Leipziger Platz in Berlin-Mitte (architect Alfred Messel)
- 1901/1902: Parsifal zu Pferde, Bronze-Kleinplastik, 37 x 18 x 38 cm. Staatliche Museen zu Berlin – Preußischer Kulturbesitz, Nationalgalerie
- 1904: Illustrations for Ludwig Thomas story Der heilige Hies
- 1904–1911: Participation in the architectural sculpture for the Stadthaus in Berlin-Mitte
- 1904–1914: Crown silver
- 1907: Gustav-Freytag-Brunnen on the Liebichshöhe in Breslau
- 1908: Four reliefs an der Puppenbrücke (Lübeck)
- 1910: Fischerbuberl-Brunnen on the Wiener Platz in München
- 1911–1912: Statuettes for Märchenbrunnen in Berlin-Friedrichshain
- 1904: Illustrations for the Brothers Grimms fairy tales
- Illustrations for Johann Karl August Musäus' Die Nymphe des Brunnens

== Influence and honors ==
- After his death, Ludwig Thoma and the art critic Heilmeyer put out a commemorative volume, which appeared 1921.
- In Bad Kissingen and Lohr am Main there is a road named after him "Ignatius-Taschner-Straße".
- In Dachau, there is the Ignaz-Taschner-Gymnasium.
- In Mitterdorf near Dachau there is also an "Ignatius-Taschner-Straße".

== Literature ==
- Norbert Götz, Ursel Berger (Hrsg.): Ignatius Taschner. Ein Künstlerleben zwischen Jugendstil und Neoklassizismus. (Katalog anlässlich der gleichnamigen Ausstellung im Münchner Stadtmuseum 1992) München, Klinckhardt und Biermann 1992. ISBN 3-7814-0321-1
- Ursula Sautmann: Hommage an Taschner. Porträt Ignatz Fischer-Kerli und der Jugendstilkünstler. In: Süddeutsche Zeitung, Lokalausgabe Fürstenfeldbruck, 24 May 2008.
- Taschner, Ignatius in: Thieme-Becker: Allgemeines Lexikon der Bildenden Künstler von der Antike bis zur Gegenwart. Bd. 40 (Ta-Tie) zusammen mit Hans Vollmer (Hrsg.): Allgemeines Lexikon der bildenden Künstler des XX. Jahrhunderts. E. A. Seemann (CD-ROM), Leipzig 2008. ISBN 978-3-86502-177-9 (S. 60)
