= Memorial to Polish Soldiers and German Anti-Fascists =

Memorial in Berlin, Germany

Coordinates: 52°31′43.56″N 13°26′15.48″E

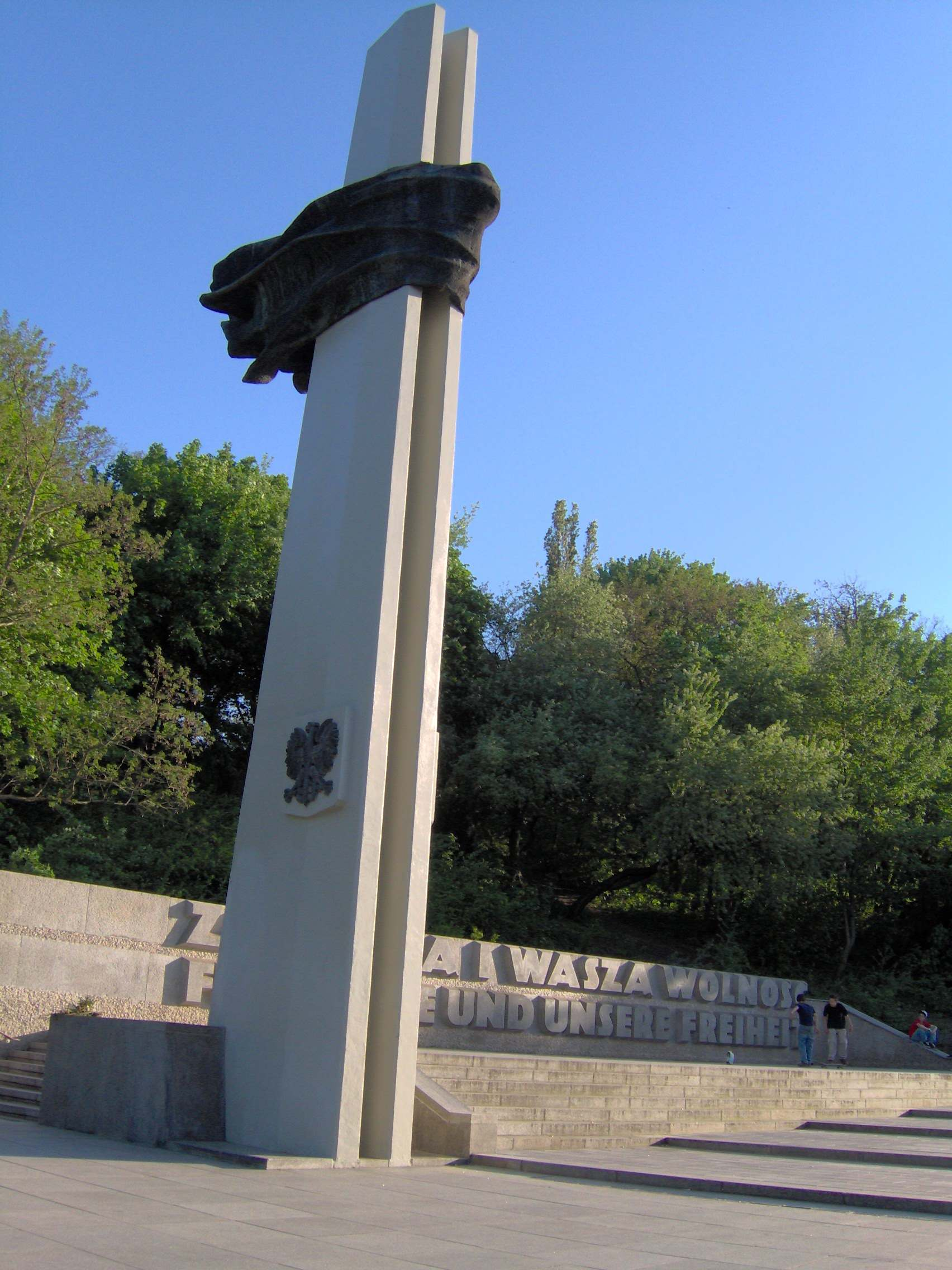
The twin columns symbolize the joint struggle of Poles and Germans against fascism

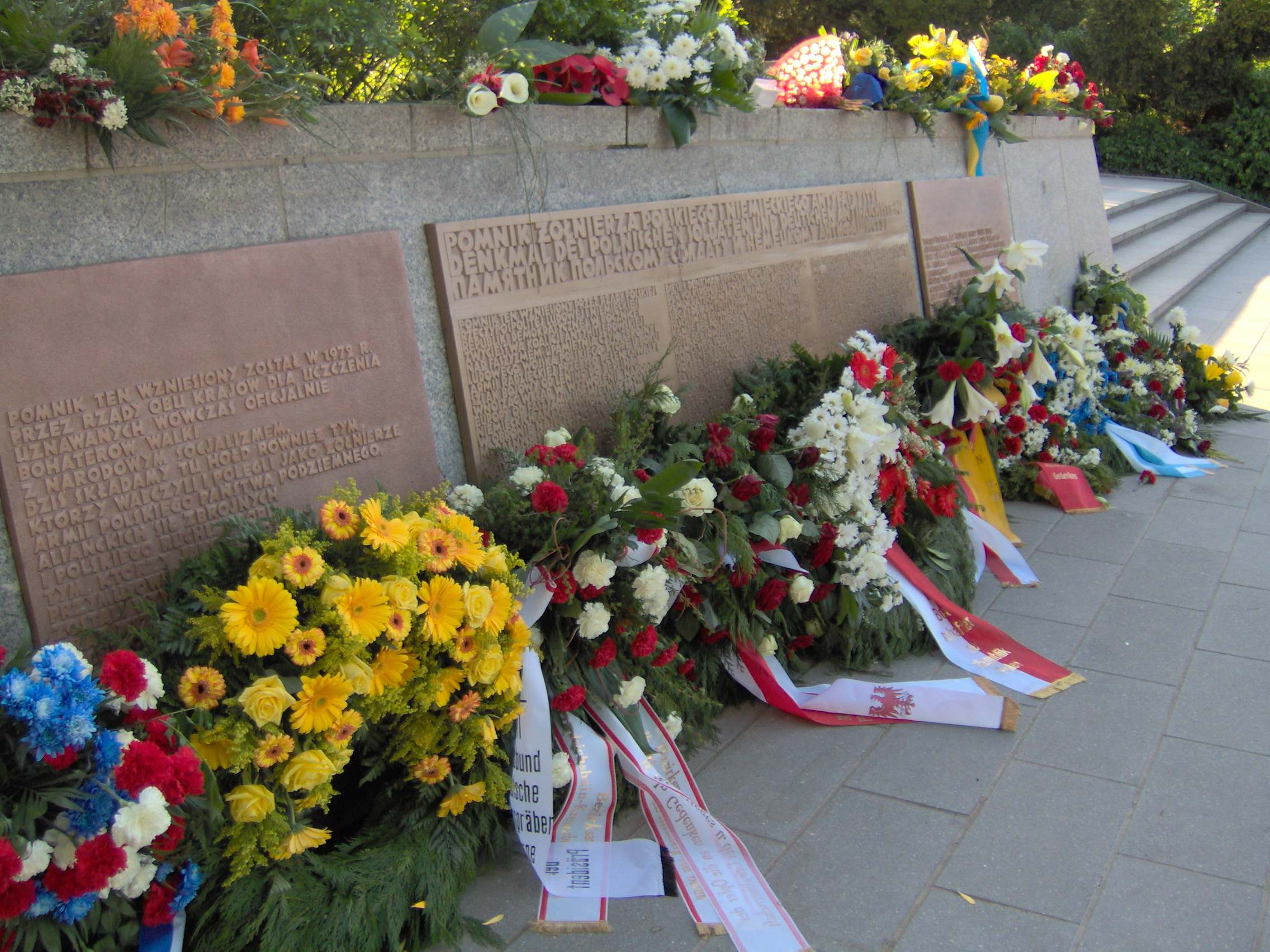
Memorial wreaths left before the monument on May 8, 2006

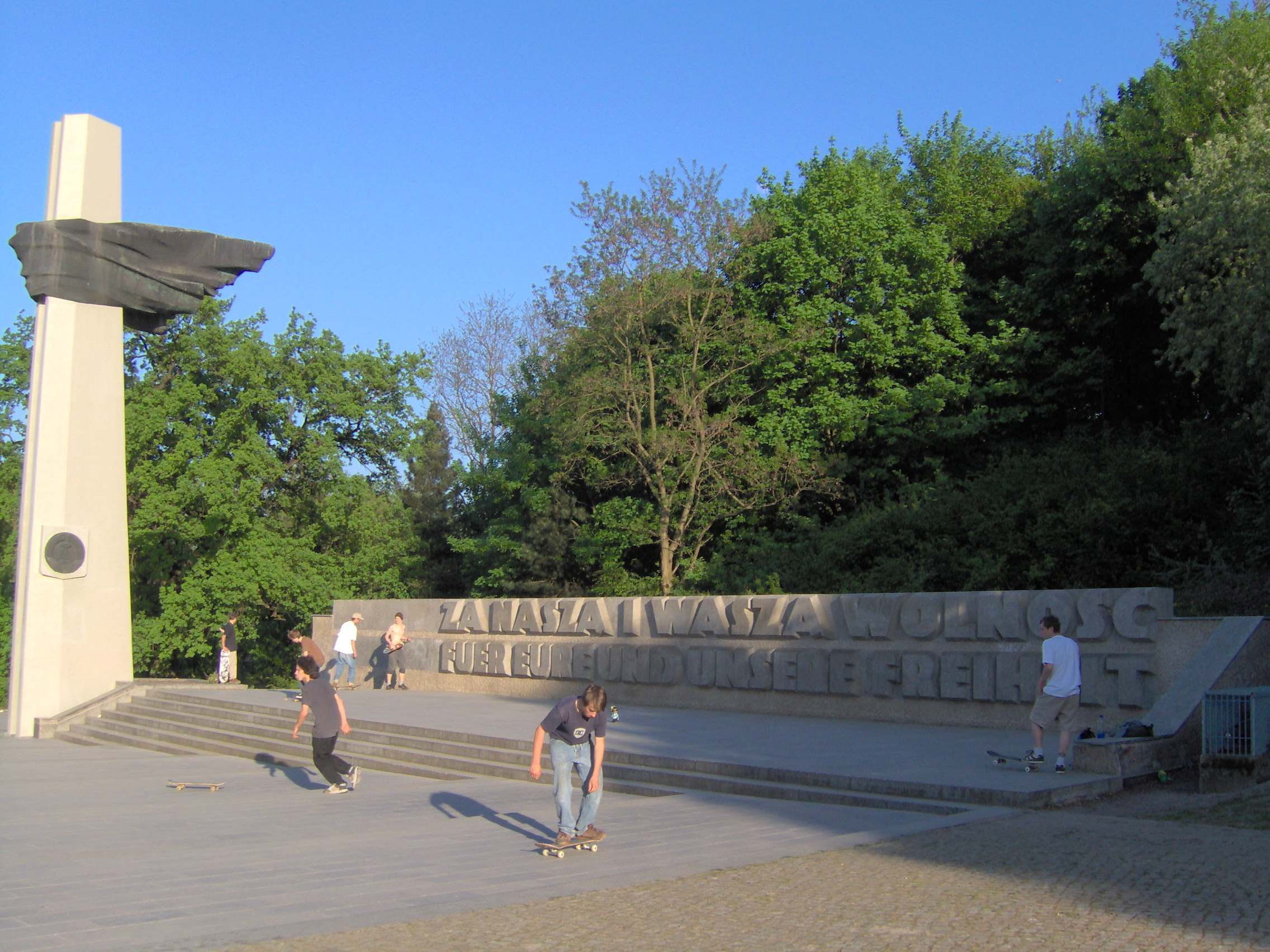
Skateboarders in front of the slogan "For your freedom and ours". Note the East German Coat of arms on the left side of the picture on the monument.

The Memorial to Polish Soldiers and German Anti-Fascists (German: Denkmal des polnischen Soldaten und deutschen Antifaschisten; Polish: Pomnik żołnierza polskiego i niemieckiego antyfaszysty) is a war memorial in Berlin, dedicated in 1972. Built by the German Democratic Republic during the division of Germany, it is today the principal German monument to the Polish soldiers who died in World War II, as well as an important monument to the German resistance.

== Description and history ==
The monument is located in Volkspark Friedrichshain, in the borough of Friedrichshain in former East Berlin. It was conceived at a time of improving relations between East Germany and Poland as a monument to the cooperation between the communist Polish People's Army and German communists in the struggle against fascism. The monument of gray Silesian granite was designed by the Polish sculptors Zofia Wolska and Tadeusz Łodziana and the Germans Arnd Wittig and Günther Merkel. Its centerpiece is a pair of parallel 15-meter stone columns (which are actually a single structure) united by a bronze flag. The monument area is in the foot of a hill, and is set off with a wall bearing the motto of Tadeusz Kościuszko, "For your freedom and ours," in Polish (Za waszą i naszą wolność) and German (Für eure und unsere Freiheit), and a relief showing figures of a Polish and Red Army soldier together with a German resistance fighter. Below the columns is the dedicatory plaque, in Polish, German, and Russian, where wreath-laying ceremonies take place.

The monument was rededicated in 1995 following German reunification to include non-communist Polish soldiers and victims of the Nazis, as well as all German resistance movements, and plaques in Polish and German were added explaining this. The monument was left otherwise unchanged, and the columns still bear the communist-era coat of arms of the People's Republic of Poland and the coat of arms of East Germany.

In recent years, concern mounted as to the amount of vandalism and graffiti inflicted on the monument. In 2004, a German company agreed to sponsor the maintenance of the monument. In 2005, the memorial was defaced with neo-Nazi slogans.

The monument is frequently used for skateboarding.

== See also ==
- Polish Secret State
- Polish contribution to World War II
- Red Orchestra
- German Resistance Memorial Center
