= Märchenbrunnen =

Fountain in Volkspark Friedrichshain, Berlin, Germany

Coordinates: 52°31′41″N 13°25′37″E

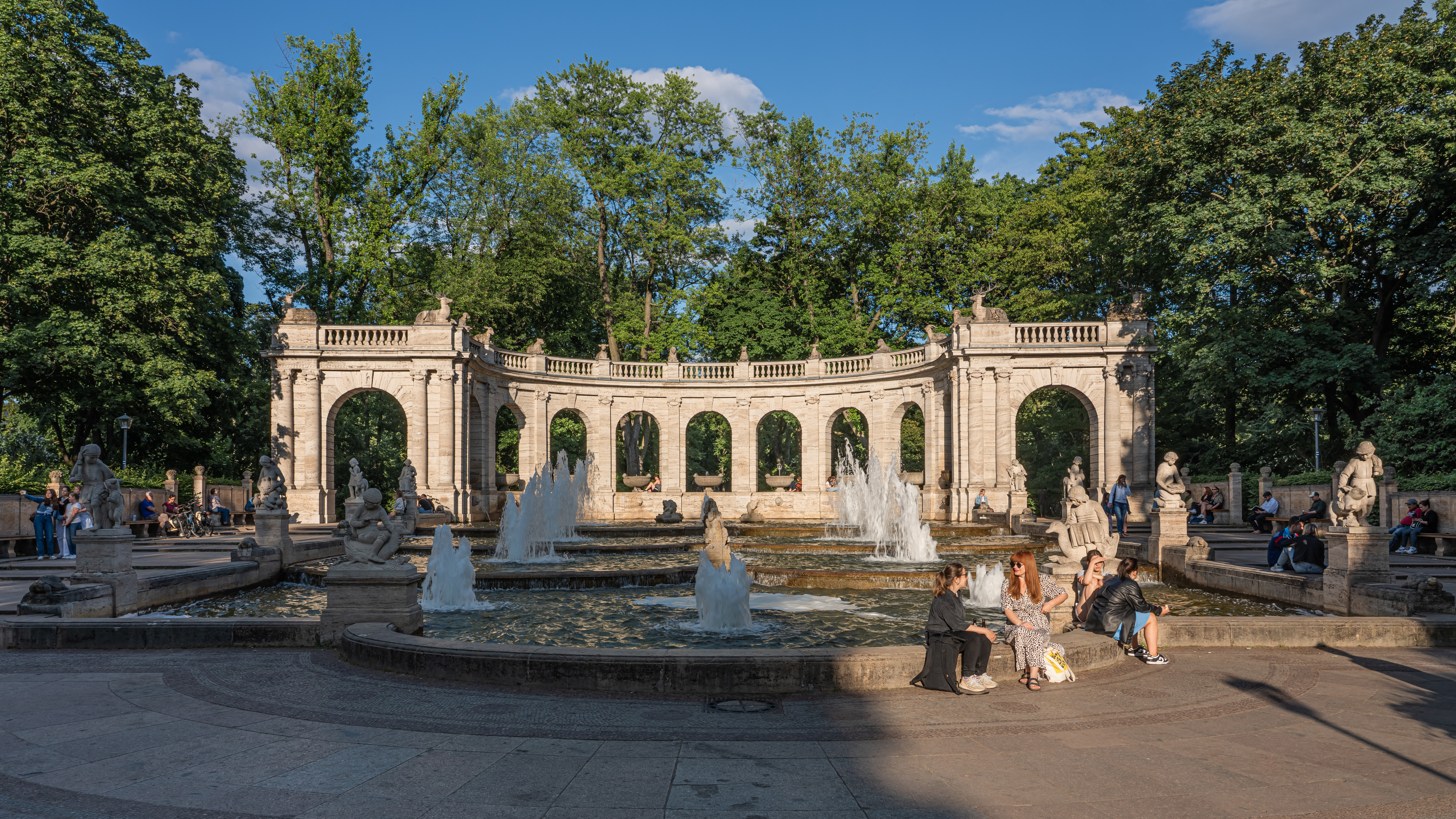
The fountain

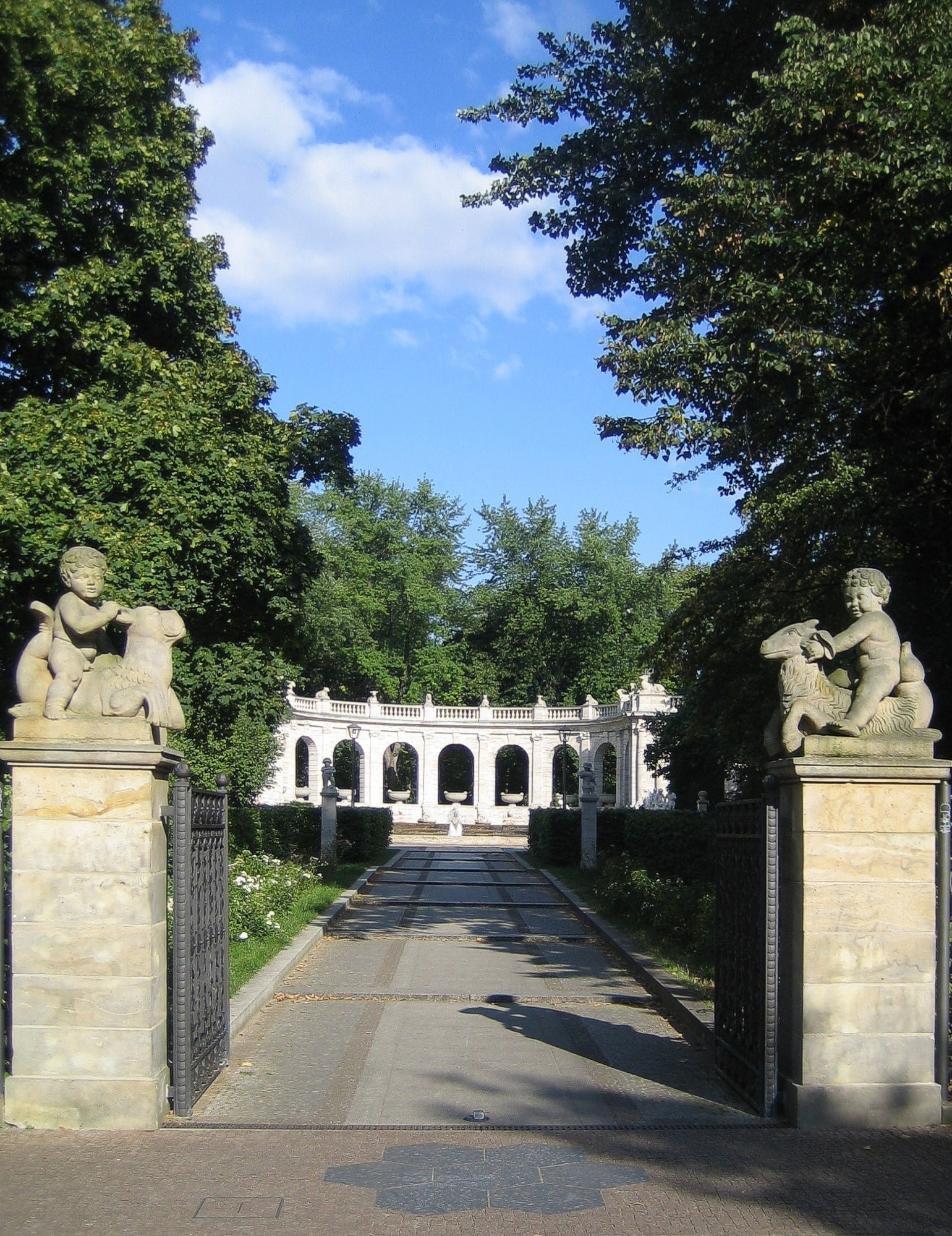
The main gate to the fountain

The Märchenbrunnen (simply the "fountain of fairy tales") is located in the Volkspark Friedrichshain in Berlin, Germany. In 1893 the authorities of Berlin issued the artistic entrance to the People's Park Friedrichshain. The fountain of fairy tales was commissioned by the National Park and later designed by Ludwig Hoffmann. Hoffmann put forward the idea of a fountain in the park to depict fairy tales. Hoffmann describes this in his memoirs.

== Design ==
=== Overall Plan ===
The overall designs for the fountain complex came from architect and longtime Berlin city councilor, Ludwig Hoffmann. The centerpiece of the design is a 34 by 54 meters (112 ft × 177 ft) fountain in Neo-Baroque style. The fountain basin is made up of four cascading waterfalls which contain one large and nine smaller individual fountains, as well as seven water-spouting frog figurines, one of which is denoted as being the Frog Prince. On the east side, the cascading pool is enclosed by a semicircular arcade; a succession of arches. In the center of the nine arches is a large stone bowl which is decorated with sculptures of dogs' heads. Above the arcade is a complete gallery containing sculptures of various animals from folklore and literary fairy tales. Behind the arcade is fountain called the Dolphin Fountain (German: Delphinbrunnen), which has a diameter of 8 meters (26 feet). Designed with concentric circles, the rim of the pool is adorned by sculptures of children with fairy-tale animals. It was created by sculptor Georg Wrba.

=== Sculptures ===
Throughout his career, Ludwig Hoffmann put special emphasis on sculpted ornamentation on his numerous buildings. As he found that this aspect of architecture was traditionally inadequately represented in northern Germany - and especially in Berlin - he often collaborated with three sculptors from southern Germany: Ignatius Taschner, Georg Wrba, and Josef Rauch. From these sculptors came the extensive sculpture collection of the Märchenbrunnen, a total of 106 figurative or purely decorative stone sculptures. Taschner created the central motifs, 10 sculptures around the edge of the fountain, through which he interpreted nine well-known fairy tales by the Brothers Grimm: Hansel and Gretel (with two sculptures based on the lesser-known second version of the fairy tale from 1819, in which the rescued children are carried home over water by a helpful duck), Puss in Boots, Hans in Luck, The Seven Ravens, Cinderella, Little Red Riding Hood, Brother and Sister, Snow White and the Seven Dwarfs and Sleeping Beauty. Wrba received a commission for four Hermas, which are found in narrow, hedge-lined pathways to the side of the fairytale fountain (they depict an ogre, the Riesentochter [giant daughter], the Rübezahl and Old Mother Frost), also for six groups of children placed in alcoves around the Dolphin Fountain and for various other decorative elements. Josef Rauch supplied the 14 marble sculptures depicting game animals found on the fountain arcade.

One of the seven Snow White dwarves bears a clear resemblance to the painter Adolph Menzel. This was a silent protest against Kaiser Wilhelm II’s decision to not give the artist a monument after his death, citing a disagreement between the two over Menzel's stark depictions of the harsh conditions within Germany's burgeoning industry as a reason. However, this interpretation is doubtful, for, on the other hand, Wilhelm II had highly valued Menzel's works on Prussian history and even ordered a state funeral for the painter, in which the emperor himself took part.

== History ==
=== Planning and construction ===
In his memoirs, Ludwig Hoffmann described the lengthy development history of the project. Since 1893 construction on this site had been intended. When taking office as councilor in 1896, Hoffmann found plans by the municipal art commission for a decorative piece of architecture. He rejected these designs and instead developed the idea of a fairytale after he had seen numerous children playing at the location during a tour of the property. The first draft version was published in 1901 and presented at the Große Berliner Kunstausstellung (Great Berlin Art Exhibition). The Kaiser welcomed the plan but wished to make some changes of his own.

Thus began a years-long power dispute between the Kaiser (who had, through the chief of police, the power to approve or reject any plans to build on Berlin's squares or streets) and the municipal bodies (who were responsible for buildings on park terrain). Eventually, Hoffmann decided to avoid a direct confrontation with the Kaiser, but in received criticism from the liberal press and parts of the city council due to his compliance with the Kaiser's wishes. In the meantime, he revised the design. Contracts for the concrete construction could not be granted until 1907. The total costs, including gardening, roadworks landscaping, were, according to Hoffmann, 960,000 marks (purchasing power adjusted to today's currency: around 4,874,000 euros). On 15 June 1913, the 25th anniversary of Kaiser Wilhelm II's accession to the throne, the grounds were handed over to the public. In 1901 the planning for the fountain began, along with the design. Ludwig Hoffmann paid serious attention to the sculpture. In 1905 the planning was complete, and Hoffmann presented his sketches and his creation of fairy tale characters which were created by Joseph Rauh, Ignatius Tashner and Georg Vrba. The grand opening of the fountain was held on 15 June 1913 and the major works on the fountain were from 1907 to 1913.

In around 1905	Postcard in 1913

Puss in boots	The cascade composition	Hans in Luck. Sculpture I.

The ensemble is 90 by 172 metres (295 by 564 ft) and the main part of the complex is 34 by 54 metres (112 by 177 ft) and is made in the style of neo—Baroque. The main part of the ensemble is called pool water and was constructed on four flat stages of the cascade, and includes one large and nine small fountains. It also features figures of seven frogs which produce a jet of water. One of the frogs was used in The Frog Princess, a fairy tale. The sculptures are made of limestone. On the east side of the pond is a closed semicircular cascade arcade; a succession of arches. In the centre of the nine arches there is a large stone bowl which is decorated with sculptures of dogs' heads. Above the arcade there is a complete gallery with sculptures of various animals from folk and literary tales.

Behind the arcades there is a round fountain called the Dolphin (German: Delphinbrunnen) which has a diameter of 8 metres (26 ft). This contains circles which are made out of sandstone and four sculptural groups which represent children and skiers on the dolphin. This was created by sculptor Georg Vrba.

The fountain is decorated with well-known fairy tale characters, such as the Brothers Grimm, Hansel and Gretel, Puss in Boots, Cinderella, Little Red Riding Hood, Snow White, Sleeping Beauty and medieval legends such as the Rubezahl.

=== Destruction and restoration ===
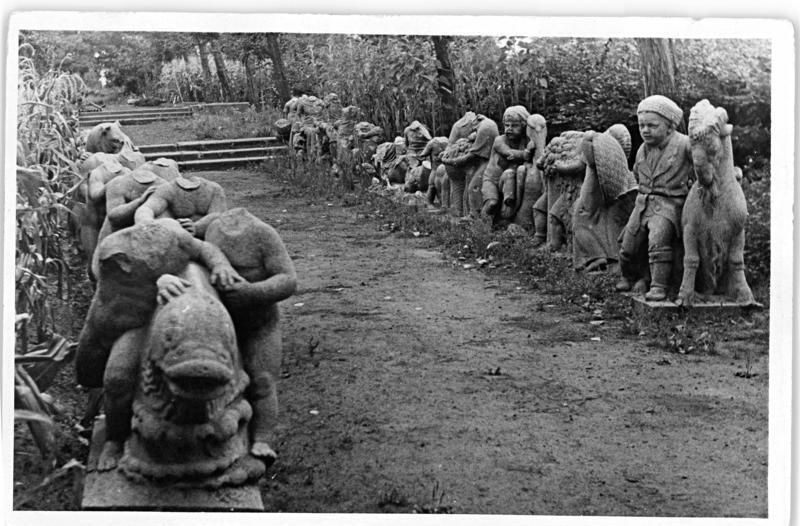
Rescued Sculptures. 1950

The Märchenbrunnen and the Volkspark Friedrichshain as a whole were severely damaged in 1945 by hostilities towards the end of the Second World War. After the end of the war, most of the sculptures had disappeared. It was not until 1950 that they were rediscovered behind a high wall in a vegetable garden in the district of Friedrichshain, many of them badly damaged. In the years 1950-1951 the Berlin city council worked on the restoration of the fountain complex. Instead of the original fairy-tale sculptures, rough copies were installed and the surrounding gardens restored to a simpler design. Further steps for the restoration of destroyed figures and sculptures followed in the years 1972/1973 and 1982/1983.

After German reunification in 1990, vandalism became a recurring problem. Sculptures and figures were damaged or removed, and graffiti on many parts of the architecture marred the overall picture of the fountain and its gardens. In 2005, a comprehensive, landmark restoration project began. 90% of the costs, around 1.3 million euros, were paid by the state of Berlin, the federal government, and the European Union, with the remainder donated by private sponsors. The first phase of construction was completed on May 24, 2007, and the entire complex has been accessible to the public since July 2007. A fence and night-time access barrier were installed around the area of the Märchenbrunnen to prevent future vandalism.

Sculptures of different characters
Little Red Riding Hood	Cinderella	Sleeping Beauty

Hansel	Brother and Sister	Gretel

Snow White with three dwarves	Rubezahl	The Seven Ravens

== Bibliography ==
- Koch, Günter (22 October 1981). Der Märchenbrunnen — Kleinode der Großstadt (in German). Artikel in der Berliner Zeitung.
- Heimnerger, Bernd (30 June 1983). Wo Menzel als Zwerg bei Schneewittchen platziert ist (in German). Artikel in der Gewerkschaftszeitung Tribüne.
- Pfeiffer, Rolf (2004). Am Brunnen vor dem Königstore (in German). Artikel in der Zeitschrift Die Wochenpost.
- Dehio, Georg (HRSG.); et al. (2000). Handbuch der deutschen Kunstdenkmäler Berlin (in German). München, Berlin. ISBN 3-422-03071-9.
- Feustel, Jan (1994). Spaziergänge in Friedrichshain (in German). Berlin. ISBN 3-7759-0357-7.
- Luise-Berlin (2012). "Märchenbrunnen" (in German). Luise-Berlin. Archived from the original on August 7, 2010.
- Verlag, Mann (1996). Ludwig Hoffmann: Lebenserinnerungen eines Architekten (in German). Berlin. ISBN 3-7861-1388-2.
- Stadtentwicklung (2012). "Volkspark Friedrichshain" (in German). Stadtentwicklung. Archived from the original on 2012-03-06.
- Stadtentwicklung; Gauen; Brunnen (2011). "Delphinbrunnen". Stadtentwicklung. Archived from the original on 2012-08-14.
