= Ludwig Hoffmann (architect) =

German architect

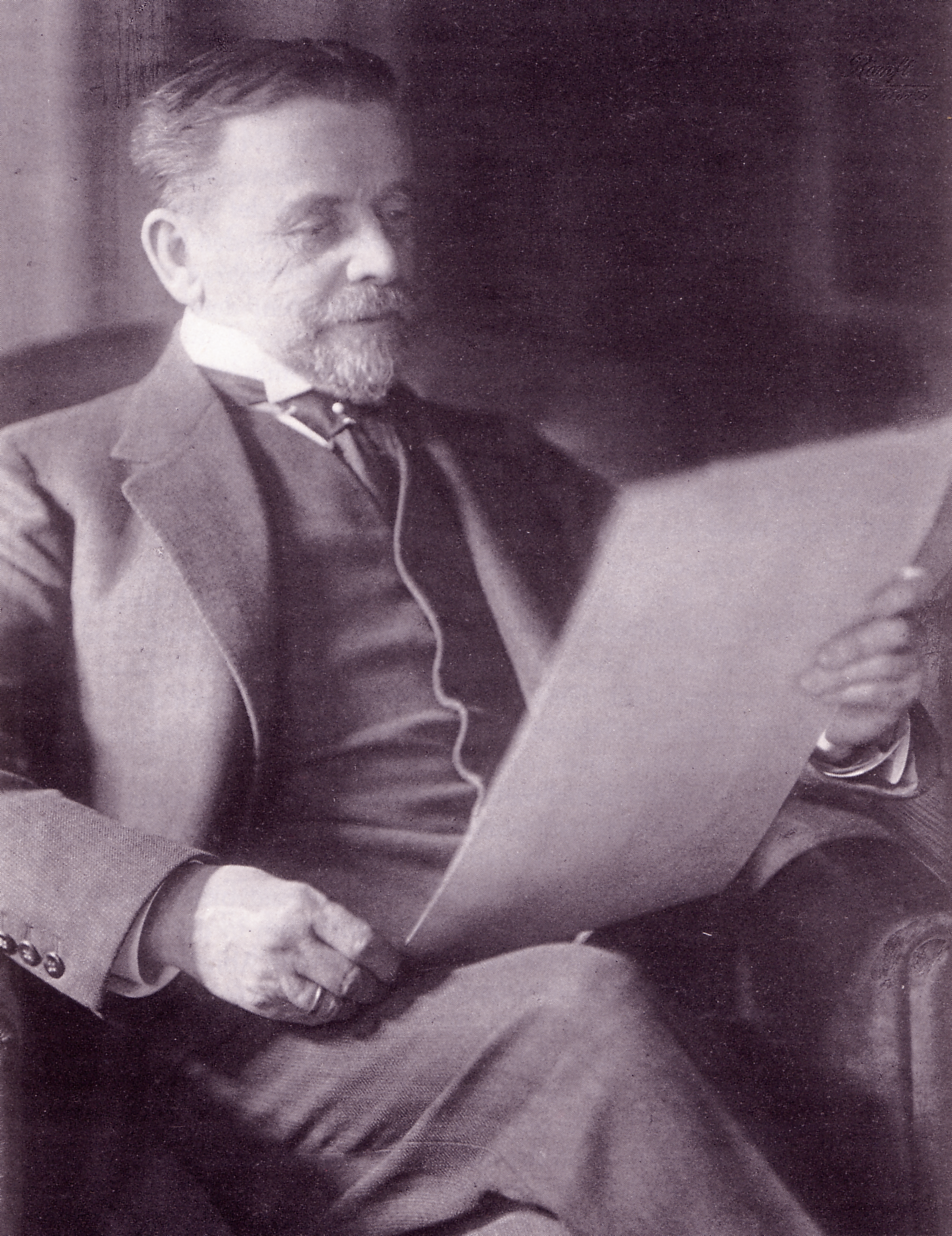
- Ludwig Hoffmann
- Born: Ludwig Ernst Emil Hoffmann; 30 July 1852; Darmstadt, Hesse
- Died: 11 November 1932 (aged 80); Berlin
- Occupation: Architect
- Awards: Honorary citizen of Berlin

Ludwig Ernst Emil Hoffmann (30 July 1852 – 11 November 1932) was a German architect and was one of the most famous architects of Berlin.

== Life and career ==
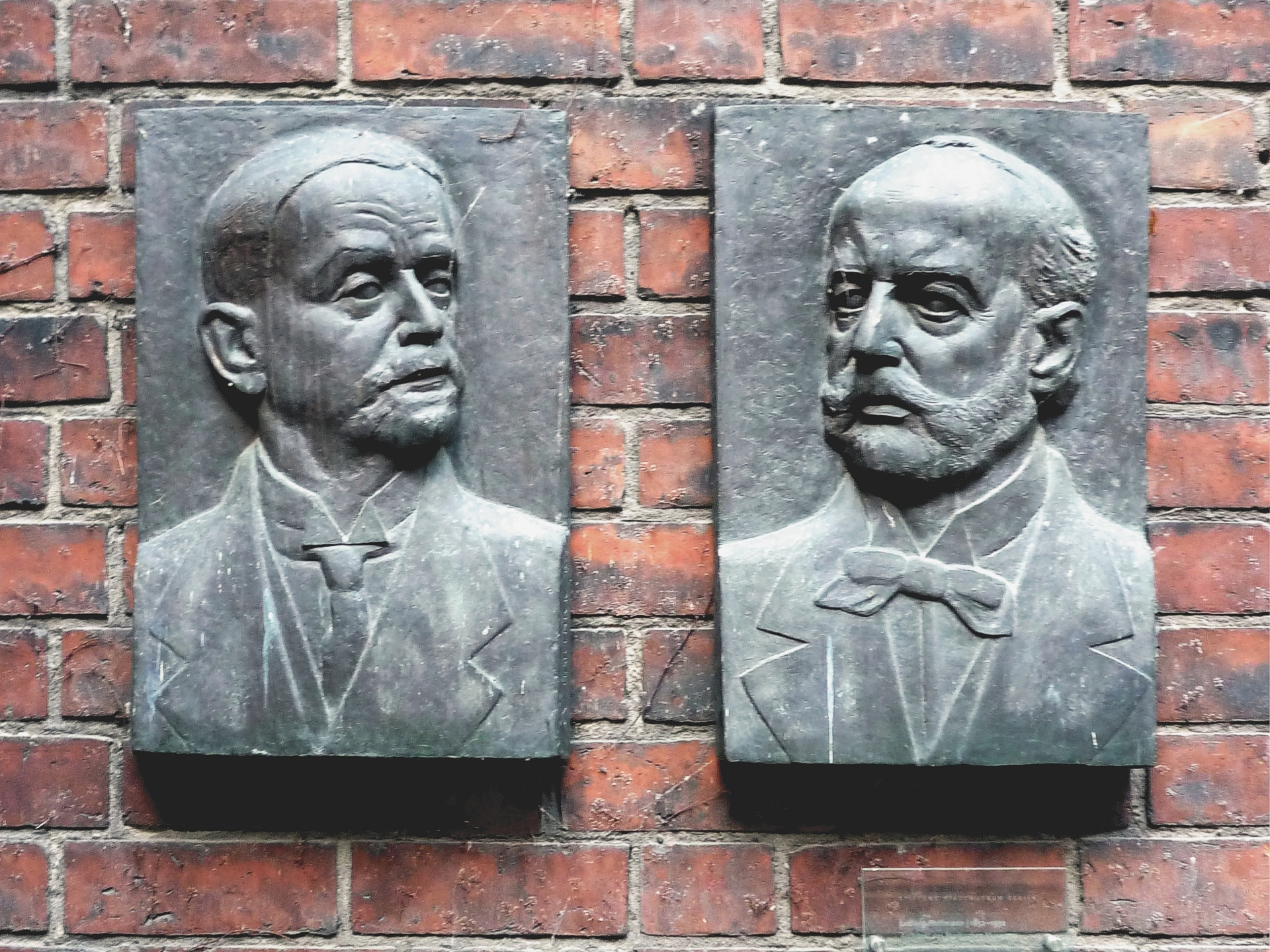
Portraits of Hoffmann and Ernst Friedel by Evelyn Hartnick at the Märkisches Museum

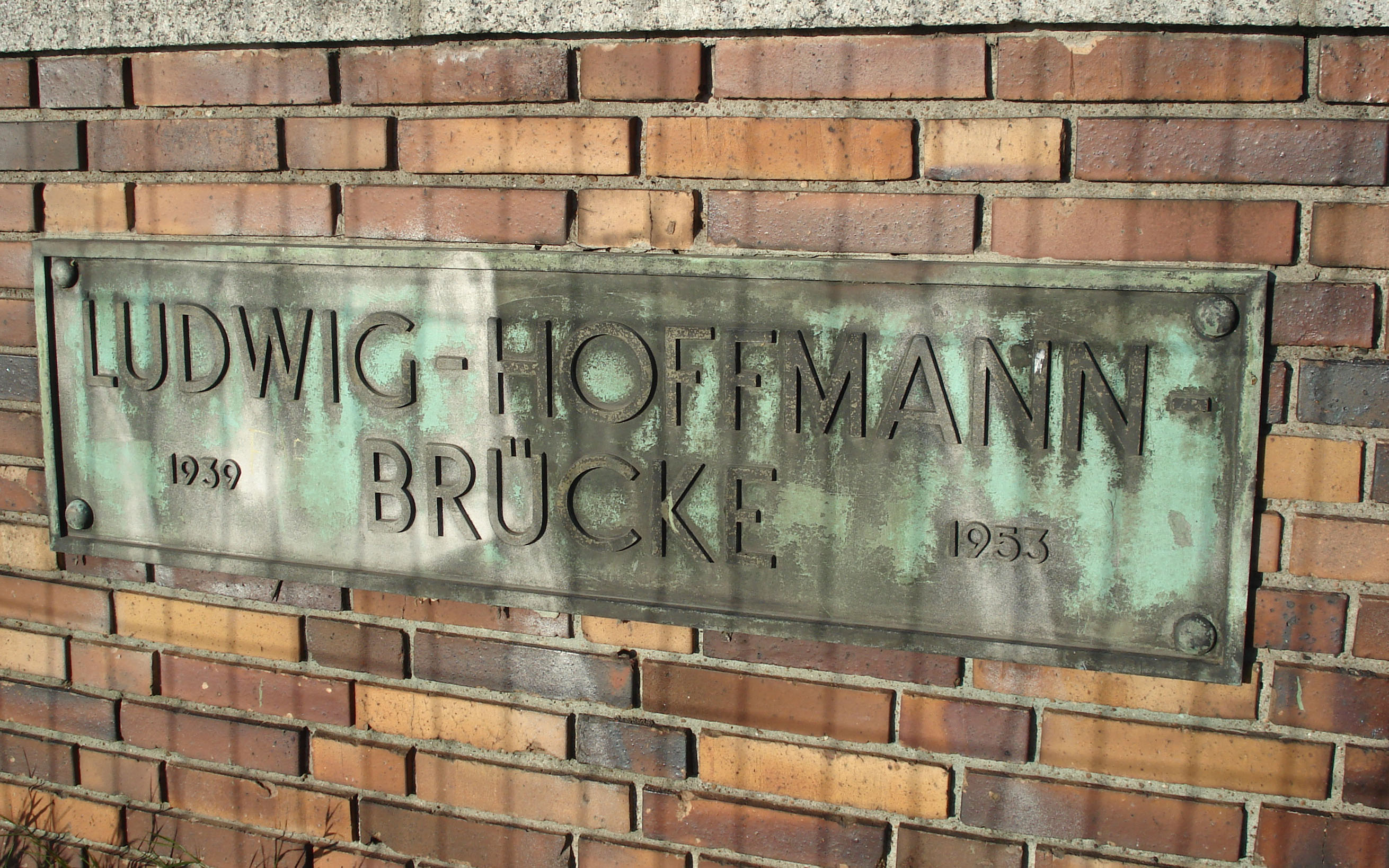
Sign on the Ludwig Hoffmann Bridge in Moabit

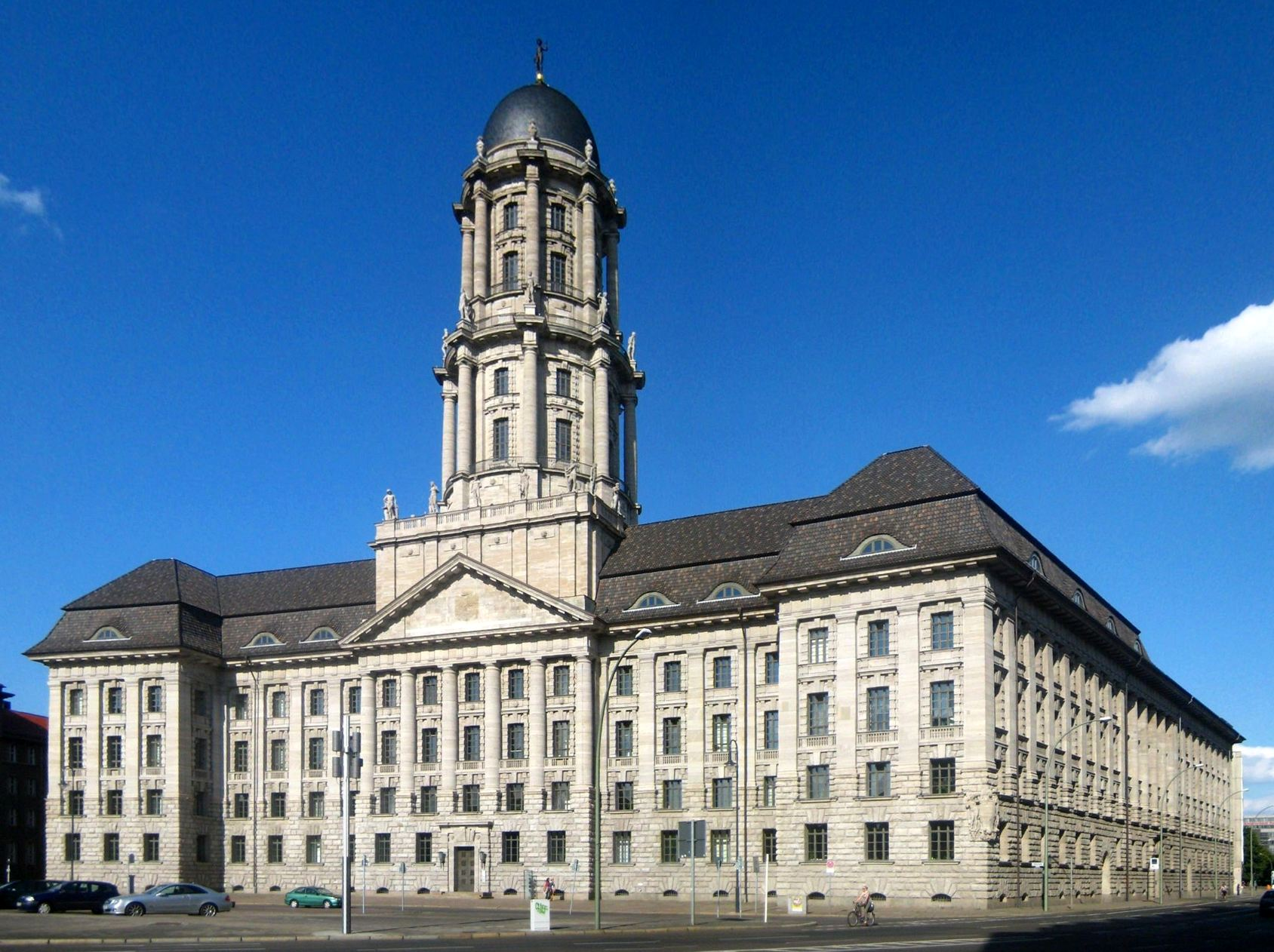
Altes Stadthaus in Berlin

Ludwig Hoffmann was born in Darmstadt and educated at the Kunstakademie Kassel (Kassel Academy of Art) and the Bauakademie (Academy of Architecture) in Berlin. In 1879, after passing the first state examination, Hoffmann began working for the government of Berlin as a construction foreman under Franz Heinrich Schwechten. His architectural career began in 1880 when he and Peter Dybwad, both unknowns, won the competition to design the Reich Court building in Leipzig against 118 other entries. In 1895, the year it was completed, he returned to Berlin and that June married Marie Weisbach, a banker's daughter.

In 1896, Hoffmann became Stadtbaurat—director of urban planning and construction—for Berlin. He served for 28 years until 1924 (mandatory retirement age being 72) and is now regarded as the most important holder of the position.

Under his leadership 111 facilities were built, including over 300 buildings. He designed the new administration building for the city of Berlin, now known as the Altes Stadthaus (1902—1911). He designed the Märkisches Museum (1899—1904), the museum of Berlin and the Mark Brandenburg. With Alfred Messel, he designed the built version of the Pergamon Museum on Museum Island (1910—1930). In addition he designed bridges, fountains, public baths, schools of every kind, orphanages, hospital complexes, cemeteries, private villas, and apartment buildings. In his memoirs, he describes the long history of work on the Märchenbrunnen (fountain of fairy tales) for the Volkspark Friedrichshain, the first public park in Berlin. Hoffmann had a significant impact on the urban development of Berlin both through his own designs and as a judge for many architectural competitions, although some of his projects were not constructed due to the outbreak of World War I, many were destroyed in World War II, and others were later demolished. An archive of many of his designs is kept at the Architecture Museum of Technische Universität Berlin.

=== Honors and criticism ===
In 1906 Ludwig Hoffmann was awarded the title of Privy Councillor and an honorary doctorate from the Technische Hochschule Darmstadt. In the same year he was elected to membership of the Prussian Academy of Arts. In 1917 he received a second honorary doctorate, from the Vienna University of Technology. Upon his retirement in 1924 he was awarded honorary citizenship of Berlin. A primary school in Friedrichshain (which he built), a hospital in Pankow, a bridge in Moabit, and a street in the Sellerhausen section of Leipzig bear his name.

Hoffmann's work was long out of favor for its historicism, but is now recognized as an important part of the effort to accommodate Berlin's rapid growth prior to World War I. As early as 1956, Ludwig Mies van der Rohe admitted that he was wrong to dismiss Hoffmann's style as "old-fashioned", realizing that Hoffmann’s work was actually high-quality and essential to Berlin’s development.

== Bibliography ==
- Dehio, Georg; Bollé, Michael; Badstübner-Gröger, Sibylle, eds. (2000). Handbuch der deutschen Kunstdenkmäler Berlin (in German) (2nd ed.). Munich: Deutscher Kunstverlag. ISBN 978-3-422-03071-8.
- Döhl, Dörte (2004). Ludwig Hoffmann. Bauen für Berlin 1896—1924 (in German). Tübingen: Wasmuth. ISBN 978-3-8030-0629-5.
- Hoffmann, Ludwig (1983). Schäche, Wolfgang (ed.). Lebenserinnerungen eines Architekten. Bauwerke und Kunstdenkmäler von Berlin Beiheft (in German). Vol. 10. Berlin: Mann. ISBN 978-3-7861-1388-1.
- Hoffmann, Ludwig; Stahl, Fritz (1914). Ludwig Hoffmann. Berliner Architekturwelt Sonderhefte (in German). Vol. 14. Berlin: Ernst Wasmuth. OCLC 4320395.
- N., G—g (1904–1926). "Hoffmann, Ernst Ludwig Emil". Nordisk familjebok (in Swedish). Project Runeberg.
- Reichhardt, Hans J.; Schäche, Wolfgang, eds. (1986). Ludwig Hoffmann in Berlin: die Wiederentdeckung eines Architekten: eine Ausstellung des Landesarchivs Berlin, 11. November 1986 bis 27. Februar 1987. Ausstellungskataloge des Landesarchivs Berlin (in German). Vol. 5. Berlin: Transit. ISBN 978-3-88747-033-3.
- Topfstedt, Thomas (2001). "Das Reichsgerichtsgebäude in Leipzig—vom Entwurf zum ausgeführten Bau". In Schmidt-Recla, Adrian; Schumann, Eva; Theisen, Frank (eds.). Sachsen im Spiegel des Rechts: ius commune propriumque (in German). Cologne: Böhlau. pp. 1–8. ISBN 978-3-412-07301-5.
- Viergutz, Volker (2001), "Das hätten wir in der Brüderstraße uns auch nicht träumen lassen. Anmerkungen zur Freundschaft von Ludwig Hoffmann und Alfred Messel", Berlin in Geschichte und Gegenwart. Jahrbuch des Landesarchivs Berlin, p. 83, ISBN 978-3-7861-2414-6
- Zajonz, Michael (July 30, 2002). "Meister aller Klassen: Alleskönner: Eine Ausstellung ehrt Berlins bedeutendsten Stadtbaurat Ludwig Hoffmann zum 150. Geburtstag". Der Tagesspiegel (in German). (CAPTCHA)
