= Volkspark Friedrichshain =

Park in Berlin, Germany

Coordinates: 52°31′36″N 13°26′2″E

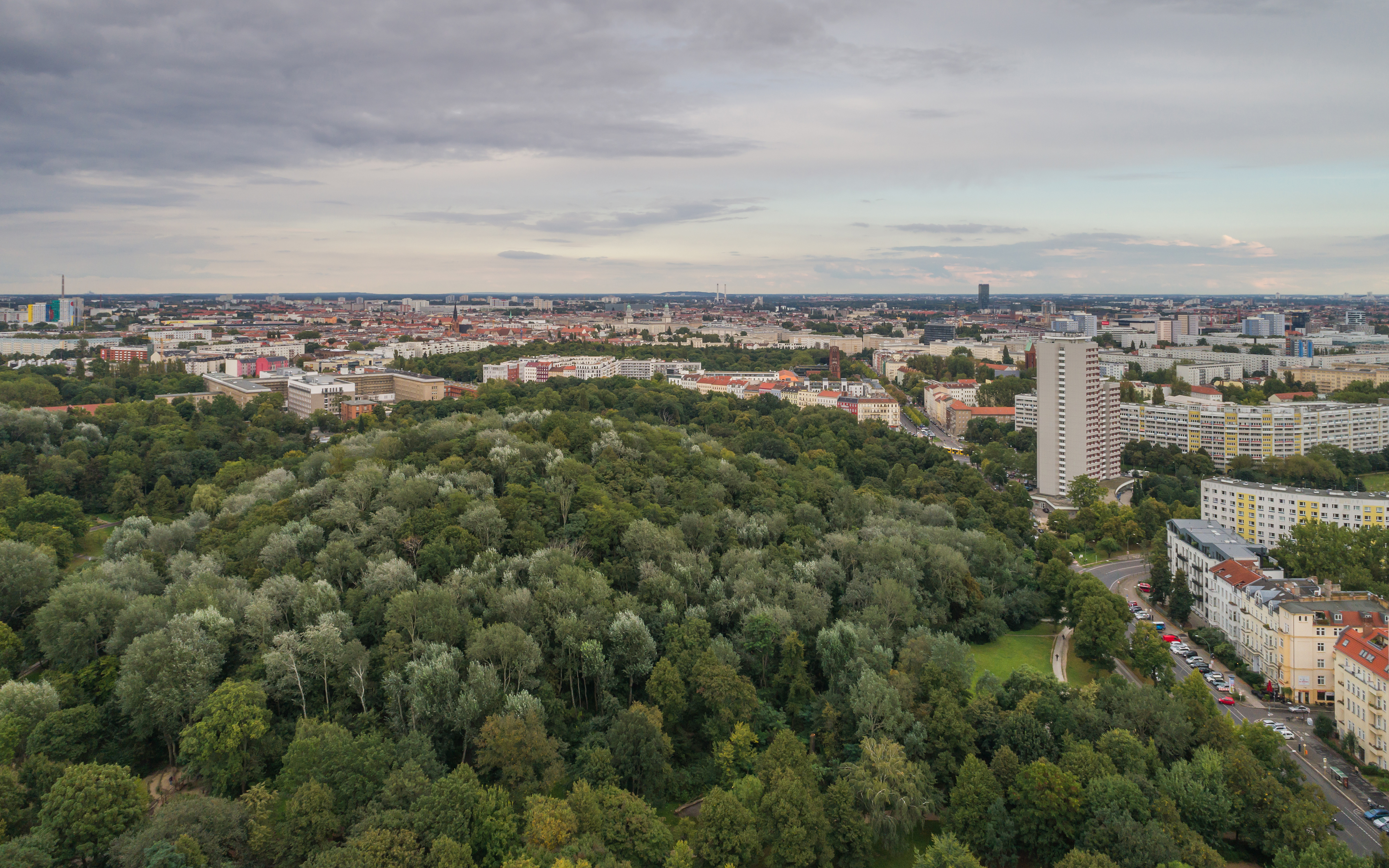
Aerial view of Volkspark Friedrichshain

Volkspark Friedrichshain (German pronunciation: [ˈfɔlkspaʁk ˈfʁiːdʁɪçsˌhaɪn]) is a large urban park on the border of the Berlin neighborhoods of Friedrichshain and Prenzlauer Berg. The oldest public park in Berlin, at 52 hectares, it is also the fourth-largest, after Tempelhofer Park (>300 hectares), Tiergarten (210 hectares), and Jungfernheide (146 hectares).

== History ==
The park was originally conceived by the landscape gardener Peter Joseph Lenné, and in 1840 the Berlin city council decided to construct it on the occasion of the centennial of Frederick the Great's ascension to the Prussian throne. The oldest parts of the park were laid out in 1846-1848 based on plans by Johann Heinrich Gustav Meyer, a landscape architect who held the post of city park director, and learned his craft in the botanical garden of Schöneberg. The park was constructed on the space of a former vineyard, and officially opened in 1848 with an area of 46 hectares.

=== Mid 19th Century - 1945 ===
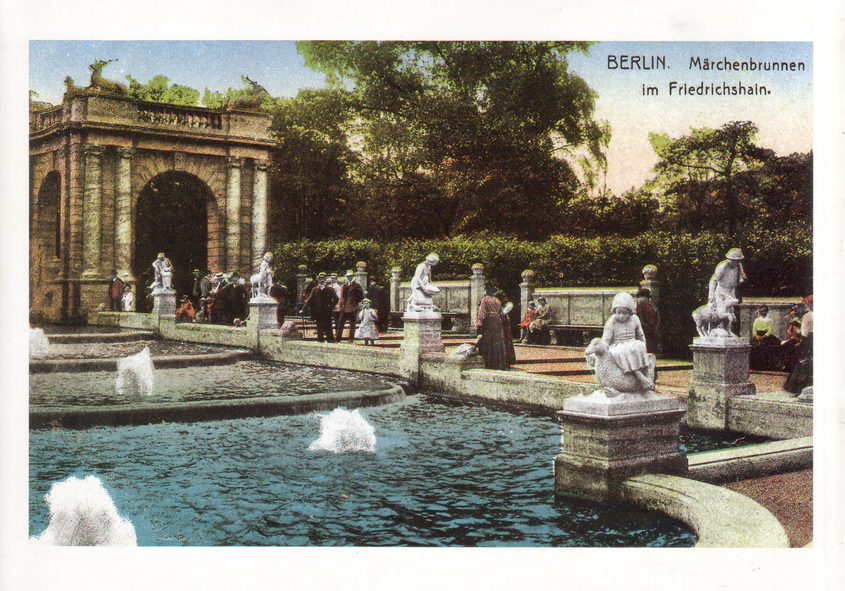
Märchenbrunnen (1913)

The size, shape, and layout of the park have changed over the intervening years. In 1848, the Friedhof der Märzgefallenen (a cemetery commemorating those who died in the March revolution) was created. Another of the earliest changes was due to the construction of Berlin's first urban hospital, Krankenhaus im Friedrichshain, which was built in 1868 to 1874 in the southeast part of the park. The hospital, which was designed by Martin Gropius and Heino Schmieden, was originally directed by the notable Rudolf Virchow.

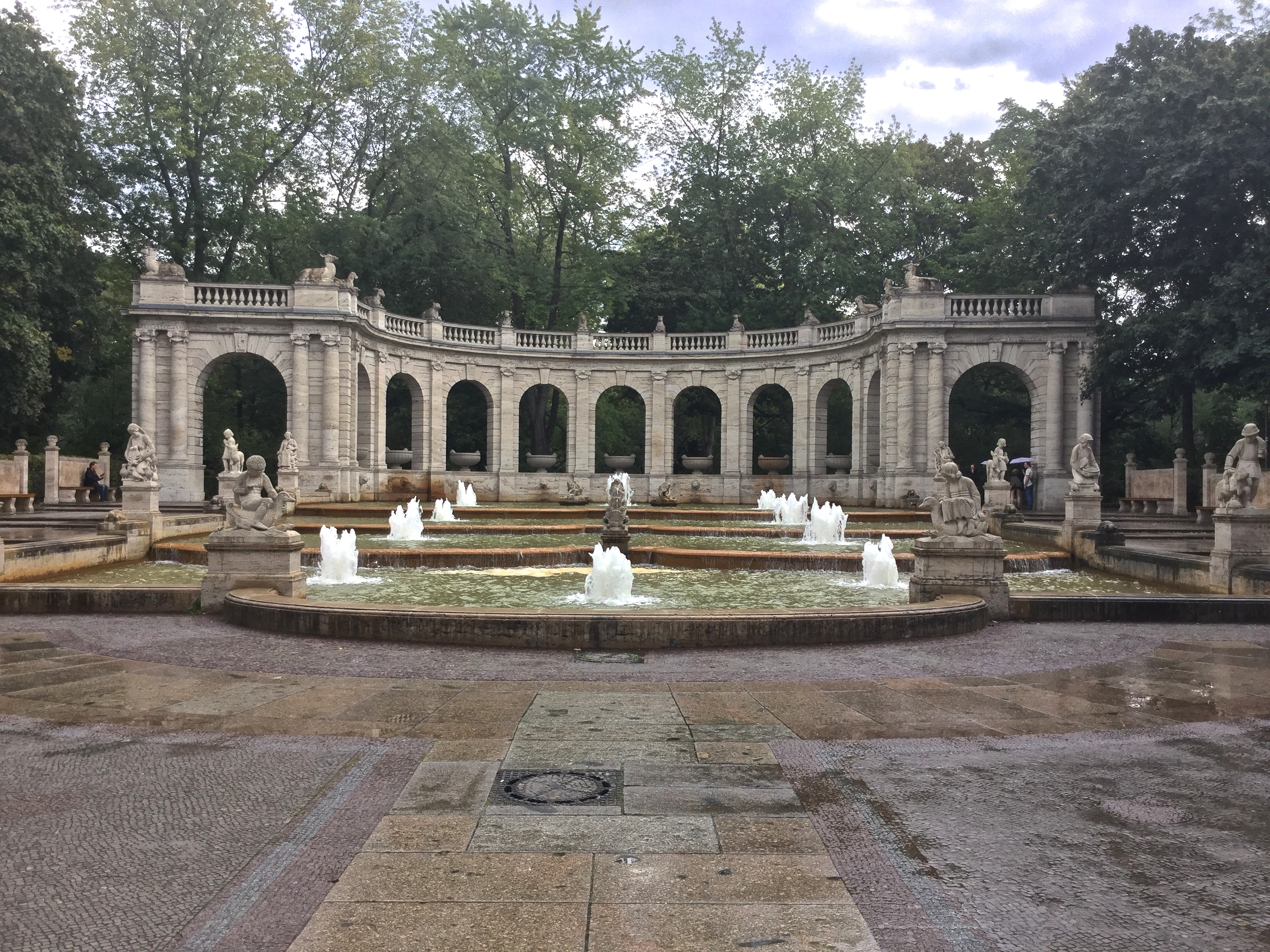
The Märchenbrunnen in Volkspark Friedrichshain, as it appears today.

An element of the park that has survived the destruction wrought during the Second World War is the Märchenbrunnen (lit. 'Fairytale fountain'). Designed in 1913 by Berlin's city building director, Ludwig Hoffmann, the fountain contains 106 stone sculptures representing characters from traditional German fairy tales. The fountain was created for the children of Berlin, during a time in which rickets and typhoid were endemic, and took 12 years to complete.

The Second World War had a dramatic impact upon the rest of the park. The Nazi military made use of the park, constructing flak towers in 1941, as well as bunkers, and as a result much of the park was destroyed by Allied bombing during the war.

=== Post-1945 Reconstruction ===
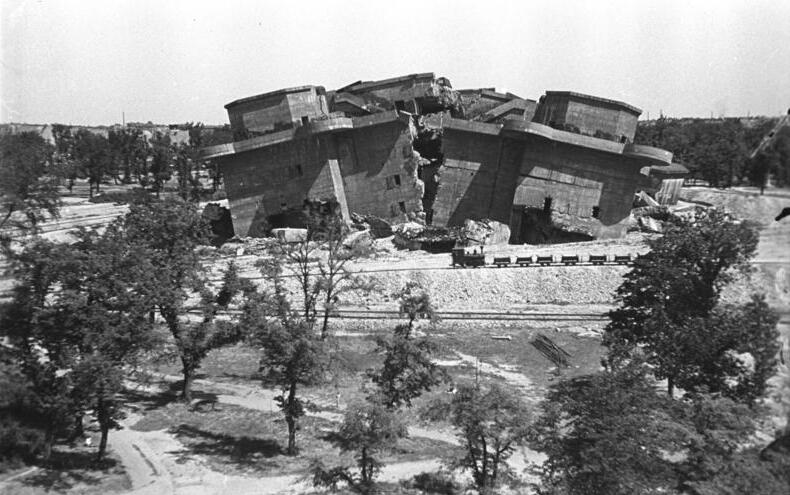
Filling in the destroyed bunkers (August 1949)

At the end of the war Berlin was divided into four parts by the Allied Powers, and the Volkspark resided in the Soviet Sector. The reconstruction of the park was therefore undertaken by the German Democratic Republic (GDR). A plan was devised by Reinhold Lingner, the GDR director of landscape and park architecture, to create two small artificial mountains in the park out of rubble from the bombed-out city. (Note: Similar projects were undertaken throughout postwar Germany, and such peaks are called Schuttberge in German.) In 1946 the bunkers were destroyed, filled, and covered by over two million cubic meters of rubble from the ruins of destroyed buildings. The larger of the two hills became known as both "Mont Klamott" and "Großer Bunkerberg" (lit. 'the big bunker mountain'), and is 78 metres (256 ft) tall. The smaller hill, "Kleiner Bunkerberg" (lit. '"the small bunker mountain'), has a height of 48 metres (157 ft). With the passage of time and the growth of greenery, the hills now appear to be completely natural features.

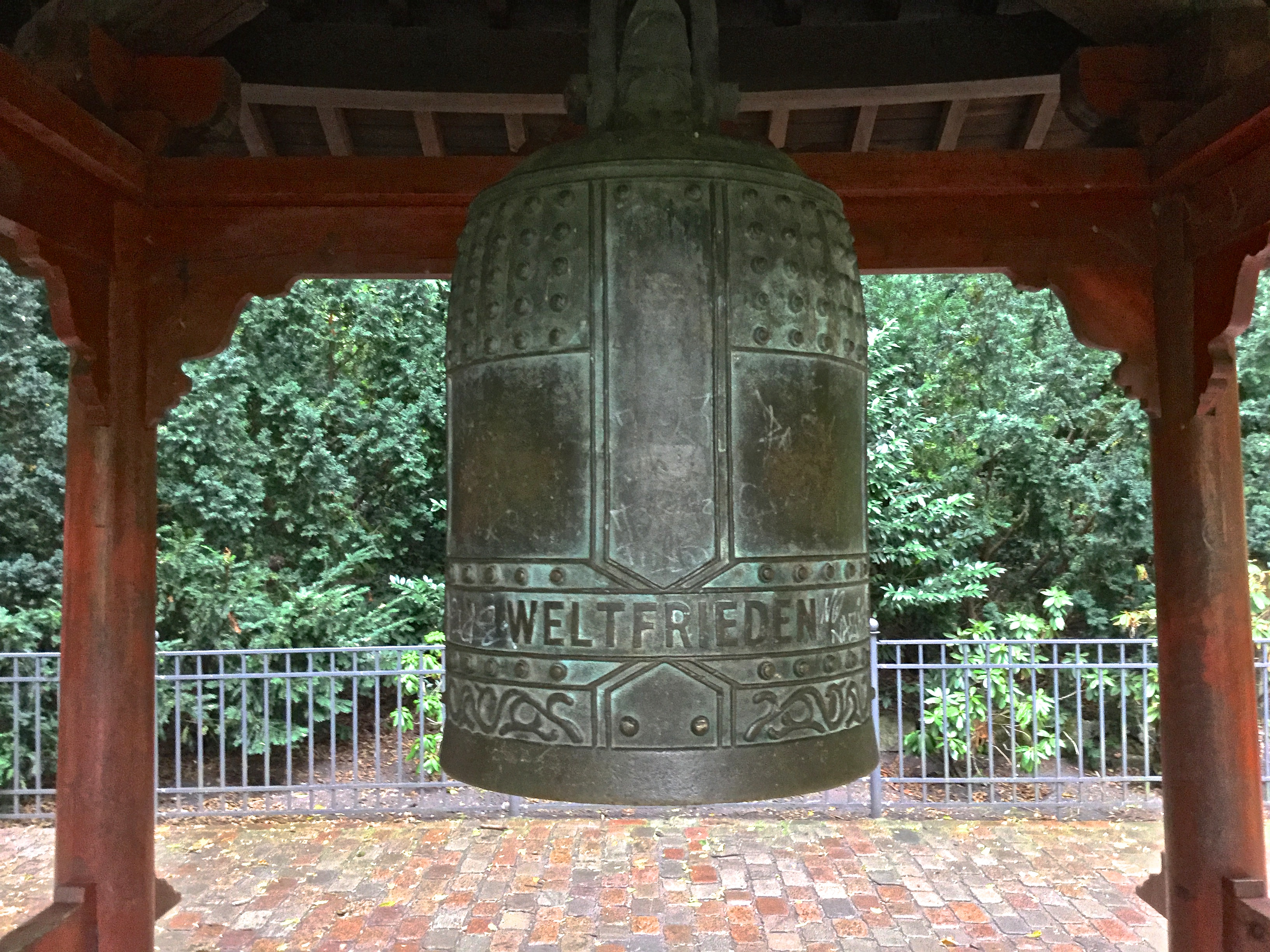
The Peace Bell, given to East Berlin as a gift from Japan.

The park continued its evolution during the Cold War. An open air theater was constructed at the southern end of the park in 1950, and after recent renovation remains open today. In preparation for the 3rd World Festival of Youth an Students two pools were constructed during the period from 1949–1951. The complex included a 5-meter deep pool for diving, and an 8-lane, 50 metres (160 ft) long swimming pool, along with stands for up to 8,000 spectators (Karl-Friedrich-Friesen Stadium). Around 1963, the swimming pool received a collapsible mobile roof that allowed for winter use, although the roof was incorrectly constructed as it was too low. School swimming events, competitions training took place at the stadium, and it also served for other mass events such as the appearance of Hauff and Henkler during the 10th World Festival of Youth and Students in 1973. Due to the conditions of the pool basins and degradation of the bleachers, the facility was demolished in 1999. Only the four lantern pillars of the western gate remain, which were made in the workshop of Karl Souradny in 1951. In GDR times, a youth recreation camp existed in the park, the Indianerdorf (lit. 'Indian village').

The period from 1995 to 2004 saw a period of renovation and reconstruction, during which the Märchenbrunnen (lit. 'Fairytale fountain') was cleaned of a great deal of vandalism that had taken place following German reunification. The swimming pools built in the GDR period have been replaced by a sports complex for beach volleyball, rock climbing, skateboarding, and cycling.

== Monuments ==
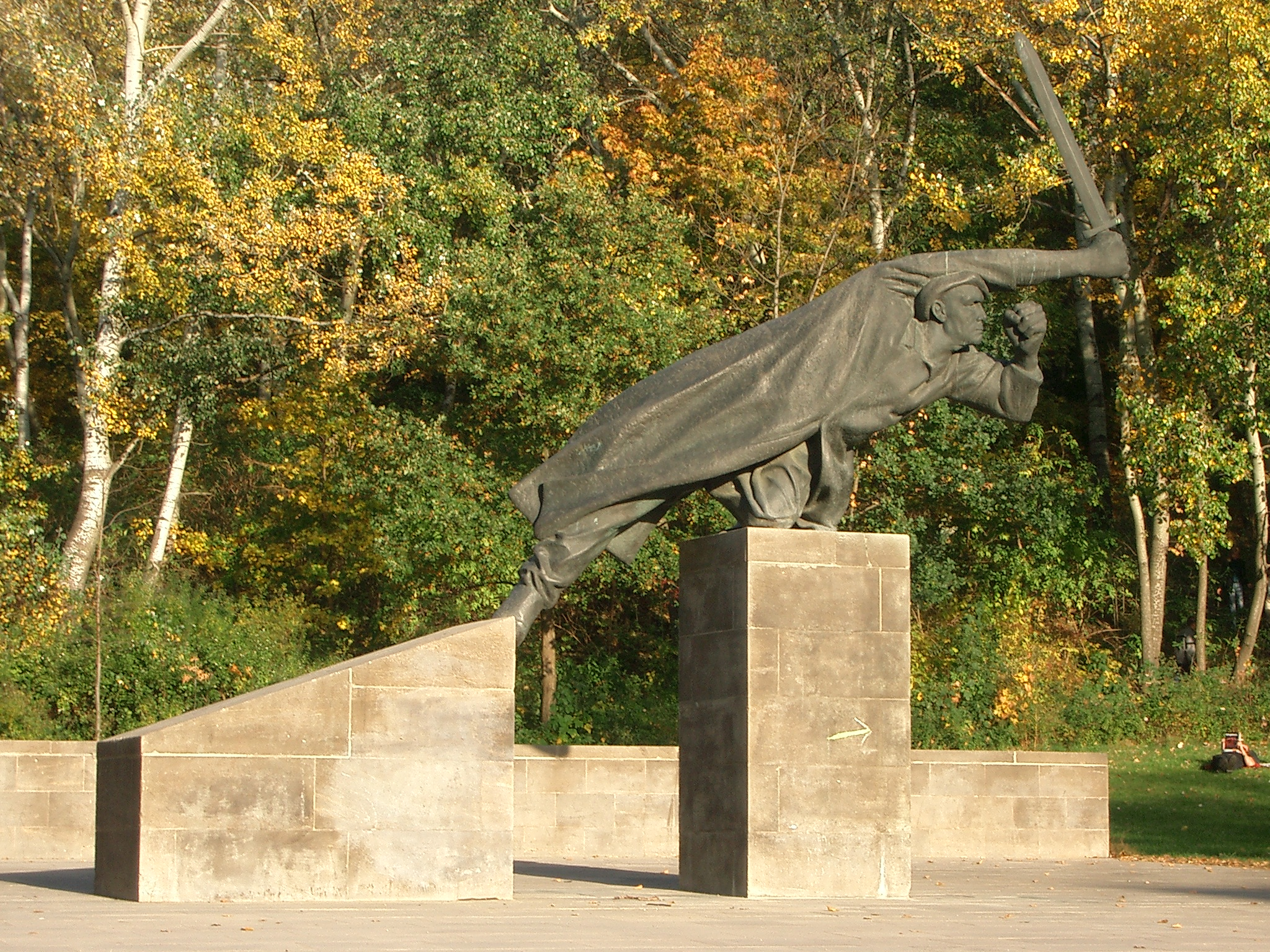
Monument to the Spanish Civil War, erected in 1968

The Volkspark abounds in monuments. In 1989, a Japanese pavilion which included the Weltfriedensglocke, a Japanese Peace Bell dedicated to unity against nuclear war, was constructed in between the two Schuttberge as a gift from Japan to East Berlin.

The park also has monuments to Frederick the Great (a replica of a bronze bust of Frederick II, which was created in 1848 and was probably stolen after the Second World War, restored to its original location in 2000), the March Revolution of 1848, the 1918 Red Sailors' Revolution, the Memorial to Polish Soldiers and German Anti-Fascists (erected 1972, designed by Polish Sculptors Zofia Wolska and Tadeusz Lodzian) and the Spanish Civil War.

The Gedenkstätte der 3000 Interbrigadisten, which is located on the Friedenstraße, was built in 1968 and commemorates 3000 fighters who served in International Brigades during the Spanish Civil War. The six-meter-high bronze figure was designed by Fritz Cremer, with reliefs created by Siegfried Krepp.

== Current configuration ==
The period from 1995 to 2004 saw a period of renovation and reconstruction, during which the Fairy Tale Fountain was cleaned of a great deal of vandalism that had taken place following German reunification. The swimming pools built in the GDR period have been replaced by a sports complex for beach volleyball, rock climbing, skateboarding, and cycling.

The Volkspark is a popular leisure location in Berlin, and is open 24 hours. In addition to the amenities mentioned earlier, the park has several playgrounds, many large Liegewiese (open areas for sunbathing), a pond, tennis courts, a wading pool, and a restaurant. It is also crisscrossed with paths appropriate for jogging at several difficulty levels, and in the winter months a toboggan run is opened. The Park is easily accessible using Bus number 200 from Unter den Linden, Alexanderplatz, etc.
