= Neighbourhood =

Localized community within a larger area

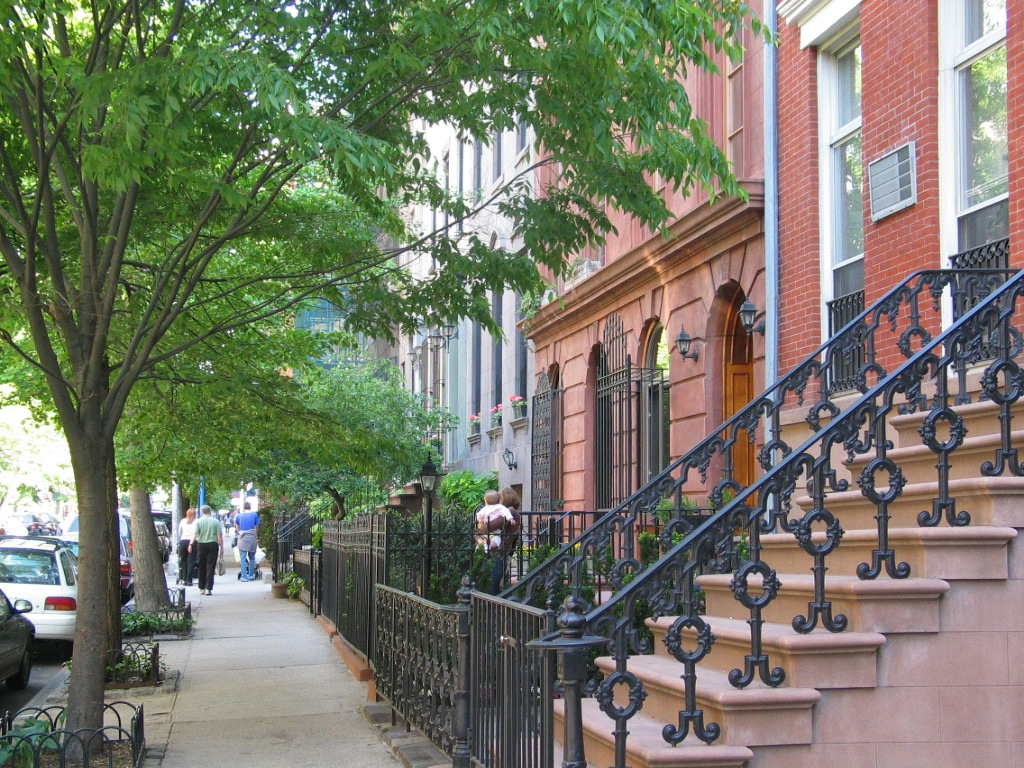
The Chelsea neighbourhood of Manhattan in New York City

A neighbourhood (Commonwealth English) or neighborhood (American English) is a geographically localized community within a larger town, city, suburb or rural area, sometimes consisting of a single street and the buildings lining it. Neighbourhoods are often social communities with considerable face-to-face interaction among members. Researchers have not agreed on an exact definition, but the following may serve as a starting point: "Neighbourhood is generally defined spatially as a specific geographic area and functionally as a set of social networks. Neighbourhoods, then, are the spatial units in which face-to-face social interactions occur—the personal settings and situations where residents seek to realise common values, socialise youth, and maintain effective social control."

== Preindustrial cities ==
In the words of the urban scholar Lewis Mumford, "Neighborhoods, in some annoying, inchoate fashion exist wherever human beings congregate, in permanent family dwellings; and many of the functions of the city tend to be distributed naturally—that is, without any theoretical preoccupation or political direction—into neighborhoods." Most of the earliest cities around the world as excavated by archaeologists have evidence for the presence of social neighbourhoods. Historical documents shed light on neighbourhood life in numerous historical preindustrial or nonwestern cities.

Neighbourhoods are typically generated by social interaction among people living near one another. In this sense they are local social units larger than households not directly under the control of city or state officials. In some preindustrial urban traditions, basic municipal functions such as protection, social regulation of births and marriages, cleaning and upkeep are handled informally by neighbourhoods and not by urban governments; this pattern is well documented for historical Islamic cities.

In addition to social neighbourhoods, most ancient and historical cities also had administrative districts used by officials for taxation, record-keeping, and social control. Administrative districts are typically larger than neighbourhoods and their boundaries may cut across neighbourhood divisions. In some cases, however, administrative districts coincided with neighbourhoods, leading to a high level of regulation of social life by officials. For example, in the Tang period Chinese capital city Chang'an, neighbourhoods were districts and there were state officials who carefully controlled life and activity at the neighbourhood level.

Neighbourhoods in preindustrial cities often had some degree of social specialization or differentiation. Ethnic neighbourhoods were important in many past cities and remain common in cities today. Economic specialists, including craft producers, merchants, and others, could be concentrated in neighbourhoods, and in societies with religious pluralism neighbourhoods were often specialized by religion. One factor contributing to neighbourhood distinctiveness and social cohesion in past cities was the role of rural to urban migration. This was a continual process in preindustrial cities, and migrants tended to move in with relatives and acquaintances from their rural past.

== Sociology ==
Neighbourhood sociology is a subfield of urban sociology which studies local communities Neighbourhoods are also used in research studies from postal codes and health disparities, to correlations with school drop out rates or use of drugs. Some attention has also been devoted to viewing the neighbourhood as a small-scale democracy, regulated primarily by ideas of reciprocity among neighbours.

== Improvement ==
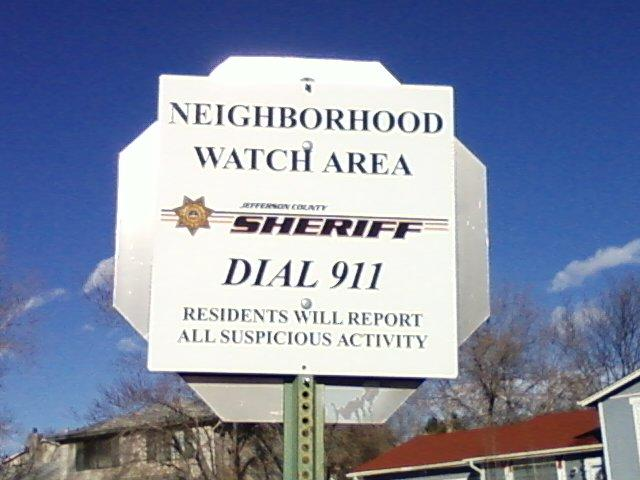
A neighbourhood watch sign in Jefferson County, Colorado

Neighbourhoods have been the site of service delivery or "service interventions" in part as efforts to provide local, quality services, and to increase the degree of local control and ownership. Alfred Kahn, as early as the mid-1970s, described the "experience, theory and fads" of neighbourhood service delivery over the prior decade, including discussion of income transfers and poverty. Neighbourhoods, as a core aspect of community, also are the site of services for youth, including children with disabilities and coordinated approaches to low-income populations. While the term neighbourhood organization is not as common in 2015, these organizations often are non-profit, sometimes grassroots or even core funded community development centres or branches.

Community and economic development activists have pressured for reinvestment in local communities and neighbourhoods. In the early 2000s, Community Development Corporations, Rehabilitation Networks, Neighbourhood Development Corporations, and Economic Development organizations would work together to address the housing stock and the infrastructures of communities and neighbourhoods (e.g., community centres). Community and Economic Development may be understood in different ways, and may involve "faith-based" groups and congregations in cities.

== As a unit in urban design ==
In the early 1900s, Clarence Perry described the idea of a neighbourhood unit as a self-contained residential area within a city. The concept is still influential in New Urbanism. Practitioners seek to revive traditional sociability in planned suburban housing based on a set of principles. At the same time, the neighbourhood is a site of interventions to create Age-Friendly Cities and Communities (AFCC) as many older adults tend to have narrower life space. Urban design studies thus use neighbourhood as a unit of analysis.

== Neighbourhoods around the world ==
=== Asia ===
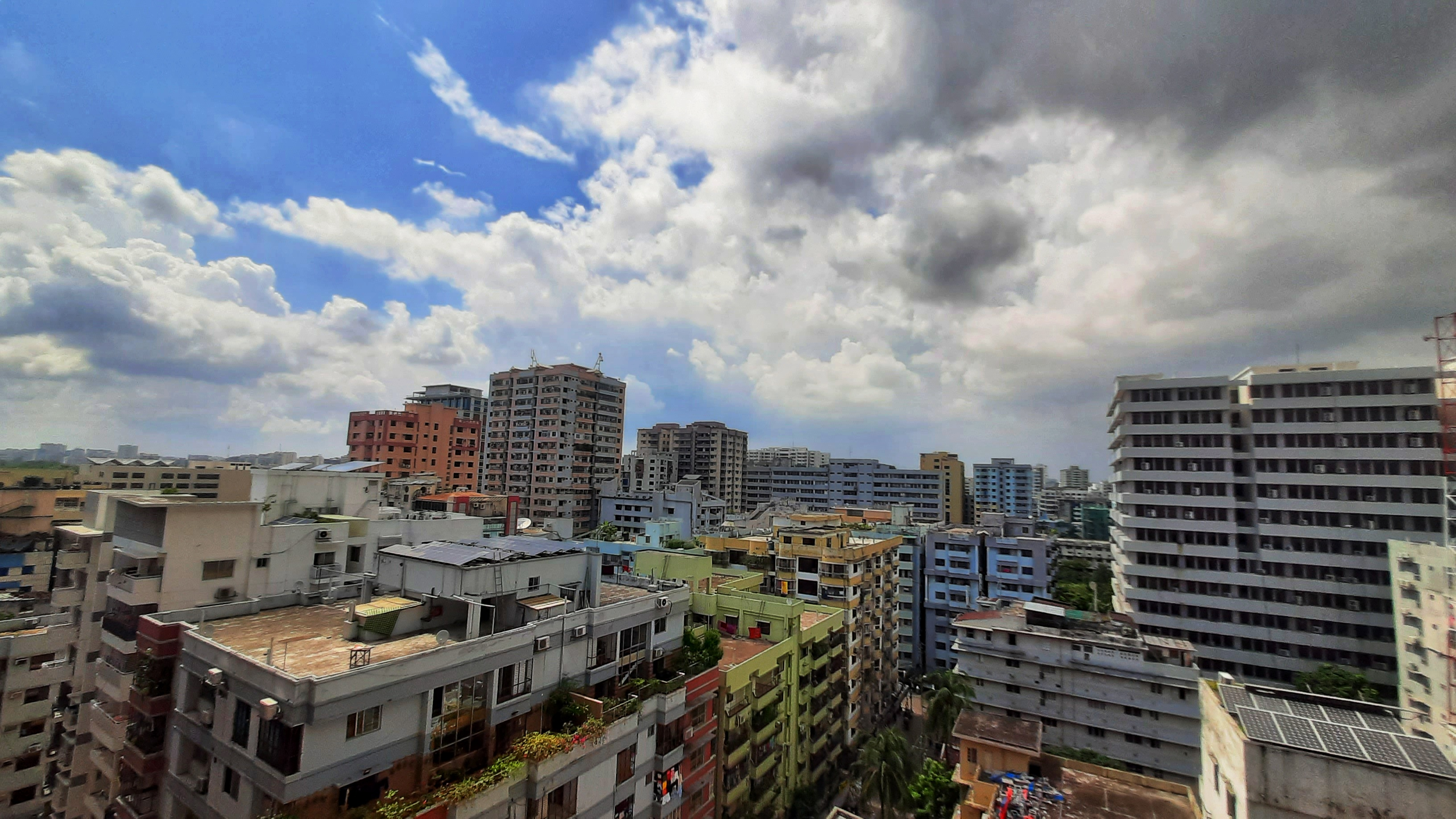
Segunbagicha, a neighbourhhood in Dhaka, Bangladesh

==== China ====
In mainland China, the term is generally used for the urban administrative division found immediately below the district level, although an intermediate, subdistrict level exists in some cities. They are also called streets (administrative terminology may vary from city to city). Neighbourhoods encompass 2,000 to 10,000 families. Within neighbourhoods, families are grouped into smaller residential units or quarters of 100 to 600 families and supervised by a residents' committee; these are subdivided into residents' small groups of fifteen to forty families. In most urban areas of China, neighbourhood, community, residential community, residential unit, residential quarter have the same meaning: 社区 or 小区 or 居民区 or 居住区, and is the direct sublevel of a subdistrict (街道办事处), which is the direct sublevel of a district (区), which is the direct sublevel of a city (市). (See Administrative divisions of the People's Republic of China)

=== Europe ===
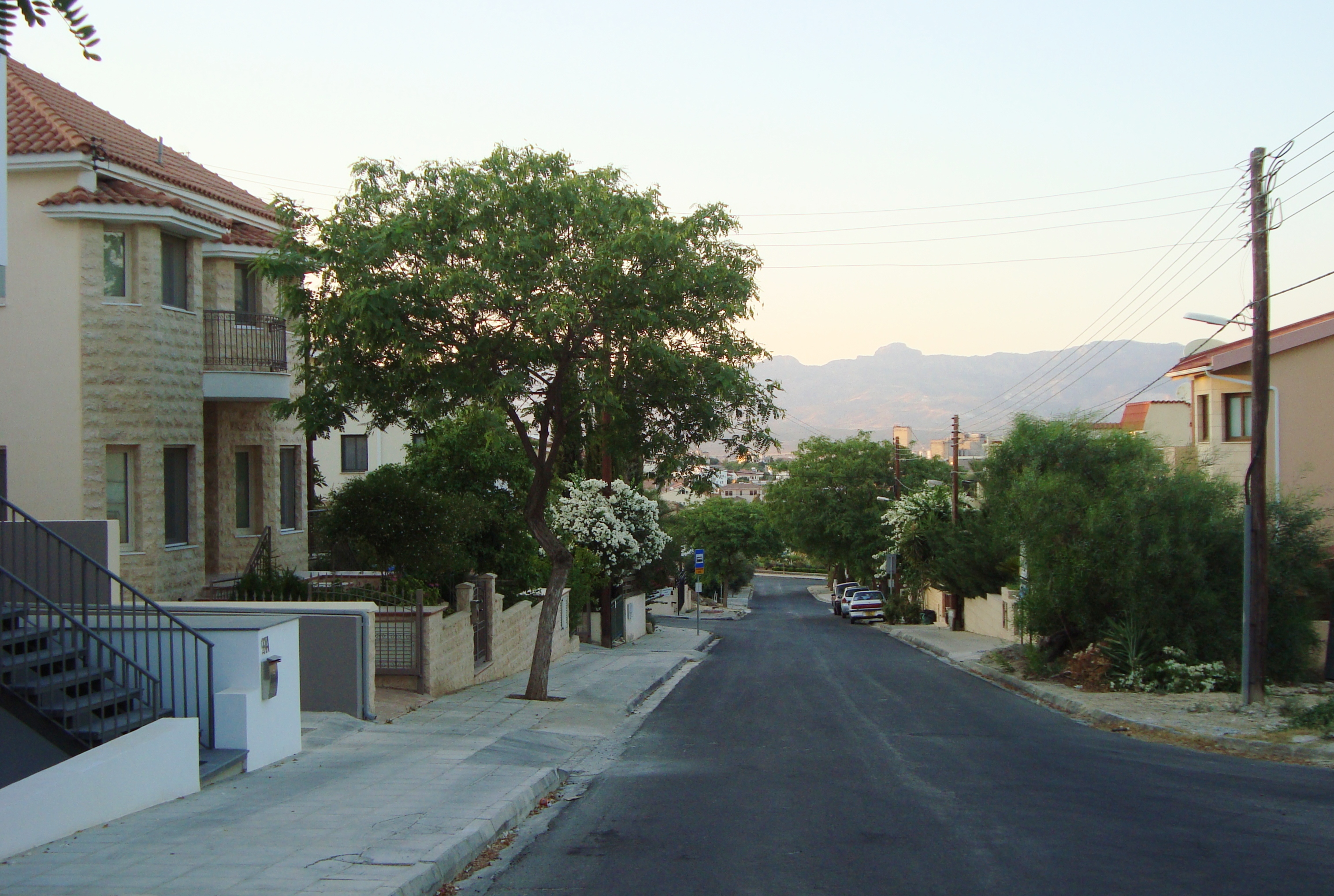
Typical Cypriot neighbourhood in Aglandjia, Nicosia, Cyprus

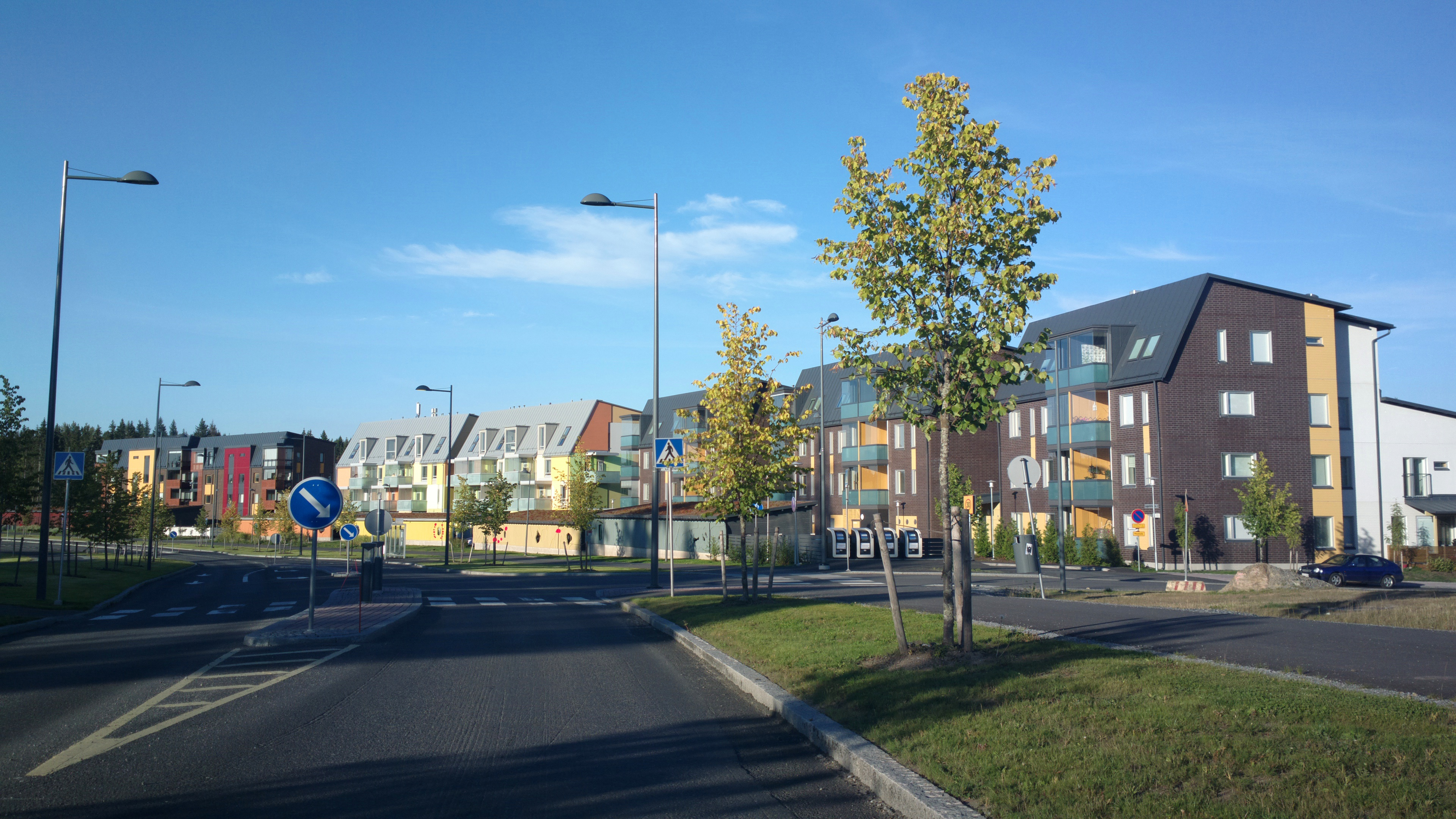
Vuores, a neighbourhood in the city of Tampere, Finland

==== United Kingdom ====
The term has no general official or statistical purpose in the United Kingdom, but is often used by local boroughs for sub-divisions of their area for the provision of services and functions, as for example in Kingston-upon-Thames. Kingston-upon-Thames has four neighbourhoods, each containing a number of wards, which are defined geographic areas, based on the electoral system.

Neighbourhood is also used as an informal term to refer to a small area within a town or city. It is commonly used to refer to organizations which relate to a specific local area, such as neighbourhood policing or Neighbourhood watch schemes.

Another way the term is used is in relation to planning. Neighbourhood planning is the process for giving communities the ability to contribute to how their area develops. The Localism Act 2011 introduced a right for communities to be able to shape their neighbourhoods.

In addition, government statistics for local areas are often referred to as neighbourhood statistics, although the data is usually divided into districts and wards for local purposes. In many parts of the UK wards are roughly equivalent to neighbourhoods or a combination of them.

=== North America ===
In the United States and Canada, neighbourhoods are often given official or semi-official status through neighbourhood associations, neighbourhood watches or block watches. These may regulate such matters as lawn care and fence height, and they may provide such services as block parties, neighbourhood parks and community security. In some other places the equivalent organization is the parish, though a parish may have several neighbourhoods within it depending on the area.

In localities where neighbourhoods do not have an official status, questions can arise as to where one neighbourhood begins and another ends. Many cities use districts and wards as official divisions of the city, rather than traditional neighbourhood boundaries. ZIP Code boundaries and post office names also sometimes reflect neighbourhood identities.

=== South America ===
==== Peru ====
In Peru, neighbourhoods are known as urbanizaciones (lit. 'urbanizations'), functionally serving as subdivisions of the country's districts. The term usually refers to a planned community whose development furthers the urbanisation process of the populated centre where it is located. Santa Beatriz, established in 1921, is considered the country's first modern neighbourhood.

== See also ==
- Barangay (Philippines)
- Barrio (Spanish)
- Bairro (Portuguese)
- Block Parent Program (Canada)
- Borough
- Census-designated place
- Committees for the Defense of the Revolution (Cuba)
- Community
- Comparison of Home Owners' and Civic Associations
- Electoral precinct
- Frazione (Italian)
- Homeowners' association
- Kiez (German)
- Komshi (Balkan states during the Ottoman Empire)
- Mahalle
- Mister Rogers' Neighborhood
- Neighbourhood Watch
- New urbanism
- Pedestrian village
- Quarter
- Residential community
- Suburbs
- Unincorporated community
- Viertel (disambiguation) (German)
