= Enver Bey cigarette factory =

German cigarette manufacturer (1909–1936)

Enver Bey
- Zigarettenfabrik Enver Bey
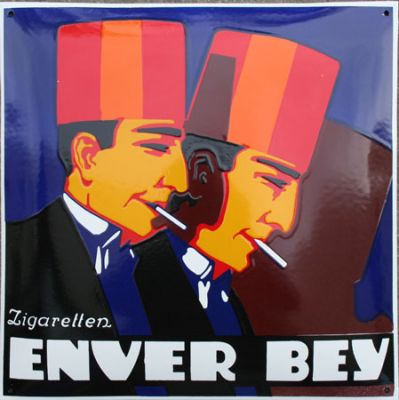
- A pack of "Enver Bey" cigarettes
- Formation: 1909
- Founder: Mendel Gottreich
- Founded at: Berlin-Friedrichshain, Germany
- Dissolved: 1936
- Headquarters: Koppenstraße 27, Berlin-Friedrichshain, Germany
- Products: Cigarettes
- Staff: 270

Enver Bey cigarette factory (German: Zigarettenfabrik Enver Bey) was a German cigarette factory located in Berlin-Friedrichshain. It was founded in 1909 and closed in 1936.

== History ==
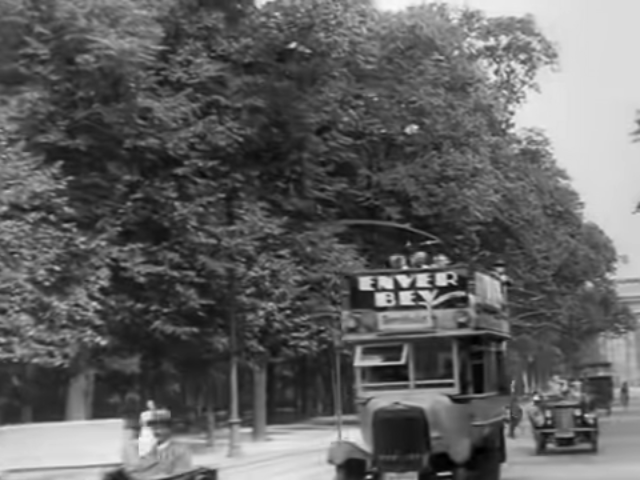
An advertisement for Enver Bey cigarettes on a bus touring the streets of Berlin (1927)

Before the Second World War, the cultural sphere of the Ottoman Empire referred to in Europe as the "Orient" served as an important point of reference for German cigarette consumers. Accordingly, not only imports but also advertising strategies were oriented toward this image. After the war, however, as West Germany increasingly aligned itself with the Western bloc, consumer preferences shifted toward American tobacco products.

The cigarette factory was founded in Berlin in 1909 by Mendel Gottreich. In 1926, the company established a general agency in Hamburg. During this period, approximately 270 people were employed by Gottreich.

The factory owner named the company out of admiration for Enver Pasha, a prominent Ottoman military officer and politician who had previously held the honorary title of Bey. Gottreich reportedly regarded him as a young reformer and reorganizer of Turkey, which he viewed as bound by outdated traditions. It is said that, in response to the request to use his name, Enver Pasha sent Gottreich a signed photograph accompanied by a letter of thanks.

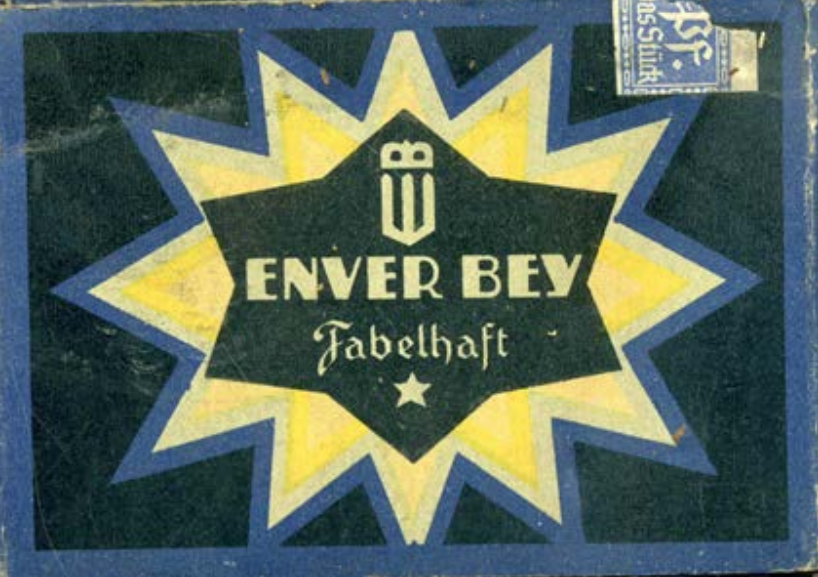
Packaging of the ‘Fabelhaft’ cigarette brand by Enver Bey cigarette factory, Berlin, circa 1920.

Already known in Germany, this Young Turk figure gained prominence through the popularity of the cigarette brand bearing his name.

== Brands ==
Cigarette brands distributed:

- Die Dicke Enver (1930s)
- Ballnacht
- Cabinet
- Edelhof
- Fabelhaft
- Orient
- Sonett
- Tula
- TulaSilber
