= Viertel =

Viertel is a German word meaning "quarter", and may refer to:

Surname

- Viertel (surname)

Places

- a neighbourhood, kiez or quarter
- Bahnhofsviertel, a district (Stadtteil) of Frankfurt am Main, Germany
- Bankenviertel (Banking Quarter) in Frankfurt am Main, Germany
- Holländisches Viertel (Dutch Quarter), a neighborhood in Potsdam
- Mostviertel (Most Quarter) in Lower Austria
- Waldviertel (Forest Quarter) in Lower Austria
- Weinviertel (Wine Quarter) in Lower Austria
- Industrieviertel (Industrial Quarter) in Lower Austria
- Jesse Viertel Memorial Airport, also known as Jesse P. Viertel Airport, an airport in Cooper County, Missouri, United States
- Märkisches Viertel, a locality (Ortsteil) in the borough (Bezirk) of Reinickendorf in Berlin, Germany
- Nikolaiviertel (Nikolai Quarter) in Berlin, Germany
- Viertel (Bremen), a district of Bremen, Germany
