= Rita Thomas =

German LGBTQ activst (1931–2018)

- Born: 19 October 1931; Berlin, German Reich
- Died: 15 December 2018 (aged 87); Berlin, Germany
- Resting place: Auferstehungsfriedhof, Berlin
- Occupations: Dog groomer Human rights activist
- Years active: 1950–2018
- Organization: Homosexual Interest Group Berlin
- Known for: Documenting queer life in East Berlin

Rita Thomas (19 October 1931 – 15 December 2018) was a German dog groomer who documented lesbian life in East Germany. She was a member of the Homosexual Interest Group Berlin, and her home in East Berlin became known as a safe haven for LGBTQ people living in the city following the construction of the Berlin Wall in 1961.

== Early life ==
Thomas was born on 19 October 1931 in Weißensee, a quarter in the Berlin borough of Pankow. She was the youngest of three children; her father worked as an oxyacetylene welder for Krupp and. ran his own car repair shop. After the end of World War II in 1945, Thomas' father divorced her mother and moved to the western part of Kreuzberg to live with another woman. Thomas' mother worked various temporary jobs, leaving Thomas and her siblings to largely live independently as they grew older.

From around the age of 15, Thomas began going by the nickname "Tommy", a name also used by her father and uncle, and began wearing trousers and, later, styling her hair into a pompadour and wearing ties and trench coats. Thomas became identified as a Bubi, a term used during the early 20th century to describe lesbians presenting in a masculine way.

== Personal life ==
From the age of 17, Thomas began working various jobs, including setting up carousels at funfairs around Berlin. She later began working at a dog grooming salon in Friedrichshain, and completed an apprenticeship as an animal groomer. In 1962, Thomas took over management of the salon. She also trained dogs for appearances in film and television, as well as for Schutzhund, and participated in dog shows. Following the Peaceful Revolution and the reunification of Germany, Thomas was forced to give up ownership of her dog grooming salon. She continued to care for the animals of her former clients, and made a living selling secondhand goods.

In 1950, Thomas met Helli in Weißensee, who was two years younger than her; they remained in a relationship until Thomas' death in 2018. Their relationship was not monogamous, and at times both had other partners; they never lived together, but lived nearby one another. Thomas and Helli shared an allotment in Weißensee, and celebrated Christmas together.

== Activism ==
During the 1950s, Thomas and Helli were frequent patrons of Berlin's gay nightclubs, including at Fürstenau in Kreuzberg, which held women-only nights. Thomas and Helli were about to cross the Oberbaum Bridge as the Berlin Wall neared completion in the early hours of 13 August 1961; while a West German police officer offered them the opportunity to remain in West Berlin, they ultimately decided to return to Weißensee due to their dogs. The subsequent completion of the Wall later that day prevented Thomas from accessing the Berlin queer scene, which had been exclusively located in West Berlin.

Following the construction of the Berlin Wall, Thomas made her home at Thaerstraße 42 in Friedrichshain (the same building as her dog grooming salon) available as a private meeting place for LGBTQ people in East Berlin; she installed a bar and set aside a room for dancing. Thomas also had a dacha in Weißensee that she used to meet with close female friends. Thomas' home was one of several belonging to members of the East German LGBTQ community for socialising and discussion. Unlike some other homes, Thomas' was known exclusively for socialising and not for political discussion; Thomas was not known to have any close contact with women's groups or queer groups operating in East Berlin during the 1960s.

By the 1970s, however, Thomas had become a member of the Homosexual Interest Group Berlin, which had been founded in 1973 and was the first major association of LGBTQ people in East Germany. Thomas had been friends with the group's founders, including Peter Rausch and Michael Eggert, as well as Charlotte von Mahlsdorf, who had let the HIB use her home as a base, and who regularly visited Thomas' home. Thomas played a key role in organising the HIB's events, including a queer commemorations of Pentecost in 1975 and 1976, and trips to the cinema and theatre; she encouraged many of the queer people she had met through holding gatherings at her home to join the group. Thomas also was a member of HIB's cabaret group, Hibaré, and was its only female performer, though she exclusively performed male roles.

The HIB did campaign to be recognised by East German authorities as an official group, though was ultimately unsuccessful. At the end of 1979, it ceased its political activities, and in 1980 it decided to put its work on hold. Thomas continued to host gatherings at her home into the 1990s.

== Documentation ==
While Thomas never published any writing, she documented much of her life through photographs. Her collection includes many documenting queer life in East Germany from the 1950s onwards, including gatherings held at Thaerstraße 42, and the work of the Homosexual Interest Group Berlin. Many of her photos document intimacy between women. In 2017 and 2018, much of Thomas' collection was digitised by the feminist archive FFBIZ.

In 1992, Thomas was featured in the documentary film ...viel zu viel verschwiegen, about the experiences of lesbians in East Germany, as well as the book of the same name.

In 2003, some of Thomas' photographs were featured in the exhibition Mittenmang. Homosexuelle Männer und Frauen in Berlin 1945–1969 at the Schwules Museum in Berlin, curated by Maika Leffers and Karl-Heinz Steinle. Following the exhibition, Thomas donated some of her photographs to the museum.

In 2016, Thomas gave a biographical interview to the Magnus Hirschfeld Federal Foundation, for its "Archives of Other Memories" programme. In 2018, she gave a further interview about lesbian life in East Berlin.

== Death ==
Thomas died unexpectedly on 15 December 2018, following an operation. She was cremated, and her urn was interred at the Auferstehungsfriedhof in Weißensee. In November 2024, a memorial plaque was installed at her former home and salon at Thaerstraße 42. Anette von Zitzewitz, who had directed ...viel zu viel verschwiegen, gave the eulogy.
