= Komshi =

Neighborhood

Komšija (Turkish: komşu, "neighbor") or Komšiluk denotes a neighborhood in the Balkans. It was in the culture for Balkan families to serve their neighbor. Balkan neighbors or komshis had special relations between them, whether they were Muslims, Christians, or Jews. Their houses had two gates or doors, one facing the street, the other leading to the komshi. Somebody could easily arrive at the komshi gate from the opposite street without walking through a public road, people offered their komshi food from their own table. It was Balkan culture that had its origin in Turkish culture.

Komshi is made of mutual respect, reciprocal help and assistance, work and neighbourhood relationships, and invitations to important events of a family. People engaged in a komšiluk are called komšije.
