= Friedrichshain =

- Quarter of Berlin
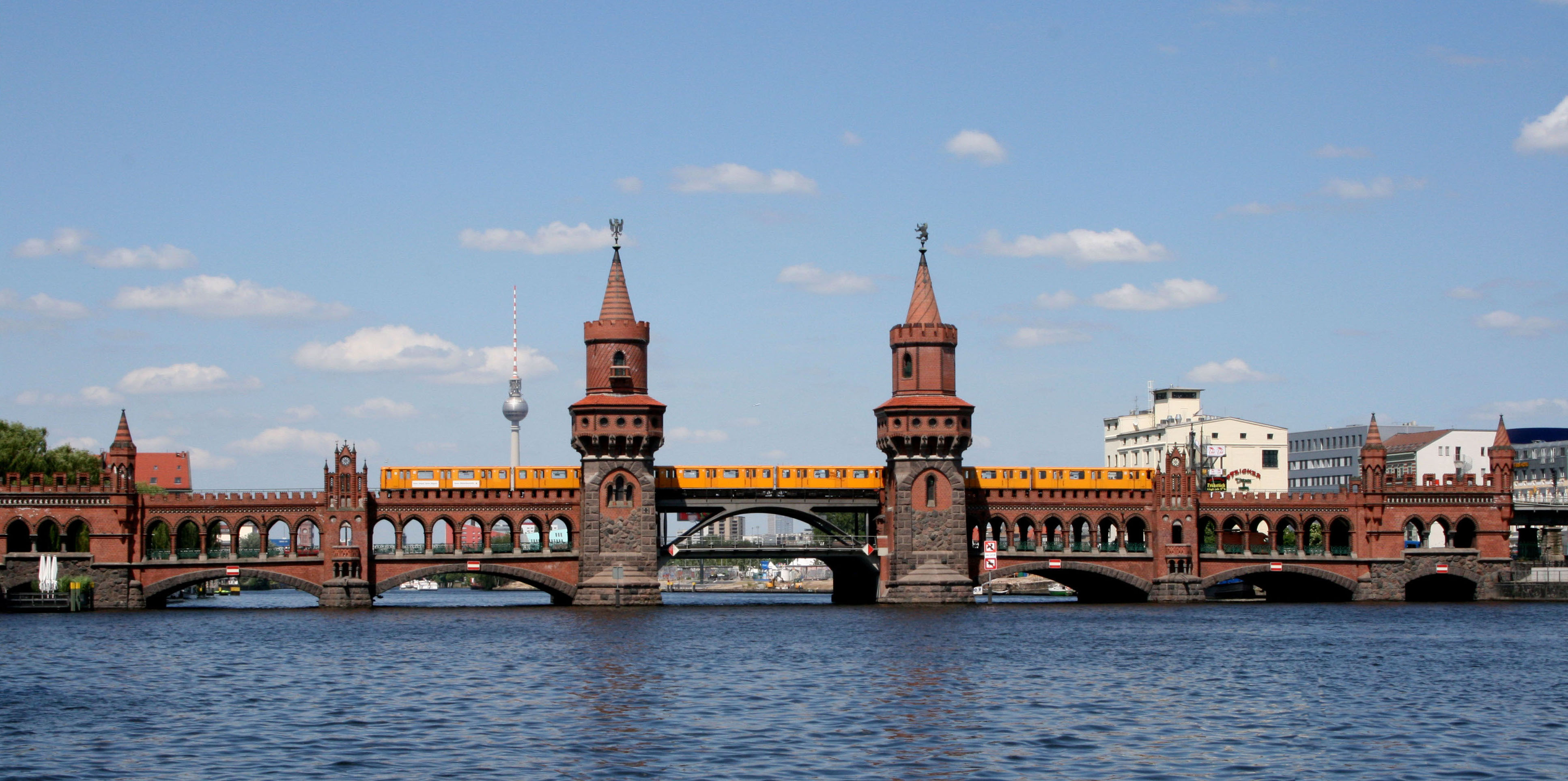
- Oberbaumbrücke

- Coat of arms

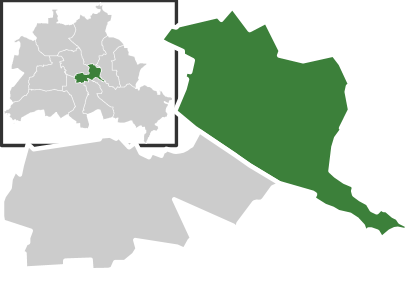
- Location of Friedrichshain in Friedrichshain-Kreuzberg and Berlin
- Interactive map of Friedrichshain
- Location within Germany Location within Berlin
- Coordinates: 52°30′57″N 13°27′15″E
- Country: Germany
- State: Berlin
- City: Berlin
- Borough: Friedrichshain-Kreuzberg
- Founded: 1920
- Subdivisions: 3 zones

Area
  - Total: 9.78 km^{2} (3.78 sq mi)
- Elevation: 52 m (171 ft)

Population (2024-12-31)
  - Total: 141,206
  - Density: 14,400/km^{2} (37,400/sq mi)
- Time zone: UTC+01:00 (CET)
  - Summer (DST): UTC+02:00 (CEST)
- Postal codes: 10243, 10245, 10247, 10249
- Vehicle registration: B

Friedrichshain (German pronunciation: [ˈfʁiːdʁɪçsˌhaɪn]) is a quarter (Ortsteil) of the borough of Friedrichshain-Kreuzberg in Berlin, Germany. From its creation in 1920 until 2001, it was a freestanding city borough. Formerly part of East Berlin, it is adjacent to Mitte, Prenzlauer Berg, Kreuzberg and Lichtenberg.

Friedrichshain is named after the Volkspark Friedrichshain, a vast green park at the northern border with Prenzlauer Berg. In the Nazi era, the borough was called Horst-Wessel-Stadt. Friedrichshain is one of the trendy districts of Berlin and has experienced gentrification.

== Geography ==
Friedrichshain is defined by the following roads and places, starting clock-wise in the west: Lichtenberger Straße, Mollstraße, Otto-Braun-Straße, Am Friedrichshain, Virchowstraße, Margarete-Sommer-Straße, Danziger Straße, Landsberger Allee, Hausburgstraße, Thaerstraße, Eldenaer Straße, S-Bahn-Trasse, Kynaststraße, Stralauer Halbinsel, Spree.

== History ==
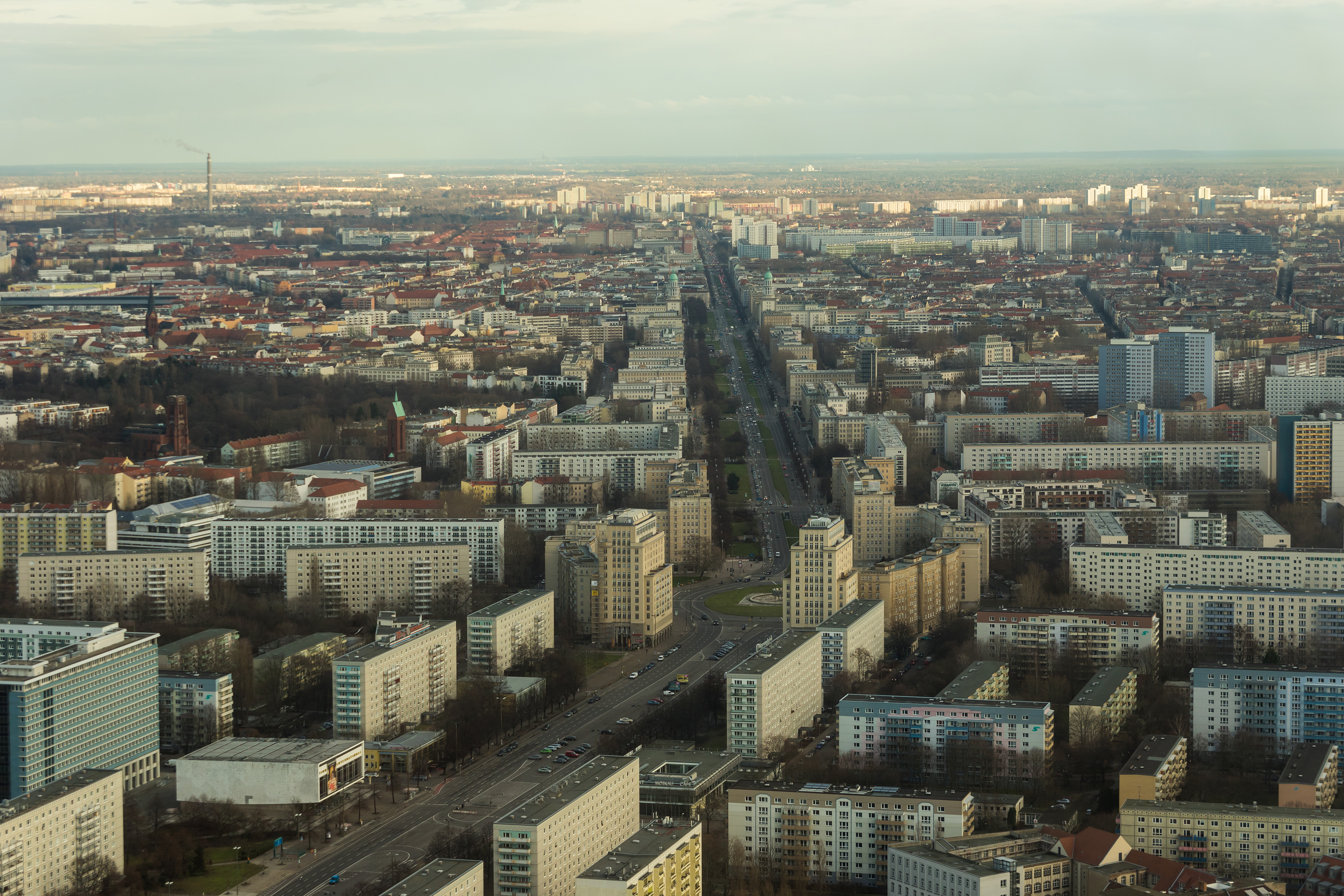
Karl-Marx-Allee, the broad boulevard that bisects Friedrichshain, seen from TV tower

The largely working-class district was created in 1920 when Greater Berlin was established by referendum, incorporating several surrounding settlements. Friedrichshain united the Frankfurter Vorstadt, already part of Berlin, and the villages of Boxhagen and Stralau. It took its name (meaning 'Frederick's Grove') from the Volkspark ('People's Park'), which was planned in 1840 to commemorate the centenary of Frederick the Great's coronation. Much of the district was settled in the rapid industrialization of the 19th and early 20th centuries, led by growth in manufacturing and crafts. It owed much to the opening of the railway line between Berlin and Frankfurt (Oder) in 1846 (which terminated near the site of today's Berlin Ostbahnhof), and the opening of the first waterworks in 1865 at Stralauer Tor. In 1874 the Krankenhaus im Friedrichshain was opened, Berlin's first hospital beside the university clinic Charité. In the early 1900s, the district's largest employer was the Knorr-Bremse brake factory; the Knorrpromenade, one of Friedrichshain's most attractive streets, was built to house the management. The street network of Friedrichhain was originally specified in the Hobrecht-Plan and the area was part of what came to be known architecturally as the Wilhelmine Ring.

When the Nazis came to power in 1933, the district was renamed Horst-Wessel-Stadt after the Nazi activist and writer of the Nazi hymn whose slow death, after being shot by communists, in Friedrichshain hospital in 1930 was turned into a propaganda event by Joseph Goebbels.

During World War II Friedrichshain was one of the most badly damaged parts of Berlin, as Allied strategic bombers specifically targeted its industries. As late as the nineties, some buildings still displayed bullet holes from the intense house to house fighting during the Battle of Berlin. After the war ended, the boundary between the US and Soviet occupation sectors ran between Friedrichshain and Kreuzberg, with Friedrichshain in the east and Kreuzberg in the west. This became a sealed border between East and West Berlin when the Berlin Wall was built in 1961.

Stalinallee (previously Große Frankfurter Straße) was built in Friedrichshain in the late 1940s and early 1950s as a prestige project; the architecture of its 'workers' palaces' is strongly reminiscent of the ostentatious Soviet-era Moscow boulevards and is sometimes mockingly described as Zuckerbäckerstil ('wedding cake style'). The 1953 uprising had its origins in these construction projects, as increased work quotas led to protests that soon spread throughout East Germany, and were only put down by armed Soviet intervention.

In the period of De-Stalinization following the Soviet leader's death, the boulevard was renamed Karl-Marx-Allee at one end and Frankfurter Allee at the other. From this time onwards, Friedrichshain often featured on East Berlin's cultural map: in 1962 the Kosmos, East Germany's largest cinema, was opened, followed in 1981 by the country's most ambitious swimming and sports complex, the Sport- und Erholungszentrum. Neither of these buildings serve their original function today.

== Lifestyle ==
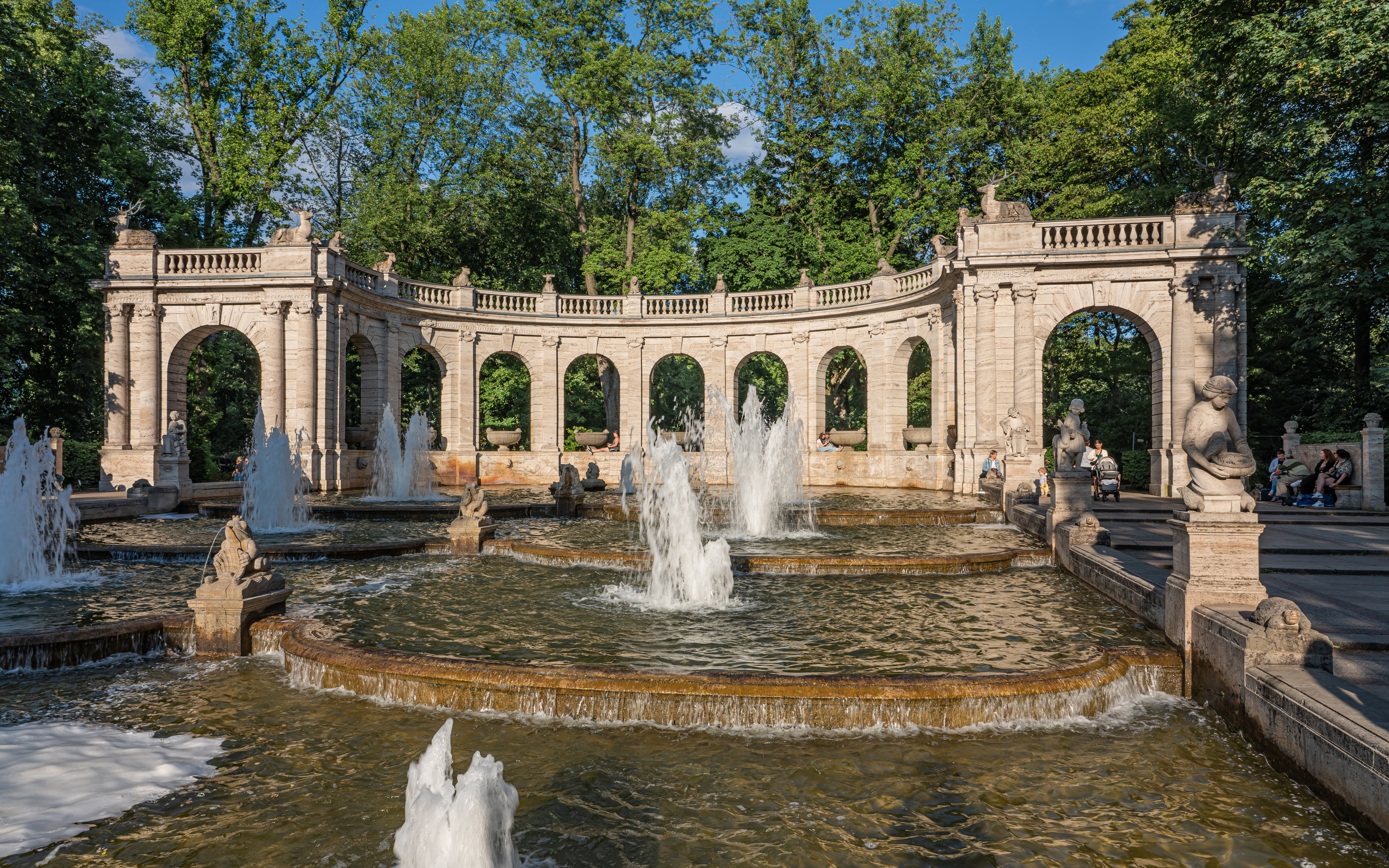
Märchenbrunnen in Volkspark Friedrichshain

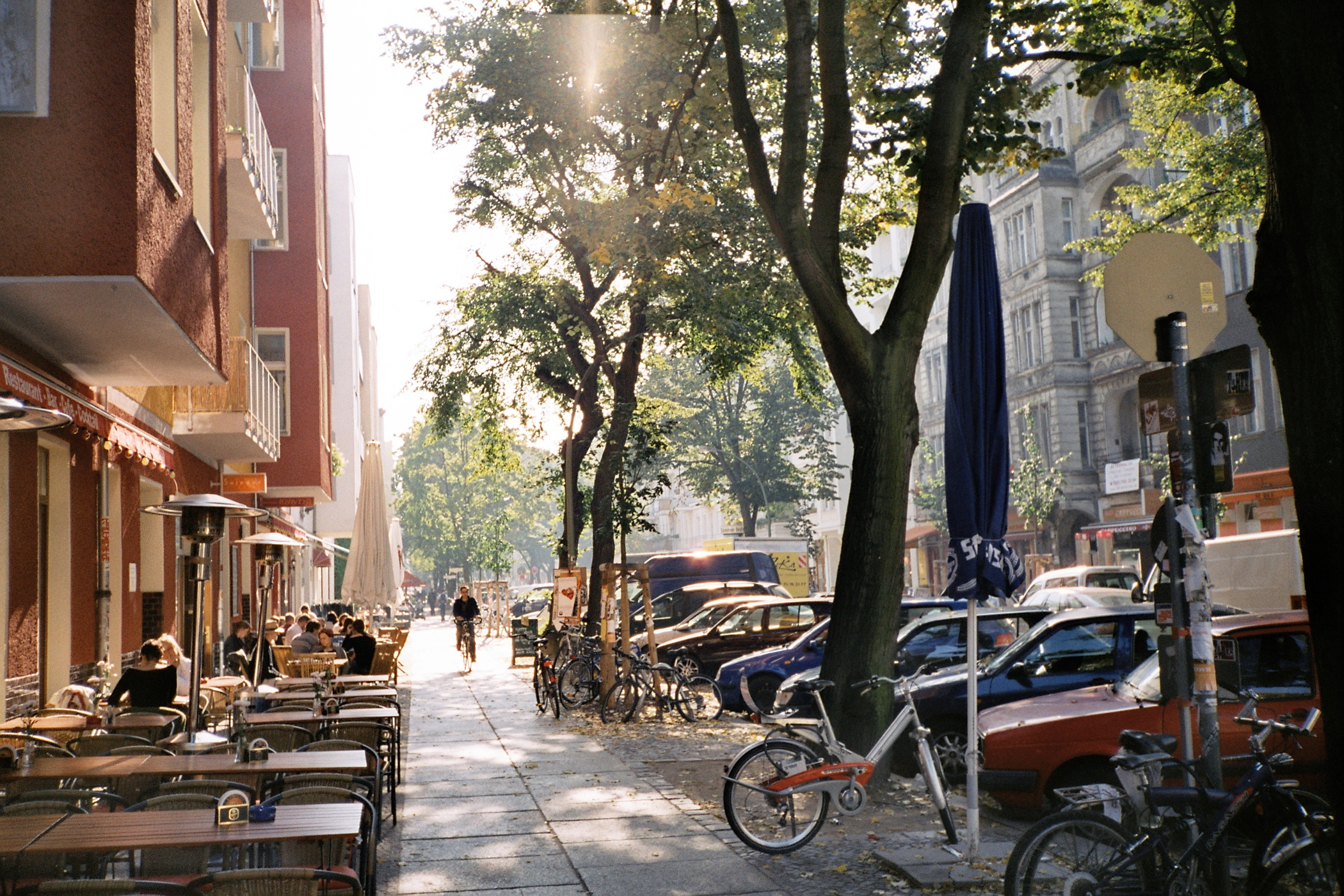
Simon-Dach-Straße is the "heart" of Friedrichshain and one of the liveliest places in East Berlin.

In the course of the changes following the fall of the Berlin Wall in November 1989, the free elections in March 1990 and leading up to German reunification the following October, Friedrichshain began to develop a reputation as a young, dynamic district, thanks in part to low rents and the many empty apartments that also attracted the attention of squatters including many from former West Berlin. On 14 November that year, Friedrichshain experienced violent clashes when hundreds of squatters were forcefully evicted from houses in Mainzer Straße by police acting on the orders of the Senate of the recently united city, an act which would trigger the fall of the governing coalition when the Green Party withdrew in protest. In the following years further squatters were evicted under the hardline conservative Senator for the Interior, but others were able to buy the houses they lived in, and they remain a distinct counter-cultural influence in the district to this day. The fight against eviction remains a daily struggle for the last squats still standing: in October 2020, the anarco-queer-feminist squat Liebig34 on Liebigstrasse was evicted.

Alongside the neighbouring districts of Mitte, Prenzlauer Berg, and Kreuzberg, Friedrichshain is now considered one of Berlin's most fashionable areas, and is home to numerous design and media companies. It is known for its many bars, clubs, pubs, and cafés, concentrated in the vicinity of Simon-Dach-Straße and Boxhagener Platz. There were numerous squats in Friedrichshain, with many in and around Rigaer Straße, Mainzer Straße and Scharnweberstraße. In contrast to the districts of Prenzlauer Berg and Mitte, which have experienced high levels of demographic change and rented accommodation is higher price, it is only since the late 1990s that Friedrichshain has undergone a similar trend. Following German reunification, the availability of comparatively cheap rented accommodation attracted students and artists. In the 2020s, numerous restoration works are under way and Friedrichshain is developing at a fast pace becoming more and more gentrified itself.

At the opposite end of the district, the Volkspark Friedrichshain is a large park serving the densely populated area of Prenzlauer Berg on the other side. Its distinctive features include the Märchenbrunnen (Fairytale Fountain) and two wooded "mountains" consisting purely of rubble and the ruins of two World War II Flak towers.

The urban park Volkspark Friedrichshain offers opportunities for sport and recreation. The neighborhood is also home to many restaurants, several exhibition spaces, cinemas and the Berlin Kriminal Theatre, which specialises in crime stories. Frankfurter Allee features various shopping facilities as well as the Ring-Center shopping mall.

== Points of interest ==
- East Side Gallery, a part of the Berlin Wall that was turned into an international outdoor gallery
- Karl-Marx-Allee, a boulevard lined with buildings in the Stalinist style, originally called Stalinallee
- Frankfurter Tor, two landmark towers on Karl-Marx-Allee, which resemble the church domes on Gendarmenmarkt
- Oberbaumbrücke, a road and rail bridge connecting Kreuzberg and Friedrichshain built in North German brick
- Fairytale Fountain in Volkspark Friedrichshain
- Boxhagener Platz, heart of the Friedrichshain Kiez or neighborhood
- Straße der Pariser Kommune, a street beginning north of the Karl-Marx-Allee and extending to the banks of the Spree
- Samariterviertel with the Samariterkirche (Church of the Good Samaritan)
- Berlin Ostbahnhof, a main line railway station
- Uber Arena, a multipurpose indoor arena with capacity for 17,000 people
- Volkspark Friedrichshain, with its Memorial to Polish Soldiers and German Anti-Fascists
- Bänschstraße, a boulevard lined with buildings in the Jugendstil in Berlin Friedrichshain
- Stralau peninsula, a 5 min walk from railway station Treptower Park. A riverside path runs around the entire peninsula and the Rummelsburger See lake. The Stralau peninsula is a perfect spot for a picnic on weekends, do sport, take a nice walk at the waterfront or watch the sun go down behind the Oberbaum Bridge
- Friedrichshain Photo Gallery, the oldest communal photo gallery in Berlin, founded in 1985
- Berghain, a techno music club
- Rockcafé Halford, a bar dedicated to the British heavy metal vocalist Rob Halford
- Ramones Museum, a museum dedicated to the American punk rock band the Ramones

== Gallery ==
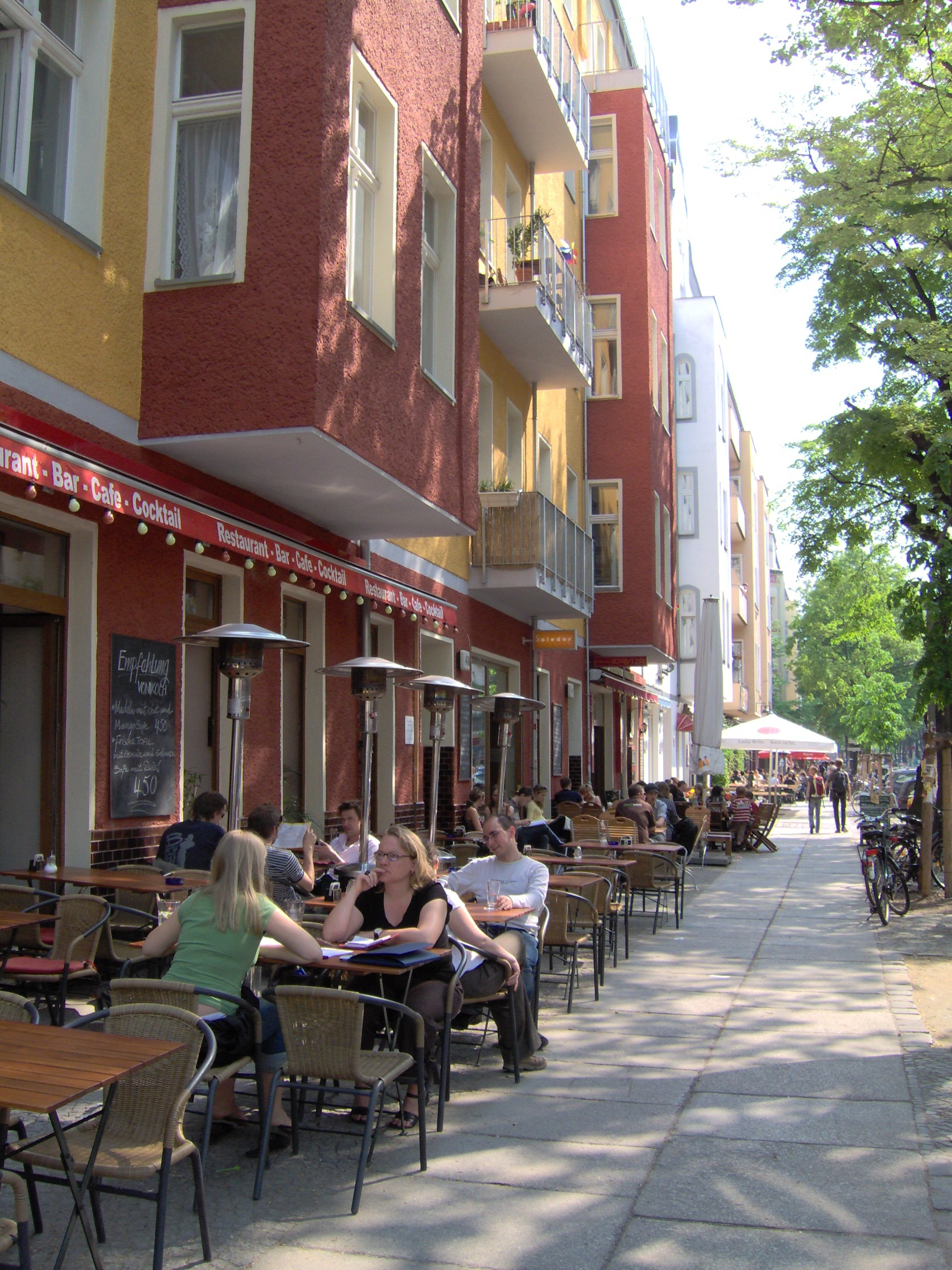
Simon-Dach-Straße is a popular destination, with numerous bars.

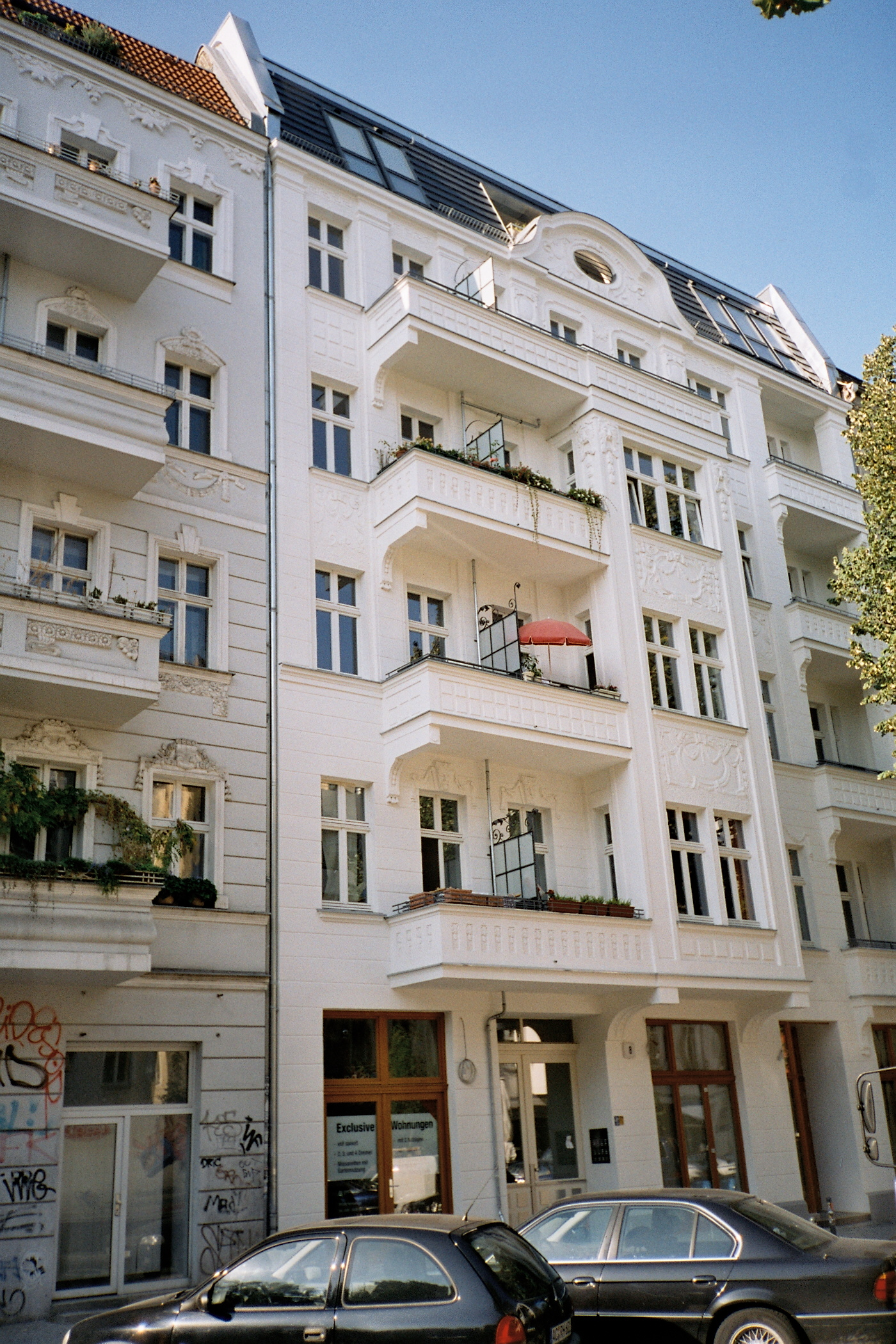
Jugendstil house in the Simon-Dach-Straße

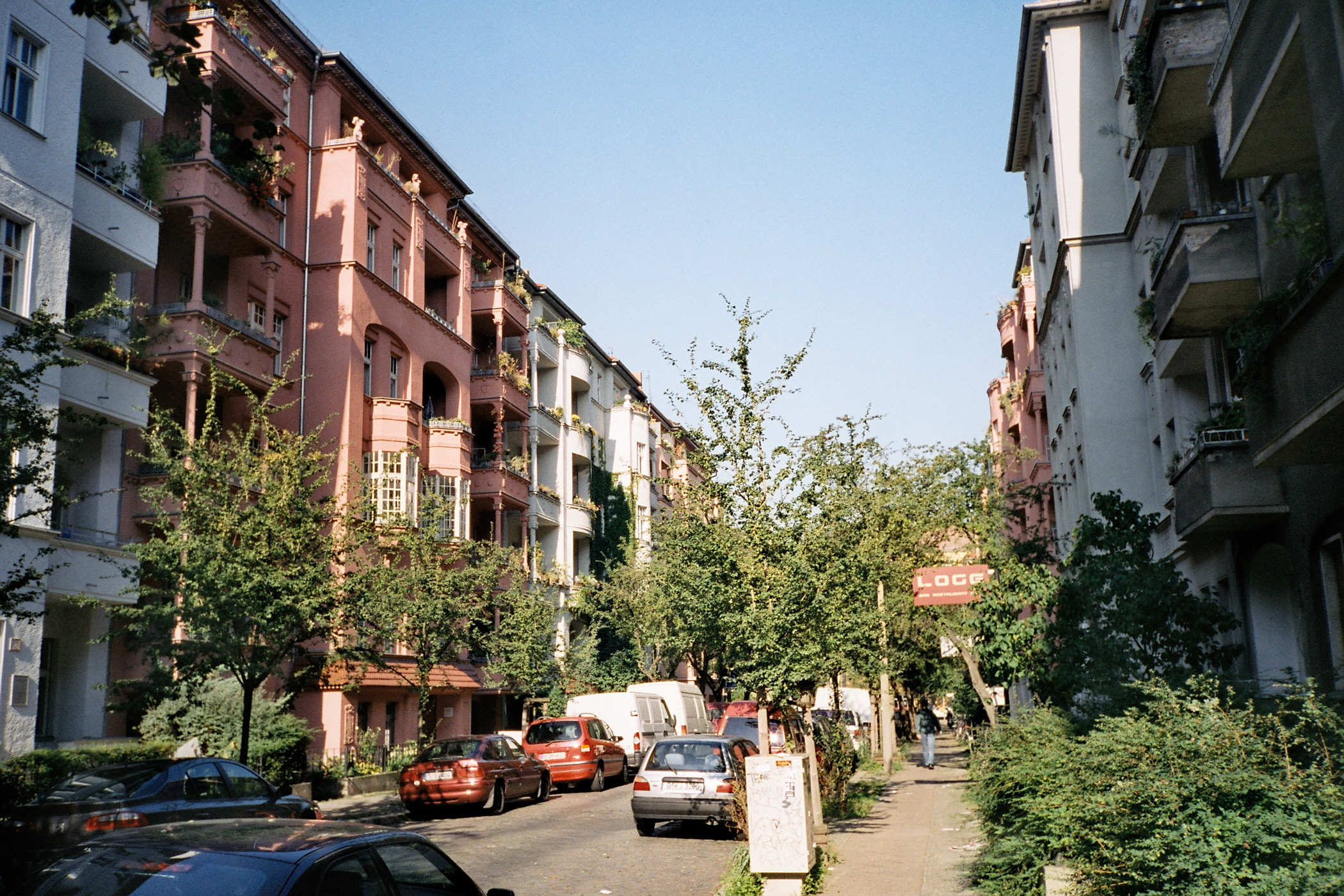
The Knorrpromenade

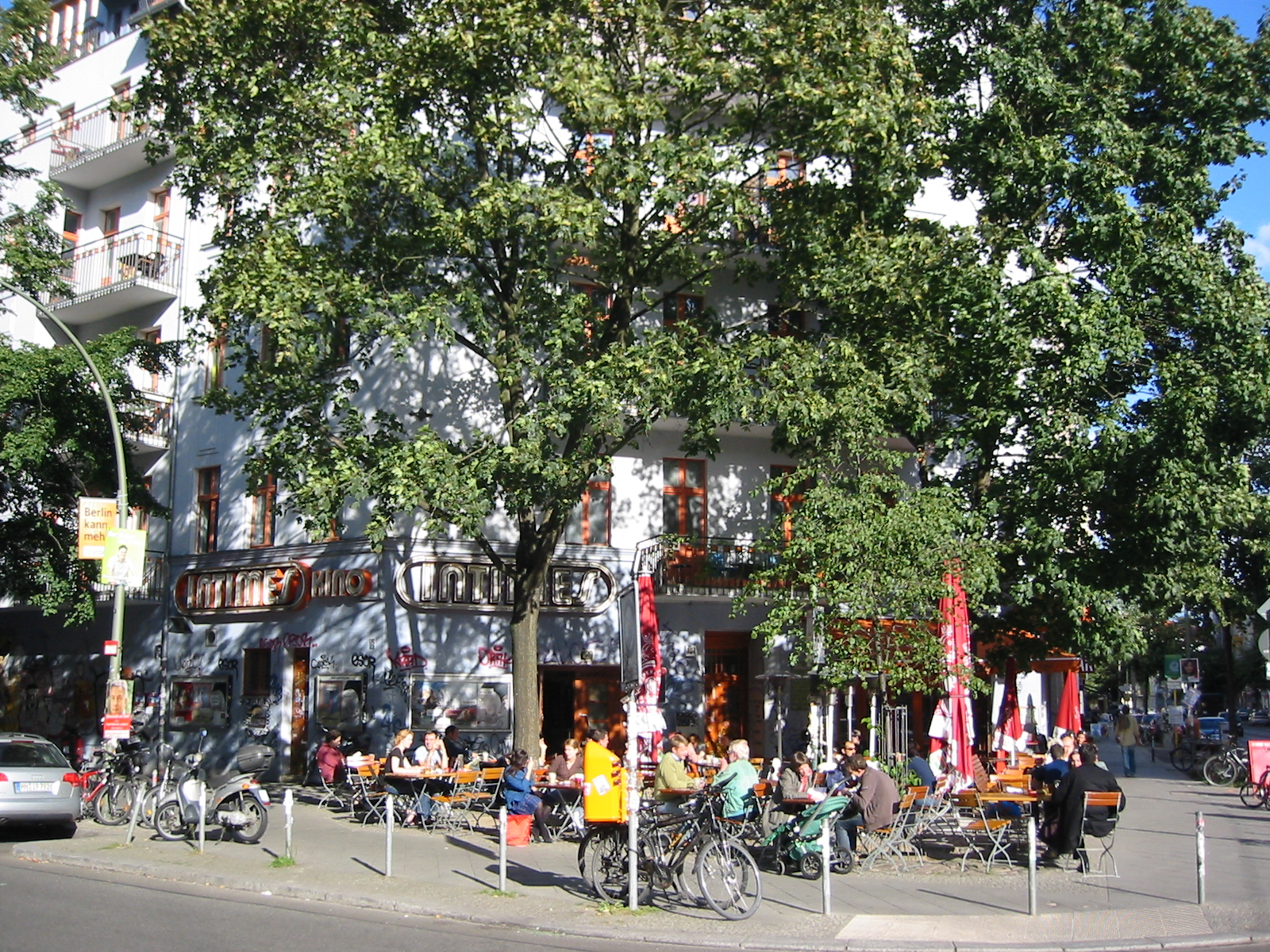
The small cinema "Intimes," over 70 years old, on the corner of Boxhagener Straße and Simon-Dach Straße

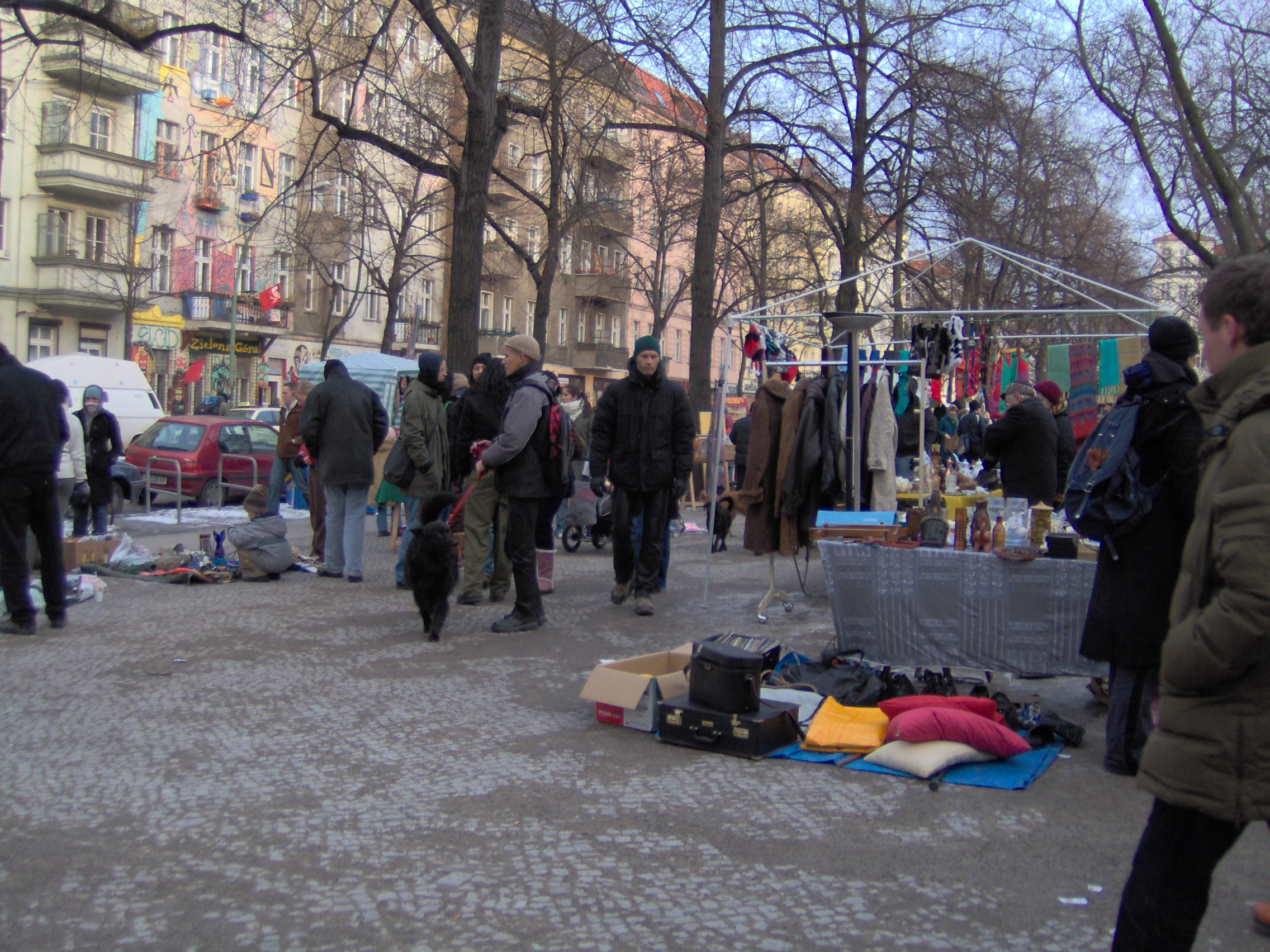
A popular flea market takes place every Sunday on Boxhagener Platz.

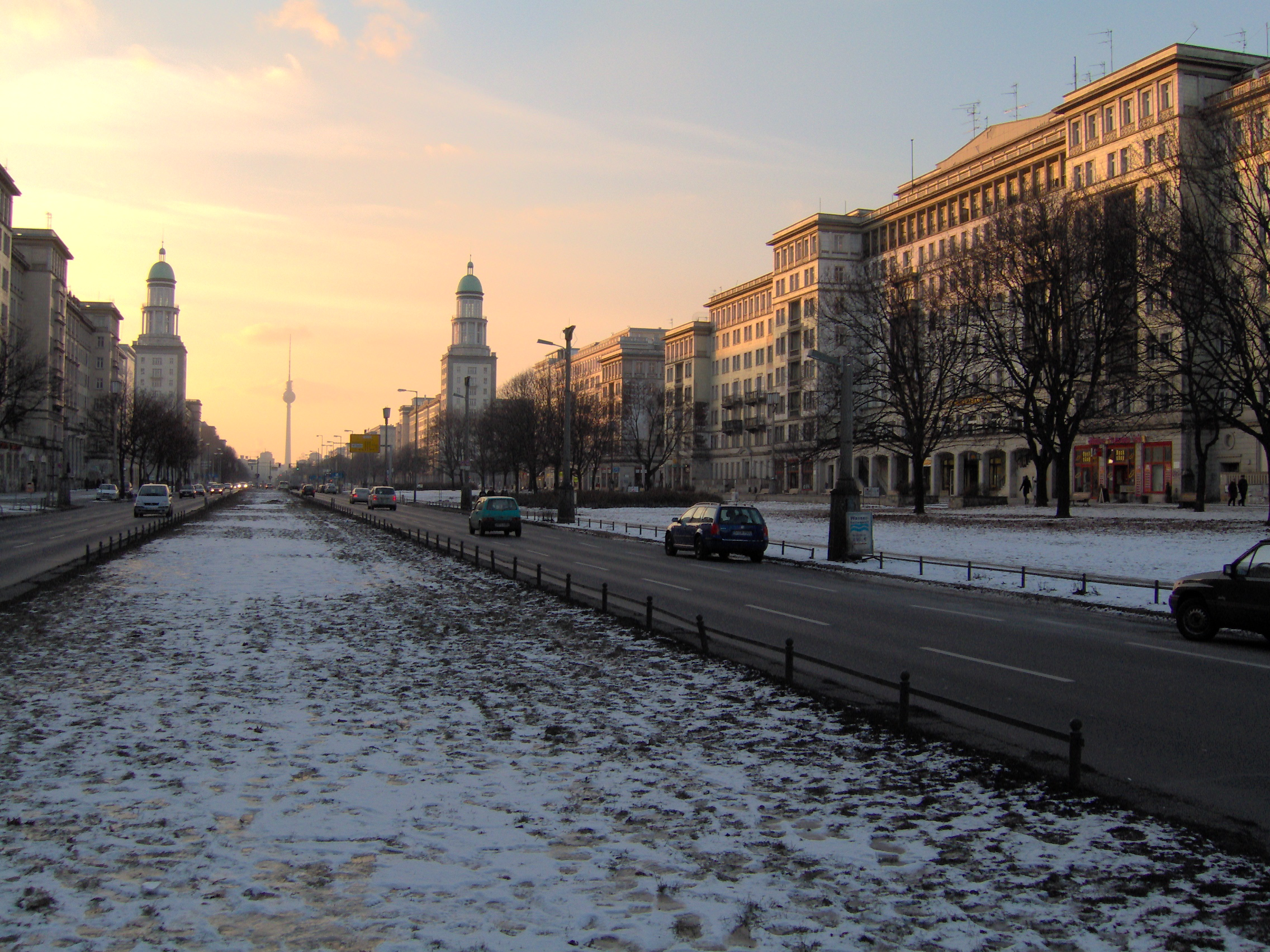
Frankfurter Allee, looking west, with the Fernsehturm at Alexanderplatz in the background

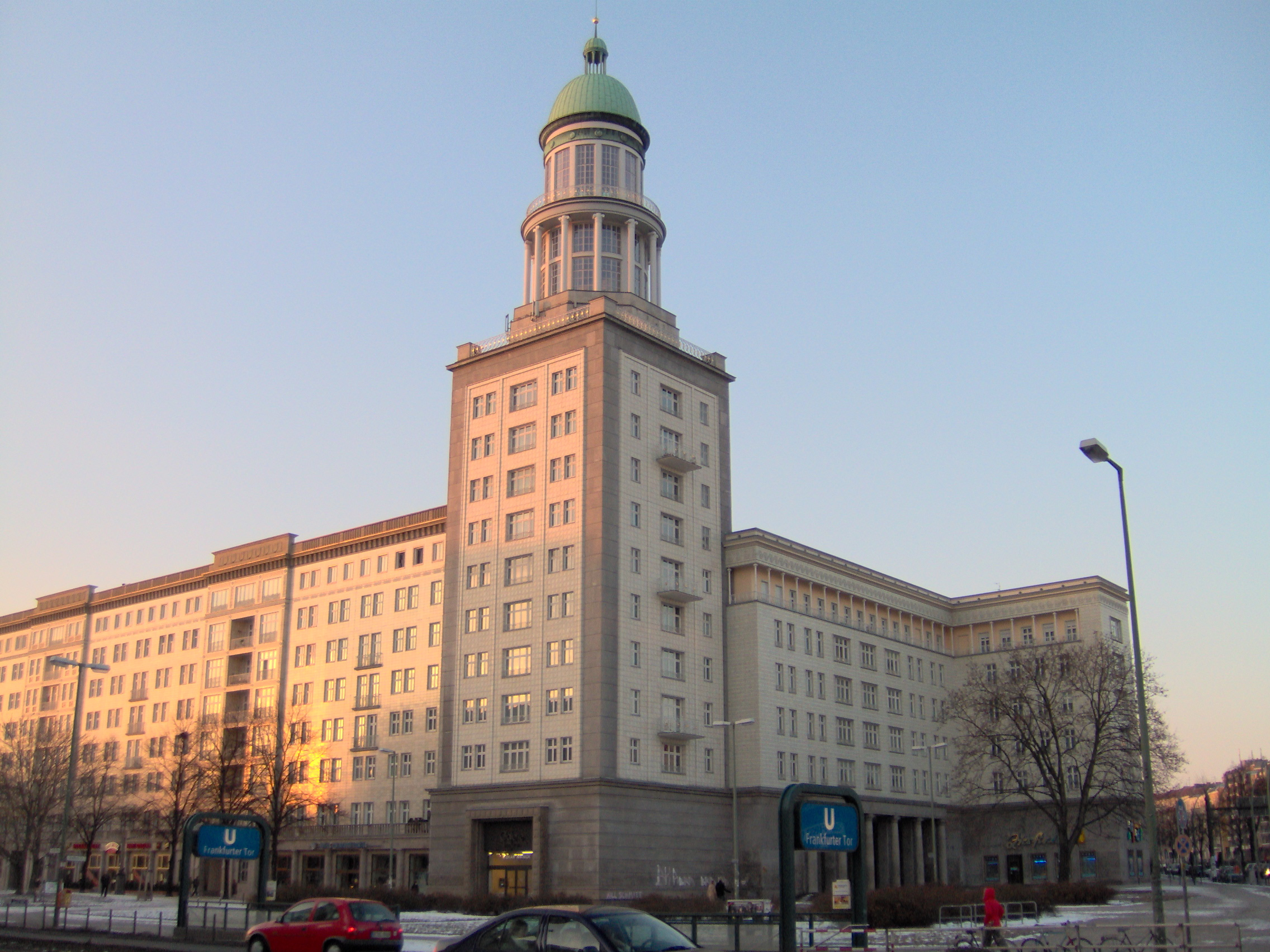
The north tower at Frankfurter Tor

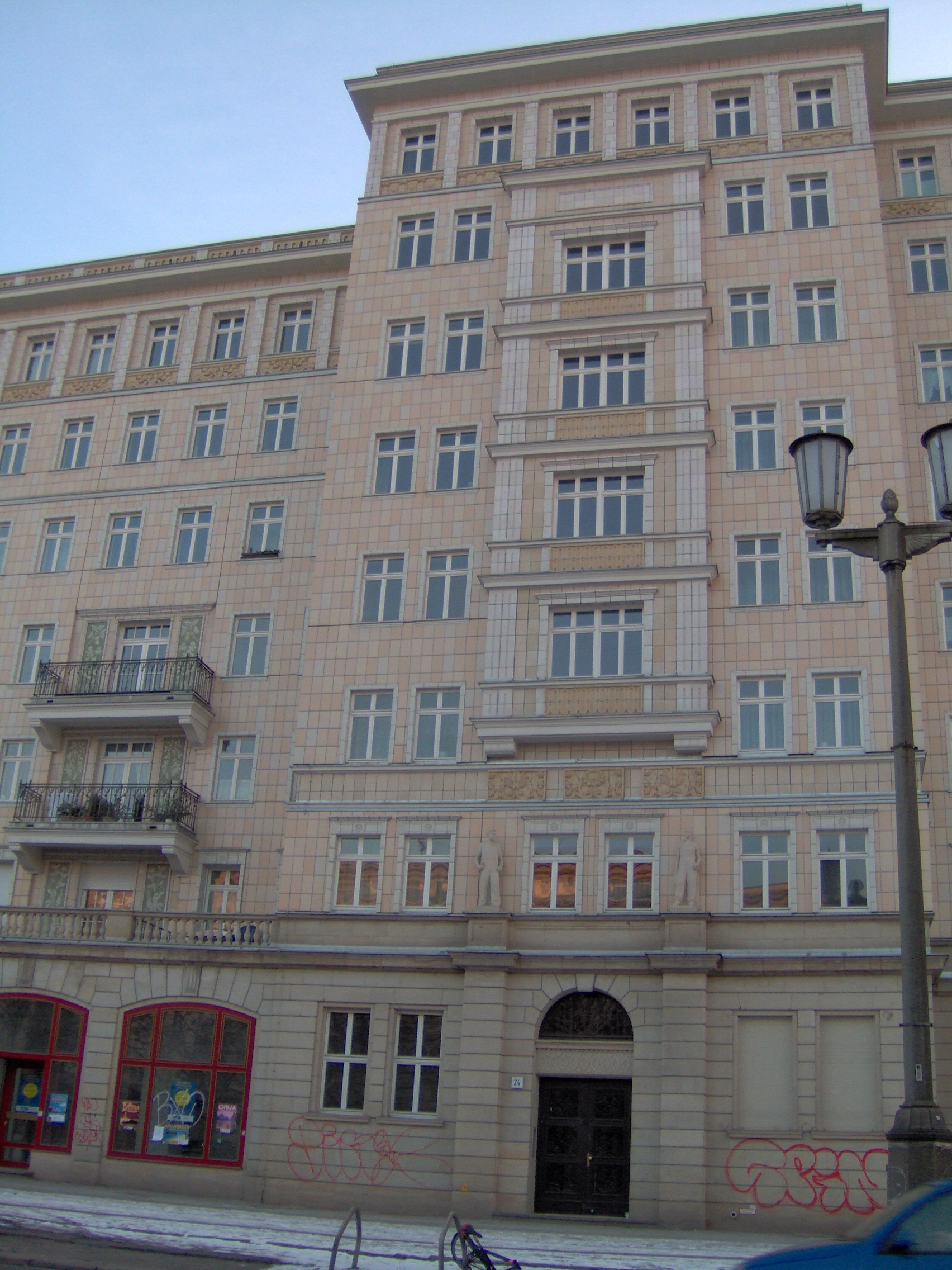
A closer look at a Frankfurt Allee façade, showing the neo-classical tilework

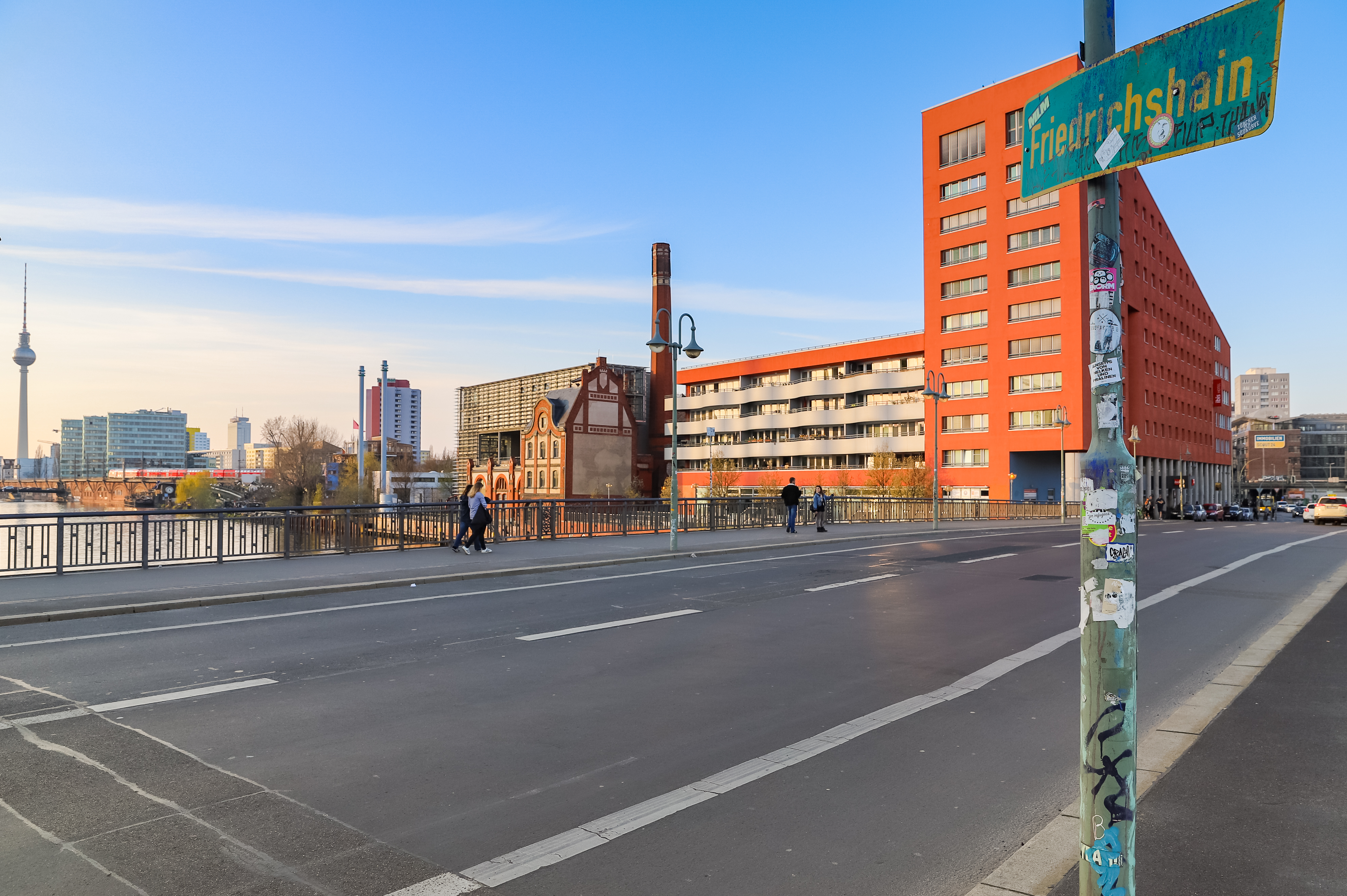
Berlin Friedrichshain

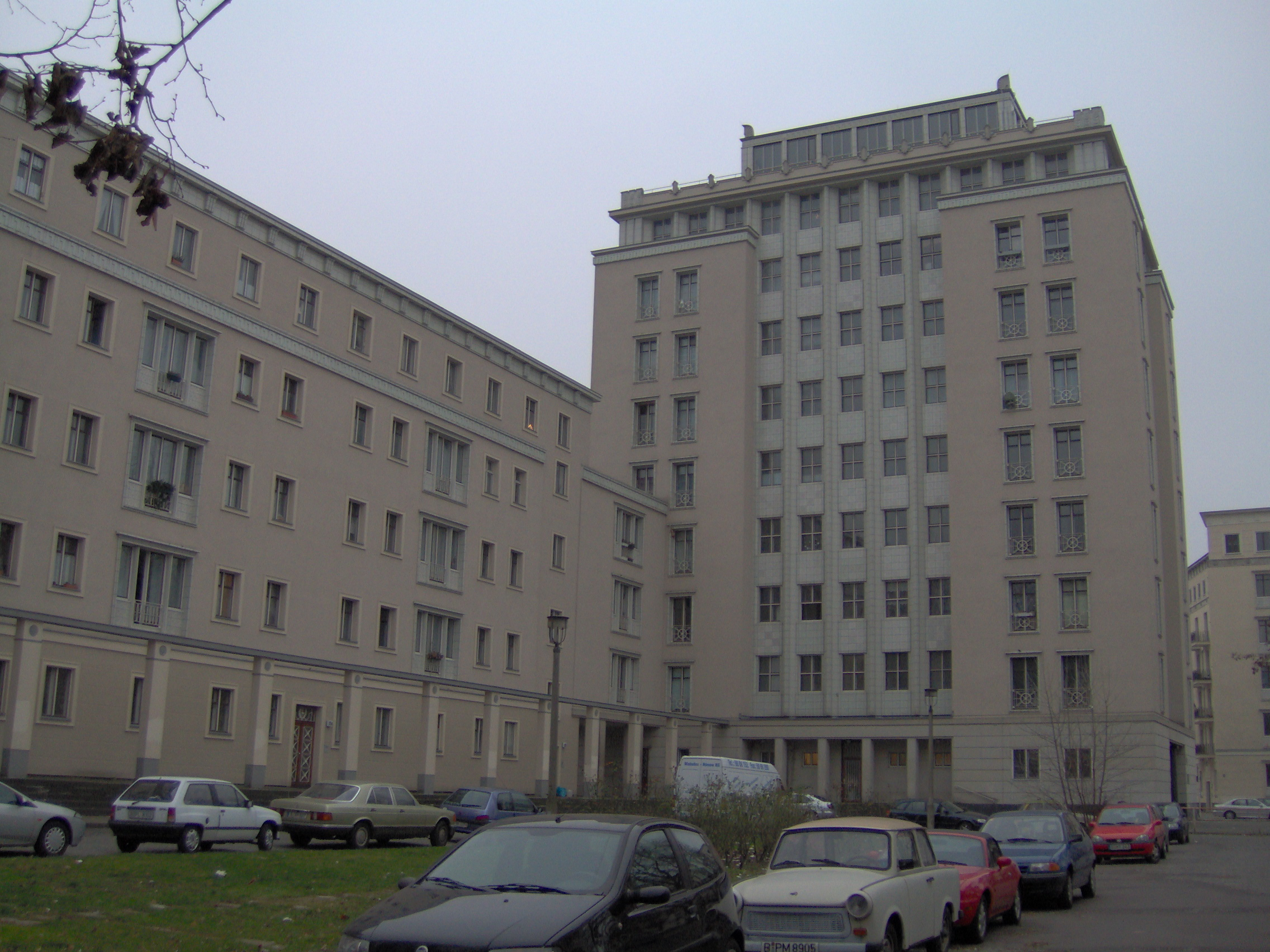
The Haus an der Weberwiese, the first high-rise apartment block in Berlin, built 1951

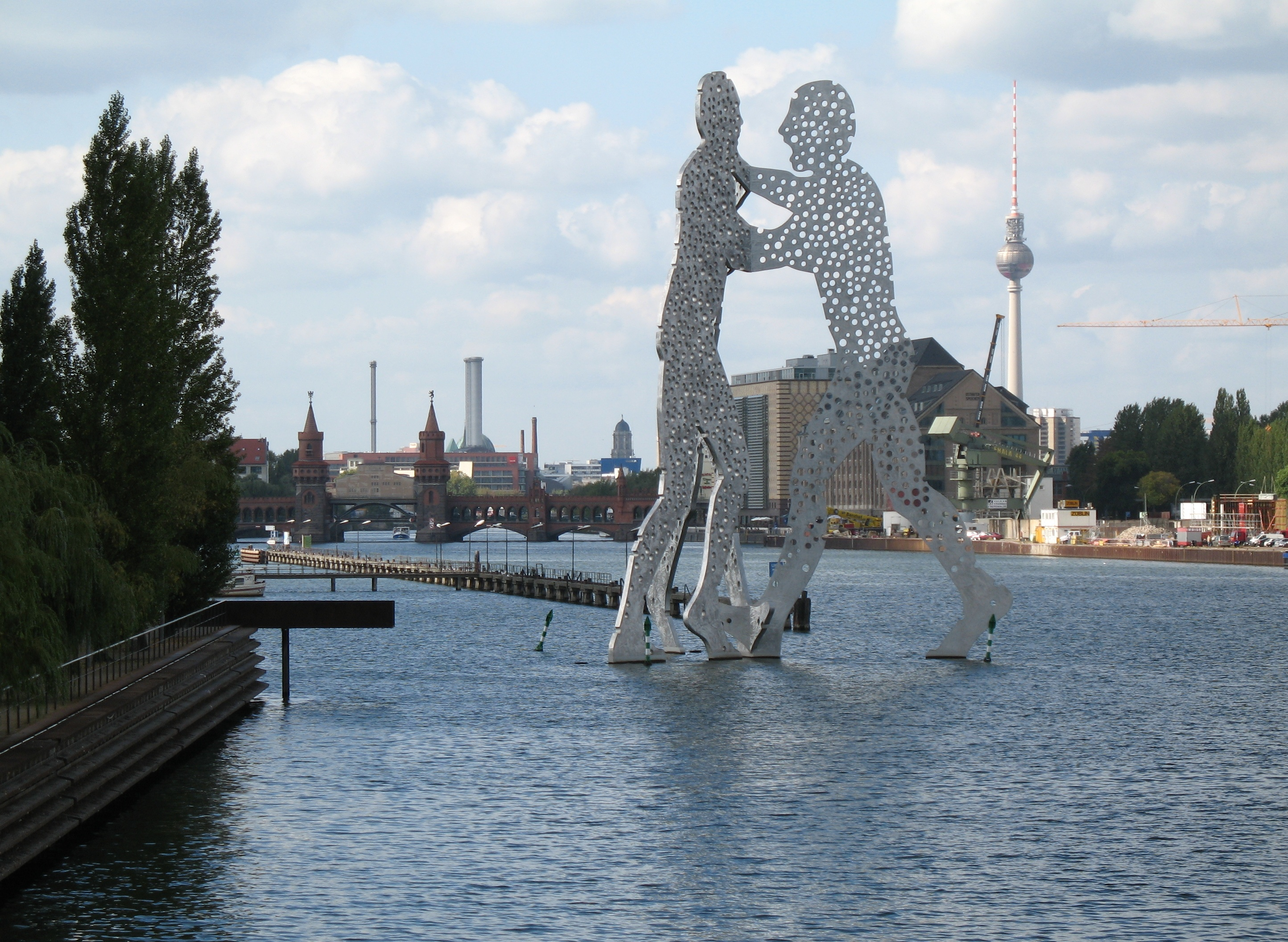
The "Molecule man", a big art work at the Berlin river Spree

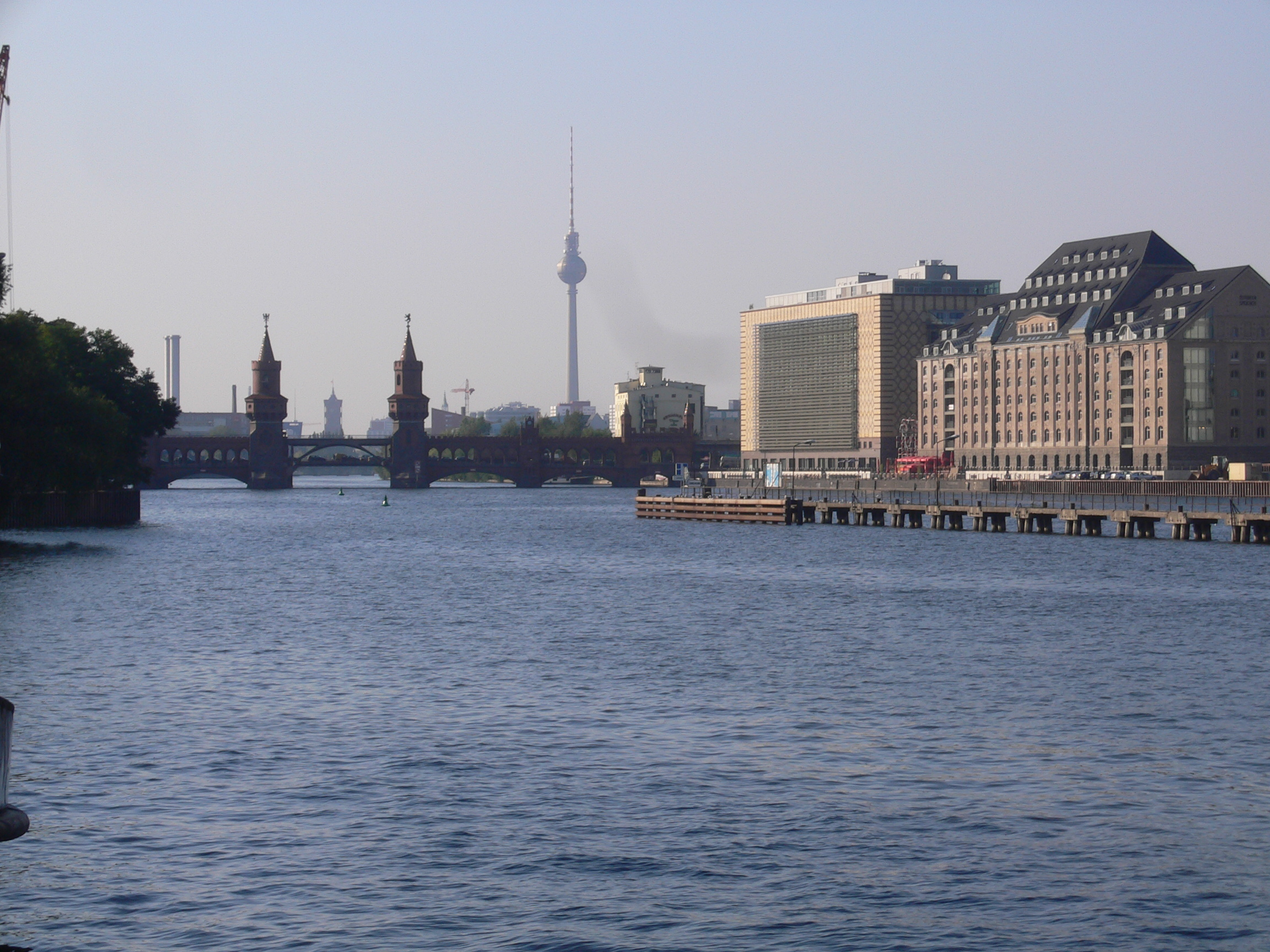
The Osthafen (east harbour) at the Spree between Friedrichshain and Kreuzberg. In the background the Oberbaumbrücke and the Fernsehturm.

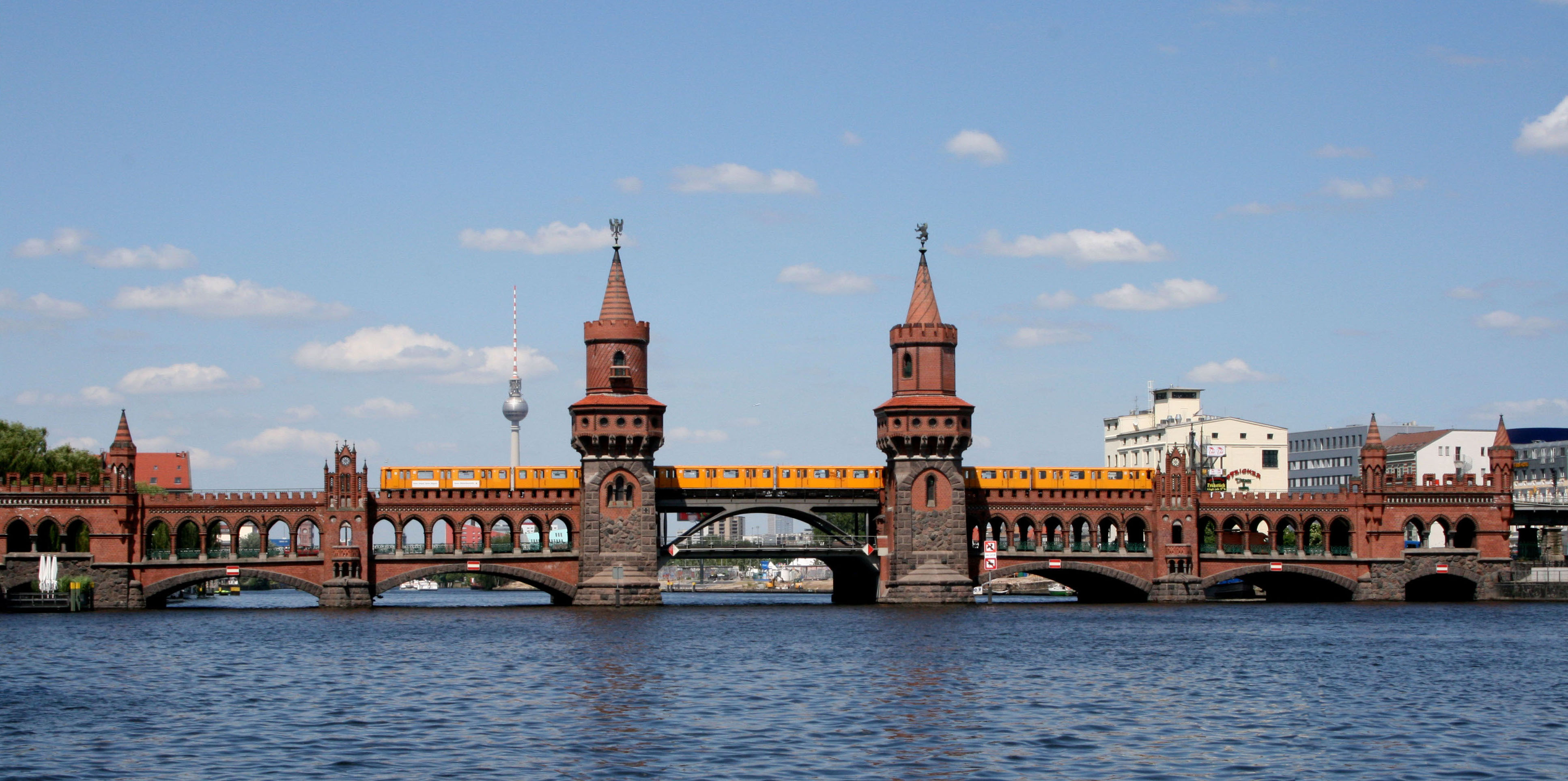
The Oberbaumbrücke and the waters of the Spree belong to Friedrichshain.

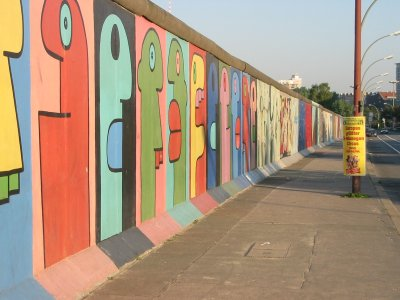
The East Side Gallery is the longest remaining part of the Berlin Wall.

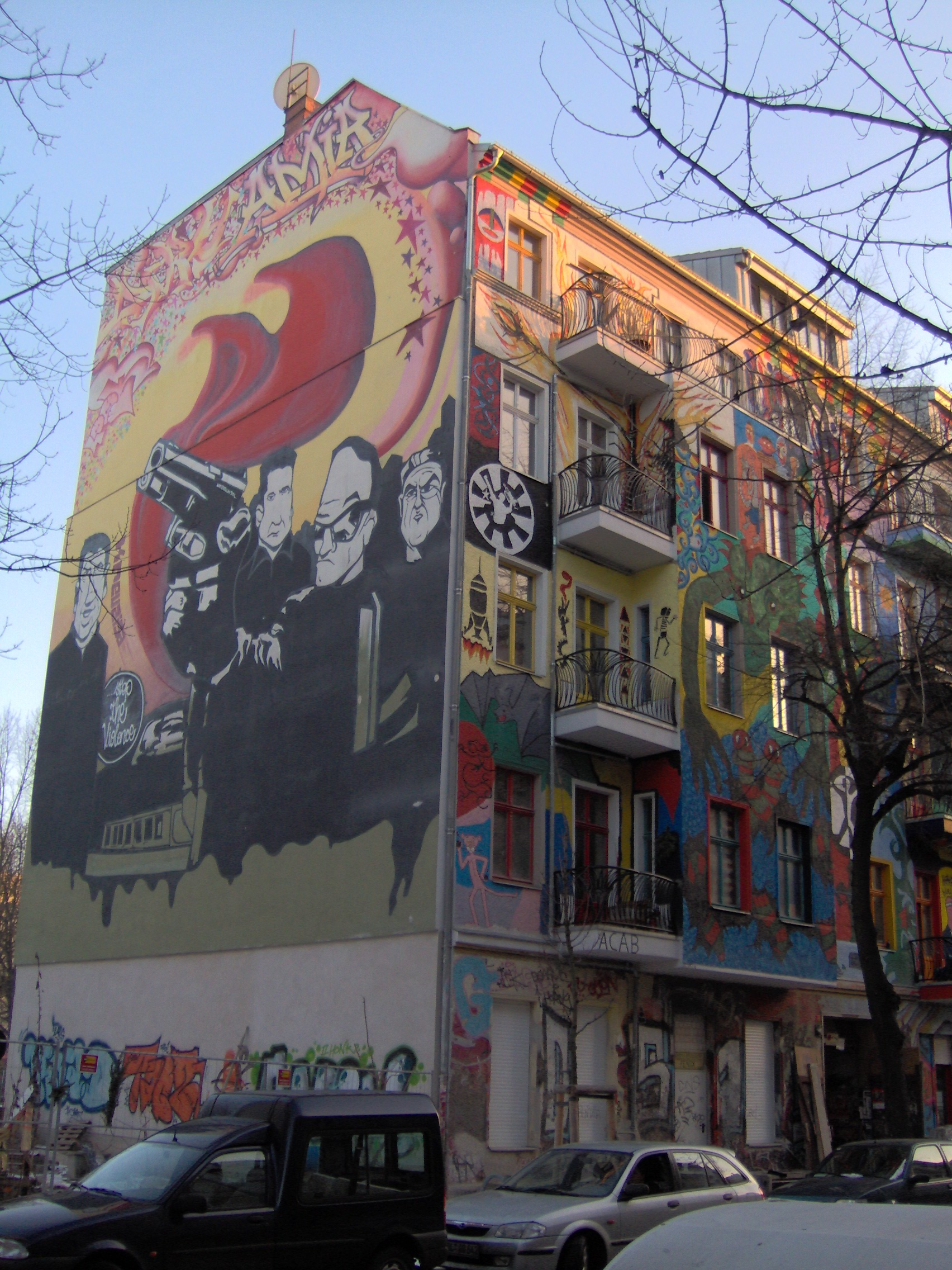
A squat on Kreuziger Straße, one of many such buildings in the district

== People ==
- Nina Hagen (born 1955), singer
- Maybrit Illner (born 1965), journalist and TV presenter
- Rita Thomas (1931–2018), LGBTQ activist.

== See also ==
- Flakturm II - Friedrichshain
- Berlin-Friedrichshain-Kreuzberg – Prenzlauer Berg East
