= Kiez =

German concept of a small community within a larger town

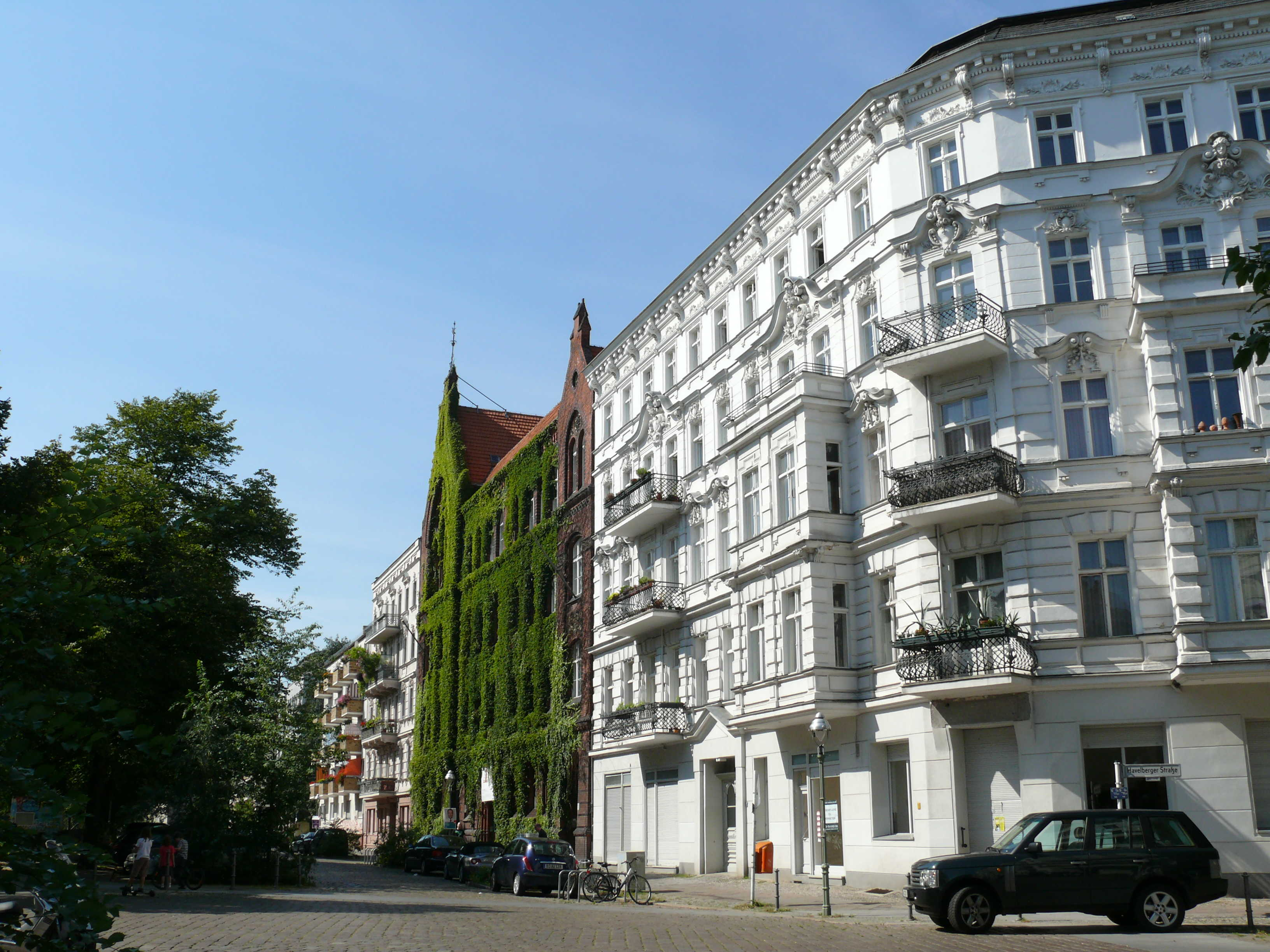
Stephankiez in Berlin-Moabit

Kiez (German pronunciation: [ˈkiːts]) (also: Kietz) is a German word for a city neighbourhood, a relatively small community within a larger town. The word is mainly used in Berlin and northern Germany. Similar quarters are called Veedel in Cologne and Grätzl in Vienna. The more standard German term for a neighborhood in the sense of "where one lives" is Viertel ('quarter').

== Original meaning and etymology ==
The word Kietz originated in the time of the eastward expansion of German settlers in the Middle Ages into West Slavic territories (Germania Slavica), when in many places both communities existed side by side. The word is possibly of Slavic origin (compare Slovak chyža 'hut, cottage', cf. Kessinians) and referred to a Slavic settlement (typically of fishermen) near a German town. Some placenames are reminiscent of this meaning, for example Küstrin-Kietz or the Kietz quarter of Berlin-Köpenick.

Medieval Kietz settlements were first documented in the 14th century. They were often located near a castle or a river crossing and initially inhabited by Slavic vassals ("Wends"). They were prevalent in the Margraviate of Brandenburg as well as in Mecklenburg and in the Duchy of Pomerania. For a long time Kietze formed a distinct community beside the neighbouring peasant villages, though evidence of a specific Slavic population becomes rare in the course of an increasing Germanisation. From the late 18th century onwards, the denotation Kietz was generally applied to fishermen's villages and remote settlements. In its transferred sense, the word became a (sometimes mocking) denotation for Berlin neighbourhoods.

== Modern meaning ==
A "Kiez" is never originally defined by the municipality or government, but rather by the inhabitants, and therefore doesn't necessarily coincide with administrative divisions. In some cases, however, such definitions have been picked up in official documents, this including State legislation.

In Berlin the term usually has a positive connotation, as inhabitants often identify with the "Kiez" they live in. There is a rising number of approximately 20 unofficial "Kiez"-areas in Berlin, most often in and around the city centre. A Berliner "Kiez" usually consists mainly of pre-war buildings and upholds its own commercial and cultural infrastructure. Outside Berlin, "Kiez" may be considered by some as somewhat slangy.

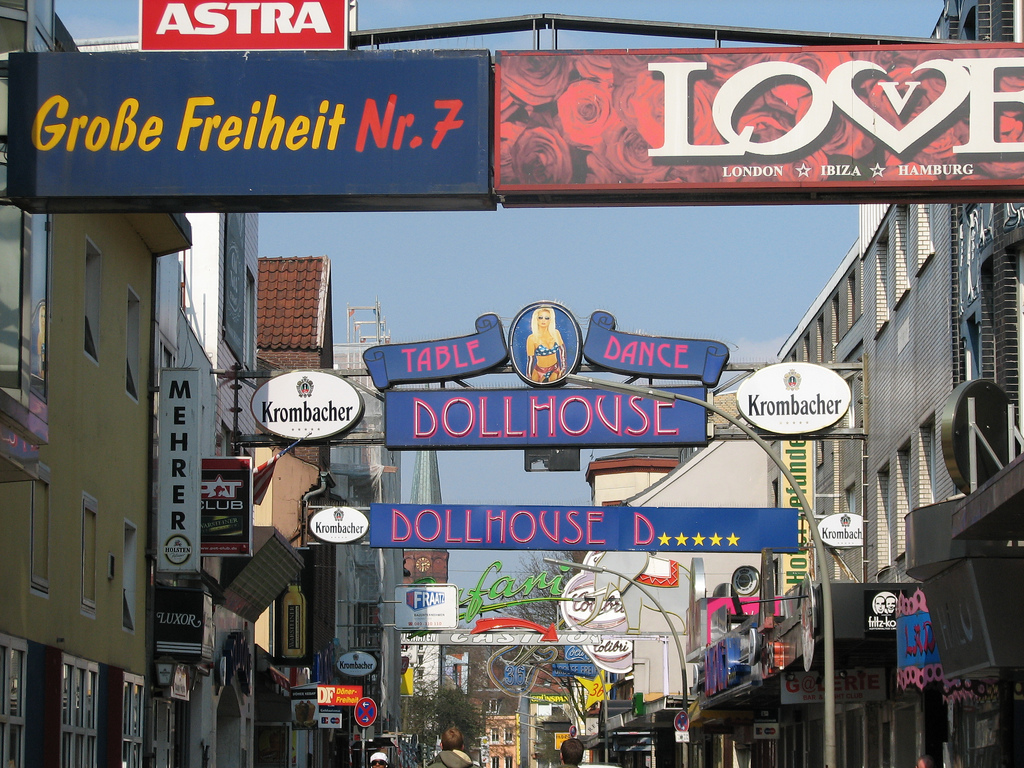
At the famous Kiez of Hamburg in St. Pauli

In Hamburg, der Kiez refers to the area around the Reeperbahn in the St. Pauli quarter, which is the city's nightlife and red-light district. It is the most well known "Kiez" in Germany and is sometimes mistakenly considered to be the first or original "Kiez". In other towns, such as Hanover, red-light districts are sometimes referred to as the "Kiez" following Hamburg's example. Also in smaller cities, some districts may be referred to as a "Kiez", especially when there are vital scenes of culture, pubs and clubs – an example being the KTV, a district of Rostock.
