= Neighbourhood unit =

Concept in urban planning; a city's "building block"

Generally the concept of the neighborhood unit, crystallised from the prevailing social and intellectual attitudes of the early 1900s by Clarence Perry, is an early diagrammatic planning model for residential development in metropolitan areas. It was designed by Perry to act as a framework for urban planners attempting to design functional, self-contained and desirable neighbourhoods in the early 20th century in industrialising cities. It continues to be utilised (albeit in progressive and adapted ways, such as in New Urbanism), as a means of ordering and organising new residential communities in a way which satisfies contemporary "social, administrative and service requirements for satisfactory urban existence".

== History ==
Clarence Perry's conceptualisation of the neighbourhood unit evolved from his idea to provide a planning formula for the arrangement and distribution of playgrounds in the New York region. The necessity for such a formula was attributed to the rise of the automobile in the early 20th century. During a period where road sense had not yet amalgamated within the social conscious, and many of the urban tools we now use to manage the dangers of vehicular traffic did not yet widely exist (such as pedestrian crossings, traffic lights and road signs), developing cities such as New York, which embraced the motor car, suffered street fatality rates in excess of one child a day.

Perry conceived of neighbourhoods in this time period as islands locked amidst a burgeoning sea of vehicular traffic, a dangerous obstacle which prevented people from safely walking to nearby playgrounds and amenities. Perry's neighbourhood unit concept began as a means of combating this obstacle. Ultimately, however, it evolved to serve a much broader purpose of providing a discernible identity for the concept of the "neighborhood" while offering to designers a framework for dividing the city into smaller subareas (suburbs).

While there is evidence that the concept of the neighbourhood unit emerged as early as 1923, at a joint meeting of the National Community Center Association and the American Sociological Society in Washington, D.C., it was the publication of Clarence Perry's paper in the 1929 Regional Plan of New York and Its Environs which led to its promotion as a planning tool. Titled "The Neighborhood Unit, a Scheme for Arrangement for the Family-Life Community", Clarence Perry's monograph offered in concrete terms a diagrammatic model of the ideal layout for a neighborhood of a specified population size. This model provided specific guidelines for the spatial distribution of residences, community services, streets and businesses.

Perry's concept of the neighbourhood unit employed a variety of institutional, social, and physical design principles, influenced by such popular notions in the 1920s as the separation of vehicular and pedestrian traffic as well as arterial boundaries demarcating the inwardly focused neighbourhood cell from the greater urban lattice. The cellular nature of the neighbourhood unit allowed it to be utilised as a building block in the development of neighbourhood arrays, leading to its systematic modular usage during periods of rapid residential expansion in many countries across the globe.

While Perry's name is most commonly associated with the notion of the neighbourhood unit, the idea of "re-defining and re-planning the city of the basis of neighbourhoods," was not Perry's in isolation. In a paper on the Neighbourhood Unit, Lewis Mumford considers the neighbourhood as it is organically experienced as well as the various theoretical and practical influences that lead to Perry's formalisation of the neighbourhood unit as an urban planning mechanism. Mumford credits Perry as taking "the fact of the neighbourhood... and showing how, through deliberate design, it could be transformed into what he called a neighbourhood unit, the modern equivalent of a medieval quarter or parish: a unit that would now exist, not merely on spontaneous or instinctual basis."

William E. Drummond – a central architect in Frank Lloyd Wright's studio between 1899 and 1909 – defined the ‘Neighbourhood Unit’ within his submission to the Chicago City Club's planning competition of 1912. The competition wanted to address "the theoretical and practical parameters, social and physical, of a micro-community in a suburban context with a focus on housing," calling for proposals for a ‘quarter-section’ site south of central Chicago. Drummond's plan advocated for the neighbourhood unit to be the organising basis of the whole city, to be "regarded as a unit in the social and political structure of the city."

The competition was largely a reaction to the squalid urban living conditions in the early part of the twentieth-century. It was part of the larger progressive and reformist era in American politics. Progressives saw the slums as a consequence of corruption and exploitation which they believed could be overcome through local political activation. Drummond was influenced by notable sociologist Charles Cooley, whom he credited in his submission, stating that "in the social and political organization of the city [the neighbourhood] is the smallest local unit." These sociological and political foundations are interesting when considered against the various applications and permeations of neighbourhood planning (see Urban Application).

== Principles ==
The neighbourhood unit was conceived as a comprehensive physical planning tool, to be utilised for designing self-contained residential neighbourhoods which promoted a community-centric lifestyle, away from the "noise of the trains, and out of sight of the smoke and ugliness of industrial plants" emblematic of an industrialising New York City in the early 1900s.

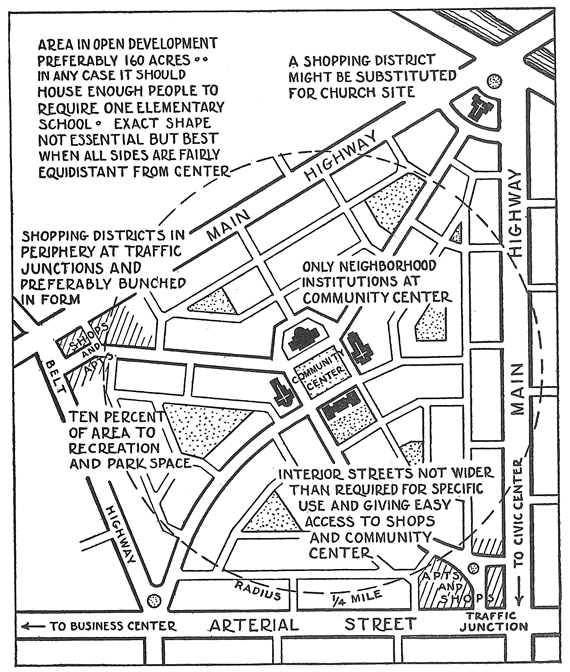
A diagram of Clarence Perry's neighbourhood unit, illustrating the spatiality of the core principles of the concept, from the New York Regional Survey, Vol 7. 1929

The core principles of Perry's Neighbourhood Unit were organised around several physical design ideals:

Center the school in the neighbourhood so that a child's walk to school is only about one quarter of a mile and no more than one half mile and can be achieved without crossing a major arterial street. Size the neighbourhood to sufficiently support a school, between 5,000 and 9,000 residents, approximately 160 acres at a density of ten units per acre. Implement a wider use of the school facilities for neighbourhood meetings and activities, constructing a large play area around the building for use by the entire community.

Place arterial streets along the perimeter so that they define and distinguish the "place" of the neighborhood and by design eliminate unwanted through-traffic from the neighborhood. In this way, major arterials define the neighborhood, rather than divide it through its heart.

Design internal streets using a hierarchy that easily distinguishes local streets from arterial streets, using curvilinear street design for both safety and aesthetic purposes. Streets, by design, would discourage unwanted through traffic and enhance the safety of pedestrians.

Restrict local shopping areas to the perimeter or perhaps to the main entrance of the neighborhood, thus excluding nonlocal traffic destined for these commercial uses that might intrude on the neighborhood.

Dedicate at least 10 percent of the neighborhood land area to parks and open space, creating places for play and community interaction"

The neighbourhood unit was embraced for its community idealism, and many of the public sectors in those countries which were exposed to the theorem have since adopted its purposes of protecting public health and considering the safety and welfare of citizens. Furthermore, private developers and investors continue to construct and fund planned communities based upon many of the concept's tenets, responding to consumer demand for the community intimacy associated with living with heteronormative homo reciprocans of similar socioeconomic status. These attractive qualities of the neighbourhood unit are referred to by Allaire as "reflecting a nostalgia for rural living."

== Urban application ==
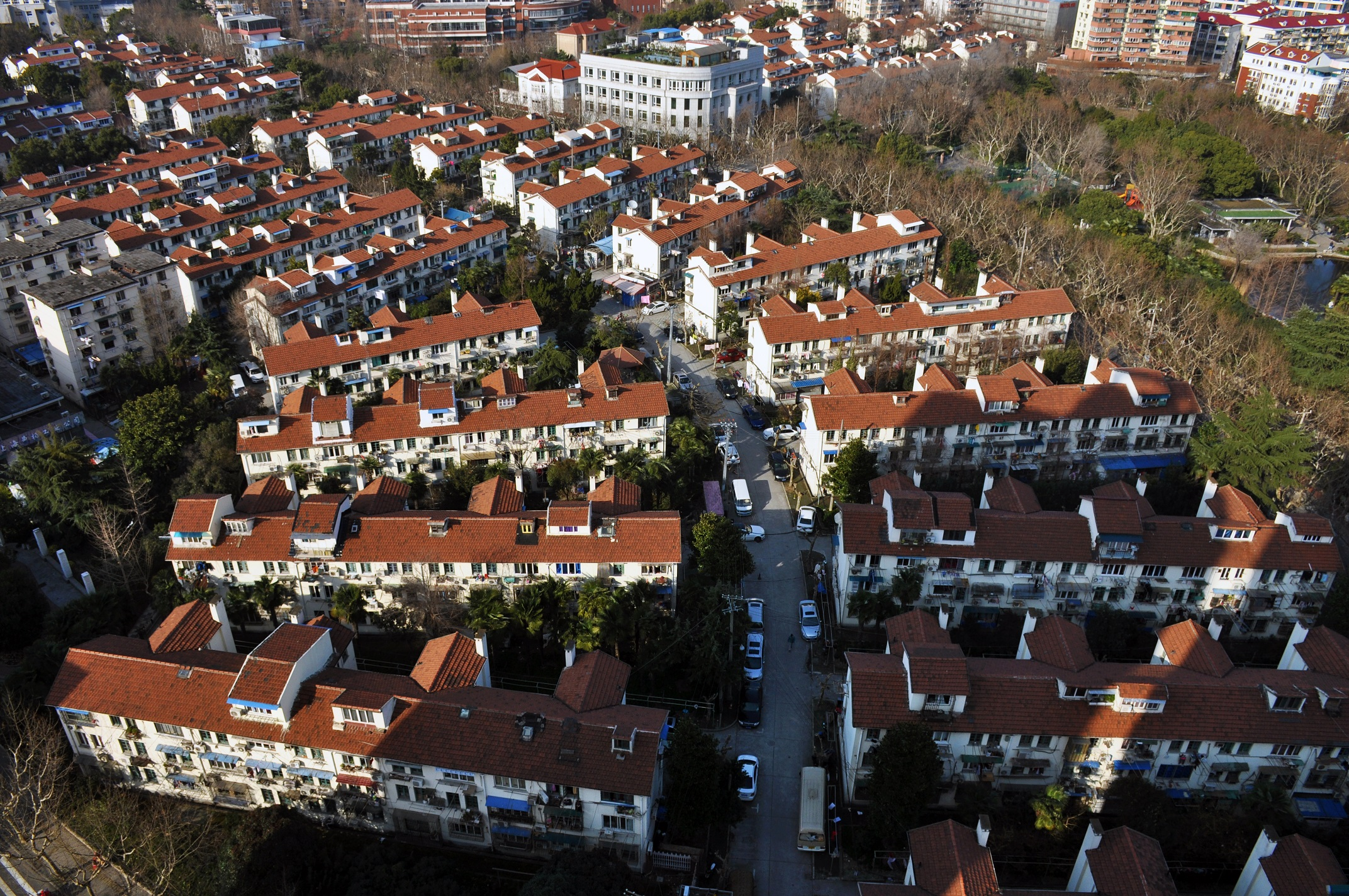
The Caoyang New Village in Shanghai developed based on the neighborhood unit concept.

The concept of the neighbourhood unit is a notable aspect of designs of the new town movement. The neighbourhood unit seems to have had an uneasy relationship to the Garden City Movement of the same period (see garden suburbs). Raymond Unwin – an architect working for Ebenezer Howard – was an advocate of the neighbourhood unit.

Mumford observes a bidirectional relationship between the neighbourhood unit realtor's residential subdivision model. Clarence Perry in fact resided within Forest Hills Gardens at the time he presented his treatise on neighbourhoods in 1923. While spatial elements of neighbourhoods such as Forest Hills Gardens or Westwood Highlands are in keeping with those championed by reformers and progressive planners, these suburbs do not have common ideological origins. Instead, realtors playing the role of "community builder" had quite insidious ideas about public space, community inclusion, and political agency.

The use of deed restrictions by neighbourhood corporations in the early 1900s (and beyond) has been linked to ongoing racial segregation in the United States. The use of the ‘neighbourhood unit’ in this way emphasises exclusion rather than inclusion as initially intended. Traces of such exclusion remain evident within the streetscape of neighbourhoods such as Forest Hill Gardens with signs delineating the ownership of commonly considered public space. In contemporary Melbourne, Australia, the Owners Corporations Act of 2006 enables access restrictions upon facilities generally considered public. Western Leisure Management makes this explicit on their website relating to use of facilities within the ‘un-gated’ neighbourhoods they manage: "These estates are part of an Owners Corporation and the facilities within are accessible by Residents Only and are not open to the general public."

In the Soviet Union, the neighborhood unit schema was widely criticized and disfavored for its waste of space and "bourgeois" nature during the Stalin era. However, the idea of Microdistrict, proposed by the Soviet planners in 1950s, had been practiced in several communist countries and was similar to the neighborhood unit schema.

== Sociological implications ==
The concept of the neighbourhood unit historically corresponds to activities of the American school of urban studies and ecology called the Chicago school, operating mostly in the 1920s and 1930s. It is closely linked to the activities of Jane Jacobs, American urbanist and humanist in the field of migrant integration and child labour force.

The schema of neighbourhood unit further refers to Charles Horton Cooley´s theory of primary groups and the concept of neighbourhood as a type of residential community.

The concept of the neighbourhood unit should have enhanced the feeling of identification with the environment for the incomers, supported their spatial integration, fostered social cohesion to avoid social pathology, taking the form of alienation and civic indifference.

== Criticism ==
Several major criticisms of the neighborhood unit have been mentioned in planning literature. In the late 1940s the neighbourhood unit concept came under attack from Reginald Isaacs, then Director of Planning for Michael Reese Hospital in Chicago. Isaacs believed that the overwhelming endorsement of the neighbourhood unit as a "panacea for all urban ills" was misguided; suggesting that the mystical powers ascribed to the concept by its most enthusiastic adherents engendered a dangerously sectarian discourse surrounding its application.

Isaacs's critical commentary of the neighbourhood unit centred on its (mis)use as an instrument for the segregation of racial, ethnic, religious, and economic groups by private developers willing to utilise the gated-community aspects of the neighbourhood units physical design for this purpose. Supporting this argument, Isaacs pointed to examples of promotional material for new pre-planned neighbourhoods as well as excerpts from government planning reports and information provided by social scientists – all championing the neighbourhood unit as a bastion for the gentry, keeping excluded groups, as well as through-traffic, out.

Isaacs's argument became a rallying point for the collective opposition of the neighbourhood unit, as planners began to question the unintended consequences of its repeated use, its socially divisive nature and its emphasis on the physical environment as the sole determinant of wellbeing. In developed countries across the globe, the spread of urban systems which embrace obsolete or impractical uses of space in order to manifest a synthetic ‘rural’ community lifestyle is increasingly viewed as contrary to attempts toward sustainable metropolitan growth.

In the past, Isaacs's argument was weakened through its inability to provide an alternative framework for community planning. More recently in 2009, planning bodies internationally, both private and public, continue to adapt and make modular use of the neighbourhood unit when planning new communities. It is becoming increasingly difficult however, to mask the problems associated with the continued and ubiquitous use of variations on this model, and urban sprawl is proving to be one such problematic consequence of this usage facing many developed cities. It is becoming increasingly apparent that a rethinking of the current approach to planning new communities on the urban fringe, or in the redevelopment of existing neighbourhoods, is required to meet density goals and forge sustainable growth.
