= Clarence Perry =

American urban planner (1872–1944)

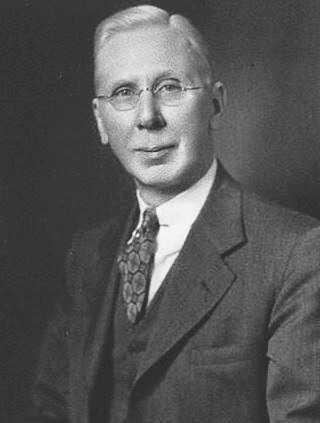
Clarence Perry, 1935

Clarence Arthur Perry (March 4, 1872 – September 6, 1944) was an American urban planner, sociologist, author, and educator. Perry devised the neighbourhood unit plan, a residential community scheme disseminated through the Regional Plan of New York and Its Environs in 1929 that influenced planning in US cities.

== Life ==
He was born in Truxton, New York. He later worked in the New York City planning department where he became a strong advocate of the neighborhood unit. He was an early promoter of neighborhood community and recreation centers.

He began his education as a student at Stanford University for two years then finished his degree at Cornell University in 1899. He was married to Dr. Julia St. John Wygant in 1901 with whom he had one daughter. In 1904 he continued at the Teachers College of Columbia University. From 1904–1905 he served as principal of the Ponce High School in Ponce, Puerto Rico, then became a special agent for the United States Immigration Commission from 1908 to 1909. During the summer of 1912, he served as a lecturer at New York University. During World War I he served overseas as a major then returned in 1924 as a lieutenant colonel in the reserves.

== Work ==
As a staff member of the New York Regional Plan and the City Recreation Committee, Perry formulated his early ideas about the neighbourhood unit and community life. In 1909 he became associated with the Russell Sage Foundation as associate director of recreation until 1937. His ideas were realized in neighborhoods like Radburn through the work of Clarence Stein.

He produced several books, many pamphlets and articles though is best remembered for his The Neighborhood Unit (The Neighbourhood Unit: From the Regional Survey of New York and Its Environs, Volume VII, Neighbourhood and Community Planning, 1929) and Housing for the Machine Age (1939).

== Death ==
He died on September 5, 1944, in New Rochelle, New York, at age 72. Was buried at Hillside Cemetery in Cortlandt Manor, New York.
