= Viertel (surname) =

Viertel is a surname. Notable people with the surname include:

- Berthold Viertel (1885–1953), Austrian screenwriter and film director
- Elisabeth Neumann-Viertel (1900–1994), Austrian actress
- Joel Viertel, director of the 2008 comedy film Strictly Sexual
- Peter Viertel (1920–2007), American author and screenwriter
- Salka Viertel (1889–1978), actress and screenwriter
