= Bombing of Berlin in World War II =

- Part of Strategic bombing during World War II
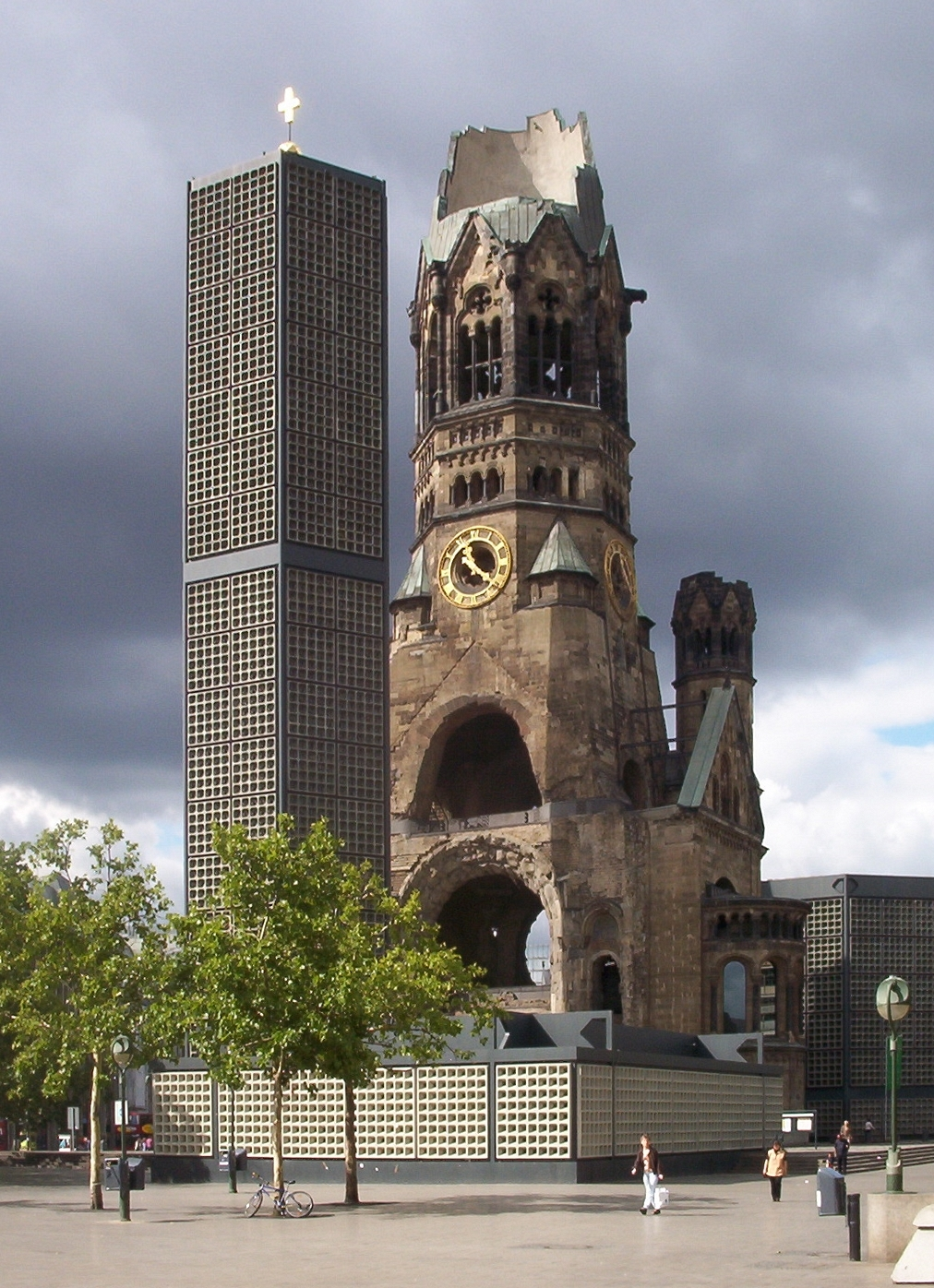
- The ruins of the Kaiser Wilhelm Memorial Church in Berlin, extensively damaged during the RAF bombing raid of 22–23 November 1943 and preserved as a monument
Date	7 June 1940 – 21 April 1945
Location	Berlin, Germany
Result	Heavy damage to the city; Soviet victory in the Battle of Berlin

Belligerents
United Kingdom; United States; Soviet Union; France	Germany

Units involved
Royal Air Force: RAF Bomber Command; US Army Air Force: 8th Air Force; 15th Air Force; Soviet Air Forces French Air Force	Luftwaffe: 1st Flak Division

Berlin, the capital of Germany, was subject to 363 air raids during the Second World War. It was bombed by the RAF Bomber Command between 1940 and 1945, the United States Army Air Forces' Eighth Air Force between 1943 and 1945, and the French Air Force in 1940 and between 1944 and 1945 as part of the Allied campaign of strategic bombing of Germany. It was also attacked by aircraft of the Red Air Force in 1941 and particularly in 1945, as Soviet forces closed on the city. British bombers dropped 45,517 tons of bombs, while American aircraft dropped 22,090.3 tons. As the bombings continued, more and more people fled the city. By May 1945, 1.7 million people (40% of the population) had fled.

== Prelude ==
When the Second World War began in 1939, US President Franklin D. Roosevelt issued a request to the major belligerents to confine their air raids to military targets. The French and the British agreed to abide by the request "upon the understanding that these same rules of warfare will be scrupulously observed by all of their opponents".

Initially the British had a policy of using aerial bombing only against military targets and/or infrastructure such as ports and railways of direct military importance. It was acknowledged that the aerial bombing of Germany would cause civilian casualties, but the British government was initially reluctanct to deliberately bomb civilian property outside combat zones as a military tactic. The policy was abandoned on 15 May 1940, two days after the German air attack on Rotterdam, when the Royal Air Force was given permission to attack targets in the Ruhr, including oil plants and other civilian industrial targets that aided the German war effort, such as blast furnaces that at night were self-illuminating. The first RAF raid on the interior of Germany took place on 19 March 1940 at Hörnum. On the night of 10–11 May 1940 the RAF bombed Dortmund.

Between 1939 and 1942, the policy of bombing only targets of direct military significance was gradually abandoned in favour of "area bombing", the large-scale bombing of German cities to destroy housing and civilian infrastructure. Although killing German civilians was never an explicit policy, it was obvious that area bombing would cause large-scale civilian casualties. With the technology available at the time, the precision bombing of military targets was possible only by daylight. It was difficult even then: day bomber raids by Bomber Command led to unacceptably high casualties and aircraft losses. Night bombing led to far lower losses but was of necessity indiscriminate, because navigation and bomb aiming were more difficult at night.

== 1940 to 1943 ==
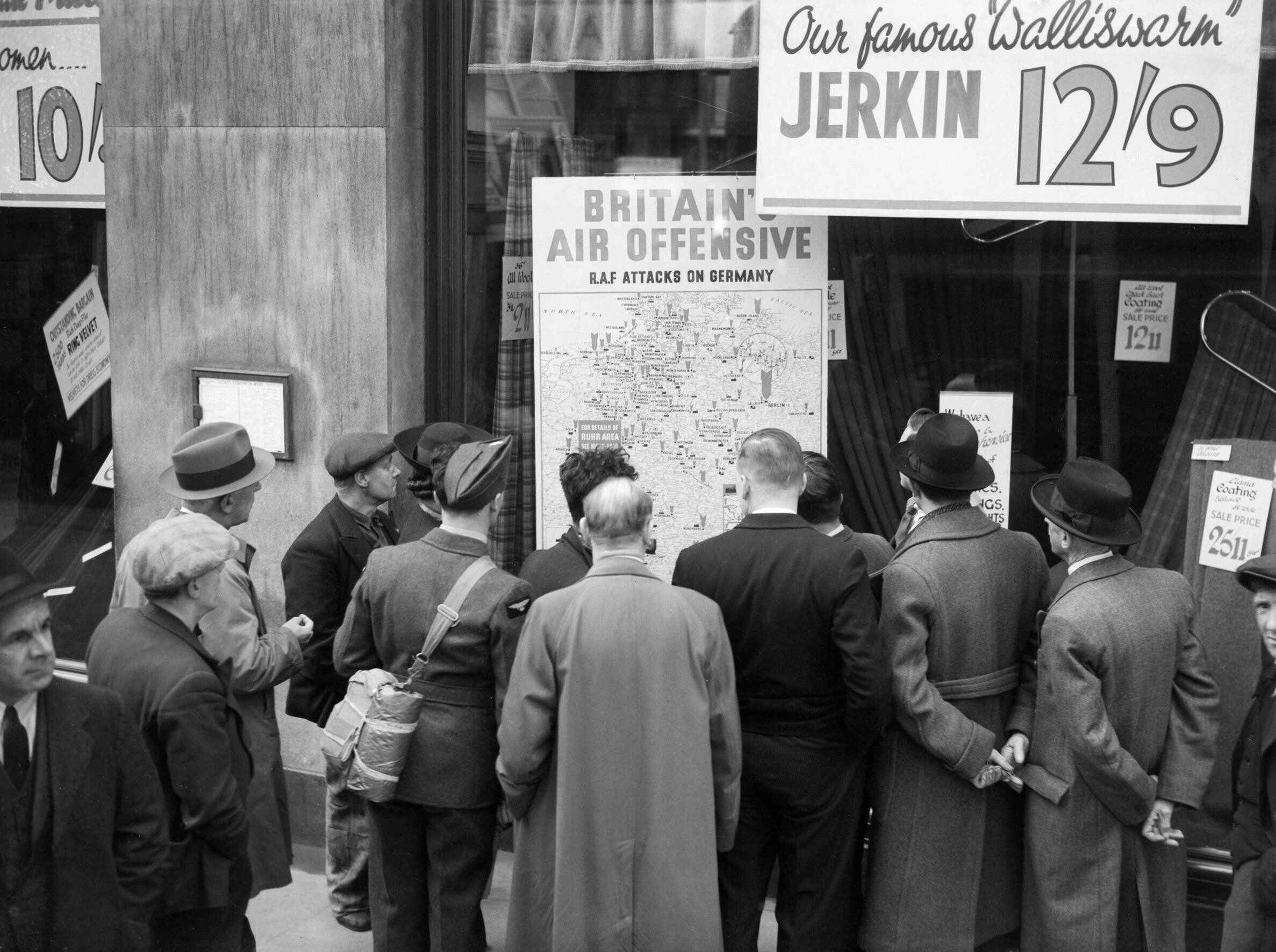
People in London look at a map illustrating how the RAF is striking back at Germany during 1940.

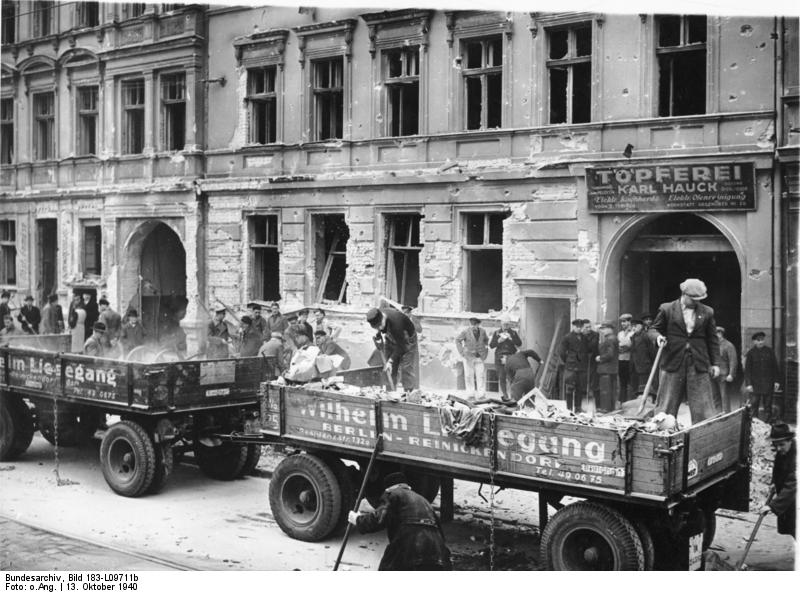
A work party clears rubble from an air raid on Berlin, 13 October 1940

The Jules Verne, a variant of the Farman F.220 of the French Naval Aviation, was the first Allied bomber to raid Berlin. On the night of 7 June 1940, it dropped eight bombs of 250 kg (550 lb) and eighty of 10 kg (22 lb) on the German capital.

Before 1941, Berlin, at 950 kilometres (590 mi) from London, was at the extreme range attainable by the British bombers then available to the Allied forces. It could be bombed only at night in summer when the days were longer and skies clear – which increased the risk to Allied bombers. The first RAF raid on Berlin took place on the night of 25 August 1940; 95 aircraft were dispatched to bomb Tempelhof Airport near the centre of Berlin and Siemensstadt, of which 81 dropped their bombs in and around Berlin, and while the damage was slight, the psychological effect on Hitler was greater. At the start of hostilities, the saying "if a single enemy bomber appears over Berlin, I want to be called Meier" made the rounds as attributed to Göring. When air raid sirens in Berlin sounded increasingly frequent after 25 August 1940, they swiftly became known as Meiers Waldhörner ('Meier's hunting horns') in the Berlin vernacular, doubly apt because Göring was also the leader of the German Hunting Society.

The bombing raids on Berlin prompted Hitler to order the shift of the Luftwaffe's target from British airfields and air defenses to British cities. In the following two weeks there were a further five raids of a similar size, all nominally precision raids at specific targets, but with the difficulties of navigating at night the bombs that were dropped were widely dispersed. During 1940 there were more raids on Berlin, all of which did little damage. The raids grew more frequent in 1941, but were ineffective in hitting important targets. The head of the Air Staff of the RAF, Charles Portal, justified these raids by saying that to "get four million people out of bed and into the shelters" was worth the losses involved.

The Soviet Union started a bombing campaign on Berlin on 8 August 1941 that extended into early September. Medium Soviet Navy bombers, accompanied from 12 August by Red Army bombers, conducted ten raids from Saaremaa island to Berlin with 3–12 aircraft in each raid, fifty in total reaching Berlin. Heavy Army bombers, operating from near Leningrad, executed one raid to Berlin on 11 August, with only few machines reaching the target. In total in 1941, Soviet aircraft dropped 36 tonnes (79,000 lb) of bombs on Berlin. Combat and operational losses for the Soviets tallied 17 aircraft destroyed and 70 crewmen killed.

On 7 November 1941, Sir Richard Peirse, head of RAF Bomber Command, launched a large raid on Berlin, sending over 160 bombers to the capital. 21 were shot down or crashed, and again little damage was done due to bad weather. This failure led to the dismissal of Peirse and his replacement (in February 1942) by Arthur Travers Harris, who believed in both the efficacy and necessity of area bombing. Harris said:

The Nazis entered this war under the rather childish delusion that they were going to bomb everyone else, and nobody was going to bomb them. At Rotterdam, London, Warsaw, and half a hundred other places, they put their rather naïve theory into operation. They sowed the wind, and now they are going to reap the whirlwind.

At the same time, new bombers with longer ranges were coming into service, particularly the Avro Lancaster, which became available in large numbers during 1942. During most of 1942, however, Bomber Command's priority was attacking Germany's U-boat ports as part of Britain's effort to win the Battle of the Atlantic. During the whole of 1942 there were only nine air alerts in Berlin, none of them serious. Only in 1943 did Harris have both the means and the opportunity to put his belief in area bombing into practice.

== Battle of Berlin ==
The Battle of Berlin was launched by Harris in November 1943, a concerted air campaign against the German capital, although other cities continued to be attacked to prevent the Germans concentrating their defences in Berlin. Harris believed this could be the blow that would break German resistance. "It will cost us between 400 and 500 aircraft," he said. "It will cost Germany the war." By this time he could deploy over 800 long-range bombers on any given night, equipped with new and more sophisticated navigational devices such as H2S radar. Between November 1943 and March 1944, Bomber Command made 16 massed attacks on Berlin.

A prelude to the 1943 raids came from De Havilland Mosquitos, which hit the capital on 30 January 1943, the tenth anniversary of the Nazis' Machtergreifung. That same day, both Göring and Goebbels were known to be giving big speeches that were to be broadcast live by radio. At precisely 11 am, Mosquitoes of No. 105 Squadron arrived over Berlin exactly on time to disrupt Göring's speech. Later that day, No. 139 Squadron repeated the trick for Goebbels. These were great propaganda raids which – much as the Doolittle Raid on the Japanese home islands had done for shaking Japanese complacency in April 1942 – were a severe embarrassment for the German leadership. 20 April 1943 was Hitler's 54th birthday. Bomber Command decided that they had to mark the occasion with a raid on Berlin, and it was decided that the Mosquito was the right aircraft for the job. Accordingly, No. 105 Squadron was dispatched to the German capital, successfully reaching the city with the loss of only one aircraft.

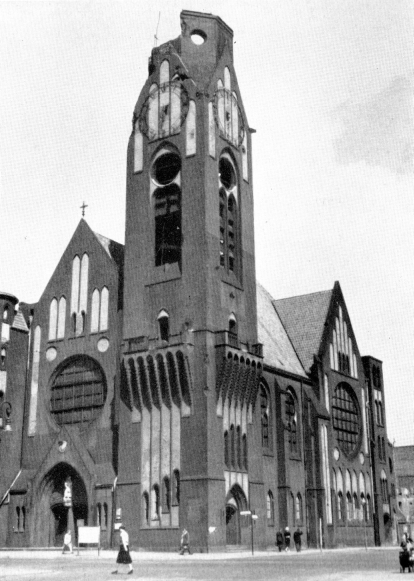
The Reformation Church in Moabit, damaged in the night of 22–23 November 1943

The first raid of the battle occurred on 18–19 November 1943. Berlin was the main target, and was attacked by 440 Avro Lancasters aided by four Mosquitos. The city was under cloud and the damage was not severe. The second major raid was on the night of 22–23 November 1943. This was the most effective raid by the RAF on Berlin. The raid caused extensive damage to the residential areas west of the centre, Tiergarten and Charlottenburg, Schöneberg and Spandau. Because of the dry weather conditions, several firestorms ignited. The Kaiser Wilhelm Memorial Church was destroyed. Several other buildings of note were either damaged or destroyed, including the British, French, Italian and Japanese embassies, Charlottenburg Palace and Berlin Zoo, as were the Ministry of Munitions, the Waffen SS Administrative College, the barracks of the Imperial Guard at Spandau and several arms factories.

On 17 December, extensive damage was done to the Berlin railway system. By this time cumulative effect of the bombing campaign had made more than a quarter of Berlin's total living accommodation unusable. There was another major raid on 28–29 January 1944, when Berlin's western and southern districts were hit in the most concentrated attack of this period. On 15–16 February, important war industries were hit, including the large Siemensstadt area, with the centre and south-western districts sustaining most of the damage. This was the largest raid by the RAF on Berlin. Raids continued until March 1944.

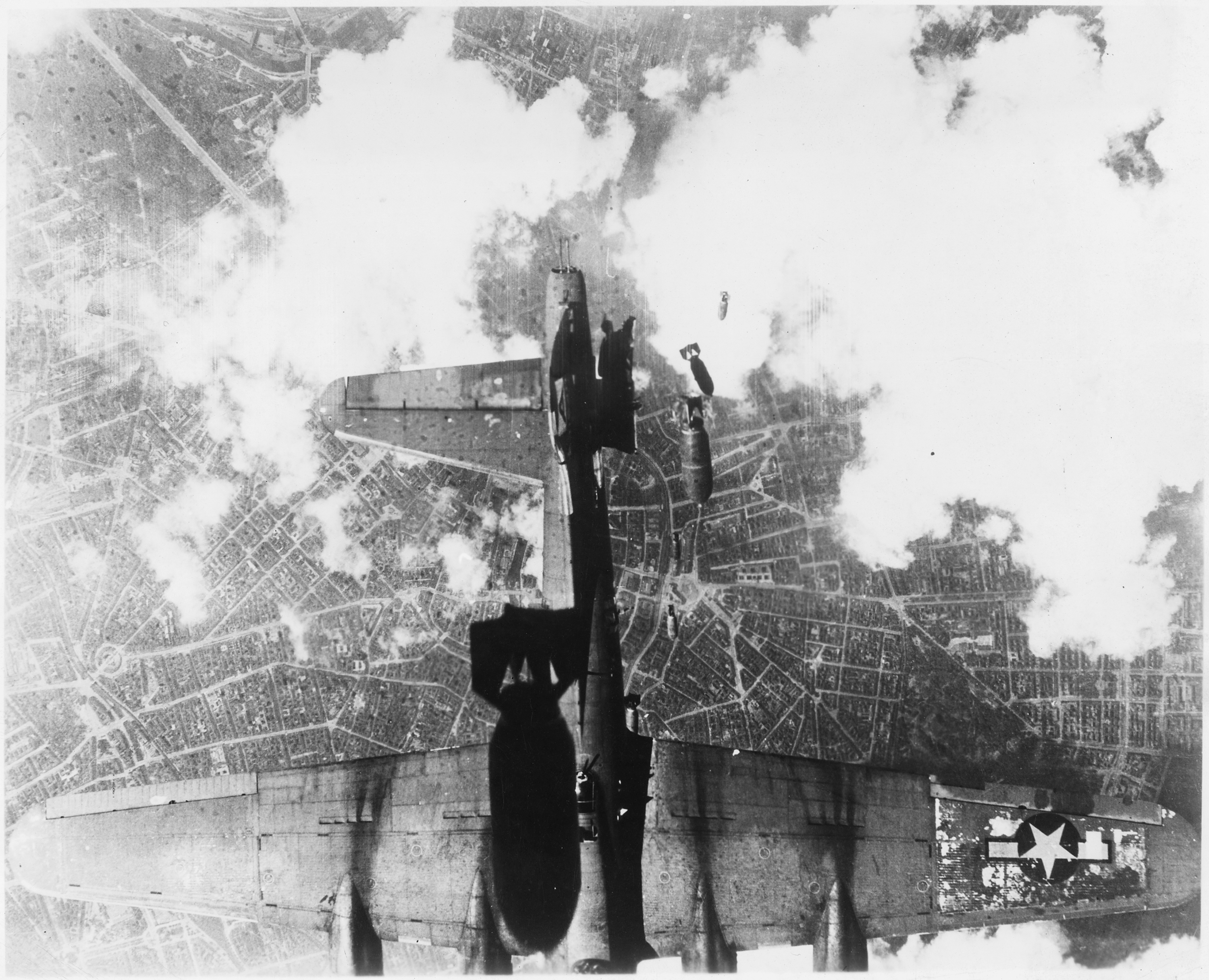
A USAAF B-17 "Miss Donna Mae II" is damaged by a mis-timed bomb release over Museum Island, Berlin in May 1944. All 11 airmen were killed.

These raids caused immense devastation and loss of life in Berlin. The 22 November 1943 raid killed 2,000 Berliners and rendered 175,000 homeless. The following night, 1,000 were killed and 100,000 made homeless. During December and January regular raids killed hundreds of people each night and rendered between 20,000 and 80,000 homeless each time. Overall nearly 4,000 were killed, 10,000 injured and 450,000 made homeless.

The 16 raids on Berlin cost Bomber Command more than 500 aircraft, with their crews killed or captured. This was a loss rate of 5.8%, which was above the 5% threshold that was considered the maximum sustainable operational loss rate by the RAF. In December 1943, for example, 11 crews from No. 460 Squadron RAAF alone were lost in operations against Berlin; and in January and February, another 14 crews were killed. Having 25 aircraft destroyed meant that the fighting force of the squadron had to be replaced in three months. At these rates "Bomber Command would have been wiped out before Berlin." It has been largely acknowledged that the Battle of Berlin was a failure; for the RAF, British official historians have stated that "in an operational sense the Battle of Berlin was more than a failure, it was a defeat".

== March 1944 to April 1945 ==
In 1943, the United States Army and the Standard Oil company built a set of replicas in western Utah of typical German working class housing estates, "German Village", which would be of key importance in acquiring the know-how and experience necessary to carry out the firebombings on Berlin. It was done with the assistance of Erich Mendelsohn, a Jewish architect of structures in Berlin who fled the Nazis in 1933.

The Big Week (Sunday, 20–Friday, 25 February 1944) heavy bomber offensive began shortly after the Eighth Air Force commander, Maj. Gen. Jimmy Doolittle, had implemented a major change in fighter defense of USAAF strategic bomber formations that had bolstered the confidence of U.S. strategic bombing crews. Until that time, Allied bombers avoided contact with the Luftwaffe; now, the Americans used any method that would force the Luftwaffe into combat. Implementing this policy, the United States looked toward Berlin. Raiding the German capital, the USAAF reasoned, would force the Luftwaffe into battle. Consequently, on 3 March, the USSTAF launched the first of several attacks against Berlin. Fierce battles raged and resulted in heavy losses for both sides; 69 Boeing B-17 Flying Fortresses were lost on 6 March but the Luftwaffe lost 160 aircraft. The Allies replaced their losses; the Luftwaffe could not.

At the tail end of the Battle of Berlin the RAF made one last large raid on the city on the night of 24–25 March, losing 8.9% of the attacking force, but due to the failure of the Battle of Berlin, and the switch to the tactical bombing of France during the summer months in support of the Allied invasion of France, RAF Bomber Command left Berlin alone for most of 1944. Nevertheless, regular nuisance raids by both the RAF and USAAF continued. In 1945, the Eighth Air Force launched a number of very large daytime raids on Berlin, the last of them being on 18 March (there were bombing raids to Falkensee and Spandau, near Berlin, on 28 March), the 15th Air Force launched its only bombing mission to Berlin on 24 March, and for 36 nights in succession scores of RAF Mosquitos bombed the German capital, ending on the night of 20/21 April 1945 just before the Soviets entered the city.

=== The largest American raid on Berlin ===
1,500 bombers of the Eighth Air Force, protected by some 1,000 fighters, attacked the Berlin railway system on the morning of 3 February 1945, in the belief that the German Sixth Panzer Army was moving through Berlin by train on its way to the Eastern Front, and would use the Tempelhof railyards for the move. This was one of the few occasions on which the USAAF undertook a mass attack on a city centre. Lt-General James Doolittle, commander of the USAAF Eighth Air Force, objected to this tactic, but he was overruled by the USAAF commander, General Carl Spaatz, who was supported by the Allied commander General Dwight D. Eisenhower. Eisenhower and Spaatz made it clear that the attack on Berlin was of great political importance in that it was designed to assist the Soviet offensive on the Oder east of Berlin, and was essential for Allied unity.

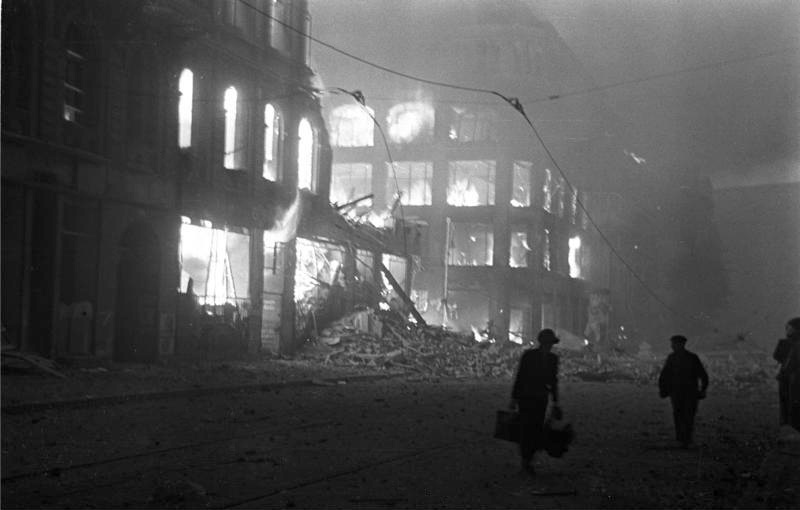
Bombing of Berlin in July 1944

In the raid, led by Lieutenant-Colonel Robert Rosenthal of the 100th Bombardment Group flying in an H2X-equipped pathfinder B-17G Fortress — commanding the entire First Air Division's bomber force on this raid, Friedrichstadt (the newspaper district), and Luisenstadt (both divided between the boroughs of Kreuzberg and Mitte, the central area) and some other areas, such as Friedrichshain, were severely damaged. The bombs used in this raid consisted mostly of high explosive ordnance and not incendiary munitions. The area that suffered the greatest damage did not include railway main lines, which were more northern (Stadtbahn) and southern (Ringbahn).

The bombing was so dense that it caused a city fire spreading eastwards, driven by the wind, over the south of Friedrichstadt and the northwest of neighboured Luisenstadt. The fire lasted for four days until it had burnt everything combustible in its range to ashes and after it had reached waterways, large thoroughfares, and parks that the fire could not jump over. Due to the exhaustion of German supplies, the German anti-aircraft defense was under-equipped and weak, so that out of the 1,600 US aircraft committed, only 36 were shot down and their crews taken as war prisoners. Rosenthal was among those shot down, but survived and was rescued by the Soviet armed forces and eventually returned to England.

A number of monuments, such as French Luisenstadt Church, St. James Church, Jerusalem's Church, Luisenstadt Church, St. Michael's Church, St. Simeon Church, and the Marcher Protestant Consistory (today's entrance of Jewish Museum Berlin), as well as government and Nazi Party buildings were also hit, including the Reich Chancellery, the Party Chancellery, the Gestapo headquarters, and the People's Court. The Unter den Linden, Wilhelmstrasse and Friedrichstrasse areas were turned into expanses of ruins. Roland Freisler, the infamous head justice of the People's Court, was among the dead. The death toll amounted to 2,894, fewer than might have been expected because the raid took place in daytime with relatively few incendiary bombs. The number of wounded amounted to 20,000, and 120,000 were left homeless ("dehoused").

A film shot by the US Air Force in July 1945, showing the destruction in central Berlin

Another raid on 26 February 1945 left another 80,000 people homeless. Raids continued until April, when the Red Army was outside the city. In the last days of the war the Red Air Force also bombed Berlin, also using Ilyushin Il-2 and similar aircraft for low-level attacks from 28 March onwards. By this time, Berlin's civil defences and infrastructure were close to collapse, but civilian morale held. After the capture of Berlin, Soviet General Nikolai Bersarin said, referring to the Red Army's artillery and rocket bombardment, that "the Western Allies had dropped 65,000 tons of explosives on the city in the course of more than two years; whereas the Red Army had expended 40,000 tons in merely two weeks". Later, statisticians calculated that for every inhabitant of Berlin there were nearly 30 cubic metres (1,100 cu ft) of rubble.

Up to the end of March 1945, there had been a total of 314 air raids on Berlin, with 85 of those coming in the last twelve months. Half of all houses were damaged and around a third uninhabitable, as much as 1,600 hectares (4,000 acres) of the city was simply rubble. About a third of Berlin's area was badly damaged by the war. From the city centre, buildings were completely destroyed or gutted for about 20 blocks in all directions. Among the shelled structures some residents and normal activity quickly resumed in the city post-war. Estimates of the total number of dead in Berlin from air raids range from 20,000 to 50,000; current German studies suggest that a figure in the lower part of this range is more likely. This compares to death tolls of between 25,000 and 35,000 in the single attack on Dresden on 14 February 1945, and the 42,000 killed at Hamburg in a single raid in 1943. Both the Hamburg and Dresden raids combined having a lower casualty total than the 9/10 March 1945 Operation Meetinghouse single firebombing raid on Tokyo, devastating some 4,090 hectares (10,100 acres) causing the loss of at least 100,000 lives in the Japanese capital.

Assistant Secretary of War Robert A. Lovett advised softening of claims to have destroyed Hiroshima, saying that after making proclamations to have destroyed Berlin, "it becomes rather embarrassing after about the third time".

== Berlin's defences ==
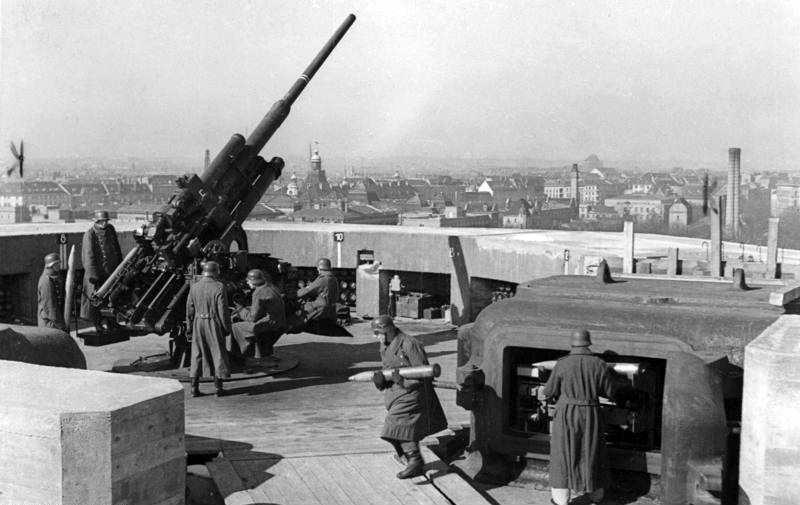
The Zoo flak tower, April 1942

The Nazi regime was well aware of the political necessity of protecting the Reich capital against devastation from the air. Even before the war, work had begun on an extensive system of public air raid shelters, but by 1939 only 15% of the planned 2,000 shelters had been built. By 1941, however, the five huge public shelters (Zoo, Anhalt Station, Humboldthain, Friedrichshain and Kleistpark) were complete, offering shelter to 65,000 people. Other shelters were built under or near government buildings, the best-known being the so-called Führerbunker underground in the backyard of the Reich Chancellery building. In addition, many U-Bahn stations were converted into shelters. The rest of the population had to make do with their own cellars.

In 1943, the Germans decided to evacuate non-essential people from Berlin. By 1944 1.2 million people, 790,000 of them women and children, about a quarter of the city's population, had been evacuated to rural areas. An effort was made to evacuate all children from Berlin, but this was resisted by parents, and many evacuees soon made their way back to the city (as was also the case in London in 1940–41). The increasing shortage of manpower as the war dragged on meant that female labour was essential to keep Berlin's war industries going, so the evacuation of all women with children was not possible. At the end of 1944 the city's population began to grow again as refugees fleeing the Red Army's advance in the east began to pour into Berlin. Refugees from the east (Ostvertriebene) were officially denied permission to remain in Berlin for longer than two days and were housed in camps near the city before being moved on westwards; it is estimated less than 50,000 managed to remain in Berlin. By January 1945 the population was around 2.9 million, although the demands of the German military were such that only 100,000 of these were males aged 18–30. Another 100,000 or so were forced labor, mainly French "foreign workers" (Fremdarbeiter) and Russian "eastern workers" (Ostarbeiter). The key to the Flak area were three huge Flak towers (Flaktürme), which provided enormously tough platforms for both searchlights and 12.8 cm FlaK 40 anti-aircraft guns as well as shelters (Hochbunker) for civilians. These towers were at the Berlin Zoo in the Tiergarten, Humboldthain and Friedrichshain. The Flak guns were increasingly manned by the teenagers of the Hitler Youth as older men were drafted to the front. By 1945 the girls of the League of German Girls (BDM) were also operating Flak guns. After 1944 there was little fighter protection from the Luftwaffe, and the Flak defences were increasingly overwhelmed by the scale of the attacks.

== Timeline ==
Bombing of Berlin during World War II
Date	Bomber command	Notes
7–8 June 1940	French Navy	One Farman N.C.223.4 Jules Verne converted long-range transport. Flew from Bordeaux via Baltic Sea, approaching Berlin from the north (first bombing of Berlin).
25–26 August 1940	RAF	95 aircraft.
7 September 1940	RAF	Bombed Christuskirche church in Neukölln.
10 September 1940	RAF	Damaged Brandenburg Gate.
12/13 March 1941	RAF	U-boat production at Hamburg, Bremen and Berlin attacked with 257 aircraft
24 March 1941	RAF	130 bombers. For the first time Polish Air Forces took part (No. 300 Squadron).
17–18 April 1941	RAF	
7–8 August 1941	Soviet Navy	10 DB-3 bombers of the Baltic Fleet, operating from Kuressaare airfield (Kagul) on Saaremaa island (5 reached Berlin, dropping 3 tons of bombs).
8–9 August 1941	Soviet Navy	9 DB-3 bombers of the Baltic Fleet, operating from Kuressaare airfield on Saaremaa island (9 reached Berlin, dropping 5.4 tons of bombs).
10–11 August 1941	Soviet Air Force	8 TB-7 (Pe-8) heavy bombers and 3 Yer-2 from Pushkin, of these 3 TB-7 and 2 Yer-2 reached Berlin.
11–12 August 1941	Soviet Navy, Soviet Air Force	3 DB-3 bombers of the Baltic Fleet, operating from Kuressaare and 9 DB-3F (Il-4) from Long Range Aviation operating from Aste on Saaremaa island (8 reached Berlin).
13 August 1941	RAF	82 tons of bombs
15-16 August 1941	Soviet Navy, Soviet Air Force	13 DB-3 bombers of the Baltic Fleet and 9 DB-3F (Il-4) from Long Range Aviation, operating from Saaremaa island (17 reached Berlin, dropping 10.5 tons of bombs).
18–19 August 1941	Soviet Air Force	5 DB-3F (Il-4) bombers from Long Range Aviation, operating from Saaremaa island (2 reached Berlin).
20–21 August 1941	Soviet Navy, Soviet Air Force	8 DB-3 bombers of the Baltic Fleet and 4 DB-3F (Il-4) from Long Range Aviation, operating from Saaremaa island (3 reached Berlin, 4 lost).
31 August–1 September 1941	Soviet Navy	6 DB-3 bombers of the Baltic Fleet, operating from Saaremaa island (2-3 reached Berlin).
2–3 September 1941	Soviet Navy	2 DB-3 bombers of the Baltic Fleet, operating from Saaremaa island (1 reached Berlin).
3 September 1941	RAF	
4 September 1941	RAF	
4–5 September 1941	Soviet Navy	6 DB-3 bombers of the Baltic Fleet (3 reached Berlin). In total 57 naval and 27 army DB-3/DB-3F aircraft performed ten raids from 7 August to 5 September, of these 50 reached Berlin, dropping some 30 tons of bombs.
7/8 September 1941	RAF	197 bombers (a mixture of Vickers Wellingtons, Handley Page Hampdens, Armstrong Whitworth Whitleys, Short Stirlings, Handley Page Halifaxes and Avro Manchesters)
8 September 1941	RAF	Burned Potsdamer Bahnhof, over 100 civilians killed in a house at Pariser Platz
7–8 November 1941	RAF	169 aircraft sent to Berlin with other raids at same time. 20 aircraft (12.5%) lost Only around 30% of aircraft reached main target, and cloud cover resulted in blind bombing. The high losses led to pause in Bomber Command main bombing campaign
26 August 1942	Soviet Air Force	Il-4 bombers.
2 March 1943	RAF	251 bombers, 17 lost, dropped 610 tons of bombs, 711 killed on the ground.
23–24 August 1943	RAF	727 Lancasters, Halifaxes, Stirlings and Mosquitos set out, with 70 turning back before reaching target. 57 aircraft (7.8%) lost.
31 August–1 September 1943	RAF	613 heavy bombers (331 Lancasters, 176 Halifaxes, 106 Stirling) and 9 Mosquitos. 47 aircraft (7.6%) lost. The evacuation of "all children and all adults not engaged in war work" was ordered by the Berlin authorities.
3–4 September 1943	RAF	316 Lancasters dispatched with four Mosquitos carrying out diversionary laying of flares to distract defences. 22 aircraft (6.9%) lost.
18–19 November 1943	RAF	The first operation of the RAF Battle of Berlin campaign. Berlin, the main target, was attacked by 440 Avro Lancasters and 4 de Havilland Mosquitos. They bombed the city, which was under cloud with 2% aircraft loss rate. Diversionary raids on Mannheim and Ludwigshafen by 395 other aircraft. Mosquitos attacked several other towns. In all 884 sorties. 32 aircraft (3.6%) lost.
22–23 November 1943	RAF	Berlin the main target. 469 Lancasters, 234 Handley Page Halifaxes, 50 Short Stirlings, 11 Mosquitos. Total 764 aircraft. This was the most effective raid on Berlin of the war. Most of the damage was to the residential areas west of the centre, Tiergarten and Charlottenburg, Schöneberg and Spandau. Because of the dry weather conditions, several 'firestorms' ignited. 175,000 people were left homeless and the ruins of the Kaiser Wilhelm Memorial Church (Kaiser-Wilhelm-Gedächtniskirche) are now a monument in Berlin. Several other buildings of note were either damaged or destroyed, including the British, French, Italian and Japanese embassies, Charlottenburg Palace and Berlin Zoo, as well as the Ministry of Weapons and Munitions, the Waffen SS Administrative College, the barracks of the Imperial Guard at Spandau. Several factories employed in the manufacture of material for the armed forces and 26 aircraft (3.4%) were also lost.
23–24 November 1943	RAF	Berlin, the main target, was attacked by 365 Lancasters, 10 Halifaxes, 8 Mosquitos (383 aircraft).
24–25 November 1943	RAF	Berlin, in a small raid, was attacked by 6 Mosquitos, 1 Mosquito lost
25–26 November 1943	RAF	3 Mosquitos to Berlin.
26–27 November 1943	RAF	Berlin, the main target, was attacked by 443 Lancasters and 7 Mosquitos. Most of the damage in Berlin was in the semi-industrial suburb of Reinickendorf. Stuttgart was a diversion, attacked by 84 aircraft. The total sorties for the night was 666. 34 aircraft (5.1%) lost.
2–3 December 1943	RAF	Berlin, the main target, was attacked by 425 Lancasters, 18 Mosquitos, 15 Halifaxes. The Germans correctly identified that Berlin was the target. Unexpected cross winds had scattered the bomber formations and so German fighters found the bombers easier targets, shooting down 37 Lancasters, 2 Halifaxes, 1 Mosquito (8.7% of the force). Due to the cross winds the bombing was inaccurate and to the south of the city, but two more of the Siemens factories, a ball-bearing factory and several railway installations were damaged.
16–17 December 1943	RAF	Berlin was the main target. It was attacked by 483 Lancasters and 15 Mosquitos. German night fighters were successfully directed to intercept the bombers. The damage to the Berlin railway system was extensive. 1,000 wagon-loads of war material destined for the Eastern Front were held up for 6 days. The National Theatre and the building housing Germany's military and political archives were both destroyed. The cumulative effect of the bombing campaign had now made more than a quarter of Berlin's total living accommodation unusable. Two Bristol Beaufighters and 2 Mosquitos of No. 100 Group equipped with Serrate radar detector patrolled the route for German nightfighters. A Bf 110 was damaged, the first time these hunter killers had been on a successful Serrate patrol. 25 Lancasters, 5.2% of the Lancaster force, were lost over enemy occupied territory, with a further 29 aircraft lost on landing in England due to very low cloud.
23–24 December 1943	RAF	Berlin was attacked by 364 Lancasters, 8 Mosquitos and 7 Halifaxes. German fighters encountered difficulty with the weather and were able to shoot down only 16 Lancasters, 4.2% of the force. Damage to Berlin was relatively small.
29–30 December 1943	RAF	Berlin was the main target. 457 Lancasters, 252 Halifaxes and 3 Mosquitos (712 aircraft), RAF losses were light, at 2.8% of the force. Heavy cloud cover frustrated the RAF and damage was light.
1–2 January 1944	RAF	Berlin was the main target. 421 Lancasters dispatched to Berlin. German night fighters were effective and 6.7% of the bombers were shot down. A small raid on Hamburg by 15 Mosquitos and smaller raids on other towns did not divert the night fighters.
2–3 January 1944	RAF	Berlin was the main target. 362 Lancasters, 12 Mosquitos, 9 Halifaxes (383 aircraft). The night fighters did not catch up to the bombers until they were over Berlin and managed to shoot down 27 Lancasters, 10% of the force.
5–6 January 1944	RAF	A diversionary raid by 13 Mosquitos on Berlin.
10–11 January 1944	RAF	Small raids on Berlin, Solingen, Koblenz and Krefeld by 20 Mosquitos. No aircraft were lost.
14–15 January 1944	RAF	17 Mosquitos launched small raids on Magdeburg and Berlin.
20–21 January 1944	RAF	Berlin was the main target. 495 Lancasters, 264 Halifaxes, 10 Mosquitos (769 aircraft) despatched to Berlin. Night fighter attacks were pressed home successfully; 22 Halifaxes and 13 Lancasters were lost, 4.6% of the force. The damage could not be assessed due to low cloud cover the next day.
27–28 January 1944	RAF	Berlin was the main target. 515 Lancasters and 15 Mosquitos (530 aircraft) despatched to Berlin. The RAF records state that the bombing appeared to have been spread well up- and down-wind. The diversionary raids were only partially successful in diverting German night fighters. 33 Lancasters were lost, which was 6.4 per cent of the heavy force. A further 167 sorties were flown against other targets, with one aircraft lost.
28–29 January 1944	RAF	Berlin was the main target. 432 Lancasters, 241 Halifaxes, 4 Mosquitos (677 aircraft) despatched to Berlin. Western and Southern districts, covered by partial cloud, were hit in what the RAF records state was the most concentrated attack of this period. German records do not fully support this mentioning that were 77 places outside the city were hit. Deception raids and routing over Northern Denmark did not prevent the German air defences from reacting. 46 aircraft, 6.8 per cent of the force. Just over 100 other aircraft attacked a number of other targets.
30–31 January 1944	RAF	Berlin was the main target. 440 Lancasters, 82 Halifaxes, 12 Mosquitos (534 aircraft), despatched to Berlin. RAF losses were 33 aircraft, 6.2% of the total.
15–16 February 1944	RAF	Berlin main target. 561 Lancasters, 314 Halifaxes, 16 Mosquitos (891 aircraft), despatched to Berlin. Despite cloud cover most important war industries were hit, including the large Siemensstadt area, with the centre and southwestern districts sustaining most of the damage. This was the largest raid by the RAF on Berlin. A diversionary raid by 24 Lancasters of No. 8 Group on Frankfurt-on-the-Oder failed to confuse the Germans. RAF lost 43 aircraft – 26 Lancasters, 17 Halifaxes, which was 4.8 per cent of the force. A further 155 sorties were flown against other targets.
4 March 1944	USAAF	Target: Berlin. Attempted raids had been halted by bad weather on 3 March. 29-30 B-17s reached the target, 5 shot down.
6 March 1944	USAAF	A maximum effort raid by 730 (504 B-17s and 226 B-24s) bombers and 800 fighters. 69 US bombers were lost. 11 North American P-51 Mustangs were also lost. The Bomber loss rate stood at 10.2 percent. The Luftwaffe lost 64 fighters, including 16 Bf 110 and Me 410 heavy fighters.
8 March 1944	USAAF	Raid against Berlin by 623 bombers. 37 US bombers were lost and 18 fighters were also lost. The Luftwaffe lost 42 fighters, with 3 killed, 26 missing and 9 wounded (includes the Me 410 and Bf 110 multiple manned aircraft)
24–25 March 1944	RAF	Berlin main target. The bomber stream was scattered and those that reached Berlin bombed well out to the south-west of the city. The RAF lost 72 aircraft, 8.9% of the attacking force.
3 February 1945	USAAF	One of the heaviest attacks on Berlin for the entire war. Around 1,000 B-17s struck the city center.
26 February 1945	USAAF	Over 1,000 USAAF bombers attacked Berlin.
18 March 1945	USAAF	1,329 bombers and 733 fighters are dispatched to hit railway stations and tanks plants in the Berlin area.

== Bibliography ==
- Addison, Paul; Crang, Jeremy A. (2006). Firestorm. Pimlico. ISBN 1-84413-928-X.
- Beevor, Antony (2002). Berlin: The Downfall 1945. Penguin Books. ISBN 0-670-88695-5.
- Caldwell, Donald; Muller, Richard (2007). The Luftwaffe over Germany: Defense of the Reich. London: Greenhill Books. ISBN 978-1-85367-712-0. OCLC 76852917.
- Craven, Wesley; Cate, James, eds. (1951). The Army Air Forces in World War II. Vol. III Europe:Argument to VE-Day. University of Chicago Press.
- Davis, Richard B. (2006). Bombing the European Axis Powers. A Historical Digest of the Combined Bomber Offensive 1939–1945: Part V 1945 (PDF). Alabama: Air University Press. Archived from the original (PDF) on 23 July 2011.
- Grayling, A.C. (2006). Among the Dead Cities. London: Bloomsbury. ISBN 978-0-7475-7671-6.
- Green, William (1967). War Planes of the Second World War: Bombers and Reconnaissance Aircraft. Vol. 8. London: Macdonald. ISBN 0356014789.
- Hastings, Max (1981) [1979]. Bomber Command. London: Michael Joseph. ISBN 0-330-26236-X.
- Moss, Norman (2004). Nineteen Weeks: America, Britain and the Fateful Summer of 1940. Houghton Mifflin Harcourt. ISBN 978-0-618-49220-6.
- McInnis, Edgar (1946). The War: Sixth Year. Vol. 6. Toronto: Oxford University Press.
- Quester, George H. (1986). Deterrence before Hiroshima: the Airpower Background of Modern Strategy. Transaction Publishers. ISBN 978-0-88738-087-7.
- Richards, Denis (1994). The Hardest Victory: RAF Bomber Command in the Second World War. London: Coronet. ISBN 0-340-61720-9. OCLC 60281796.
- Rürup, Reinhard (2003) [1995]. Berlin 1945: A Documentation (3rd. revised ed.). Berlin: Verlag Willmuth Arenhövel. ISBN 3-922912-33-8.
- "Royal Air Force World War II Battle Honours". RAF. 12 January 2004. Archived from the original on 31 October 2006.
- Taylor, Frederick (2005). Dresden: Tuesday 13 February 1945 (Paperback ed.). London: Bloomsbury. ISBN 0-7475-7084-1.
- Webster, Charles Kingsley; Frankland, Noble (1961). The Strategic Air Offensive Against Germany: 1939–1945. History of the Second World War Military Series. Vol. II: Endeavour. H. M. Stationery Office.
- Yonnet, Henri (1957). Le 'Jules Verne', avion corsaire (in French). Paris: France-Empire. OCLC 465888537.
