= Zoo Tower =

Fortified air defense tower in Berlin

Coordinates: 52.5100°N 13.3358°E

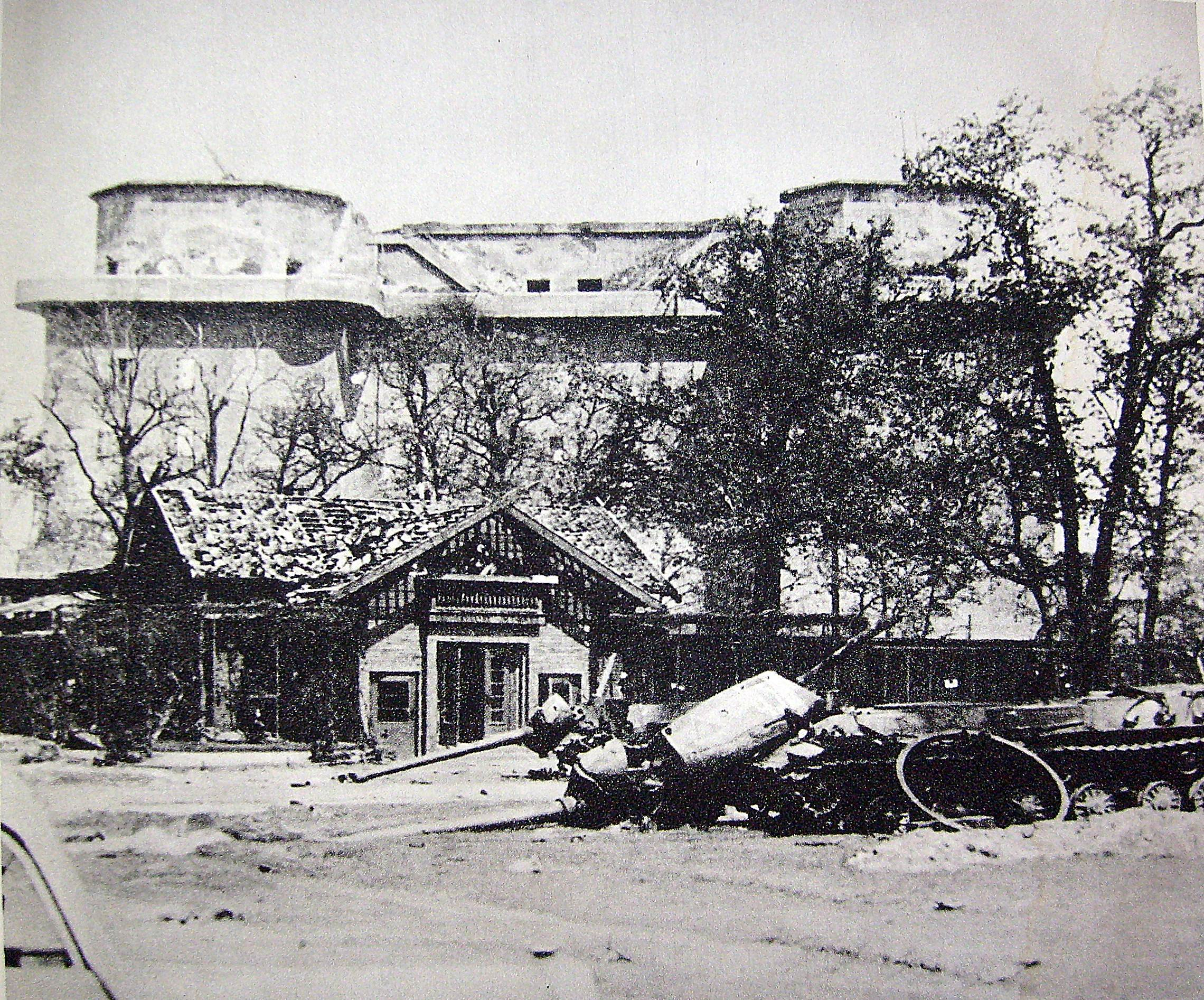
Destroyed IS-2 tanks after the Battle of Berlin, May 1945

The Zoo flak tower (German: Flakturm Tiergarten, Tiergarten Flak Tower or commonly referred to as the "Zoo Tower") was a fortified flak tower that existed in Berlin from 1941 to 1947. It was one of several flak towers that protected Berlin from Allied bomber raids. Its primary role was as a gun platform to protect the government building district of Berlin; in addition, the Hochbunker (blockhouse) was designed to be used as a civilian air-raid shelter. It also contained a hospital and a radio transmitter for use by the German leadership and provided secure storage facilities for art treasures.

During the Battle of Berlin, it acted as a citadel and by depressing its large anti-aircraft artillery, its garrison was able to provide support for ground operations against the Soviet Red Army.

== Development ==
The Berlin flak towers (Flaktürme, singular Flakturm) were originally built as a response to an attack on Berlin by a relatively small force of British bombers. Hitler ordered the construction of these towers after the first bomber attack on Berlin by the RAF on 25 August 1940. Although only 95 RAF bombers constituted the attack force, this was a grave domestic political embarrassment to Adolf Hitler, and in particular Hermann Göring, who had said that Berlin would never be bombed. The Zoo tower was built close to the Berlin Zoo, hence the name, and is the most famous of the flak towers. It was the first one built and protected the government quarter in Berlin.

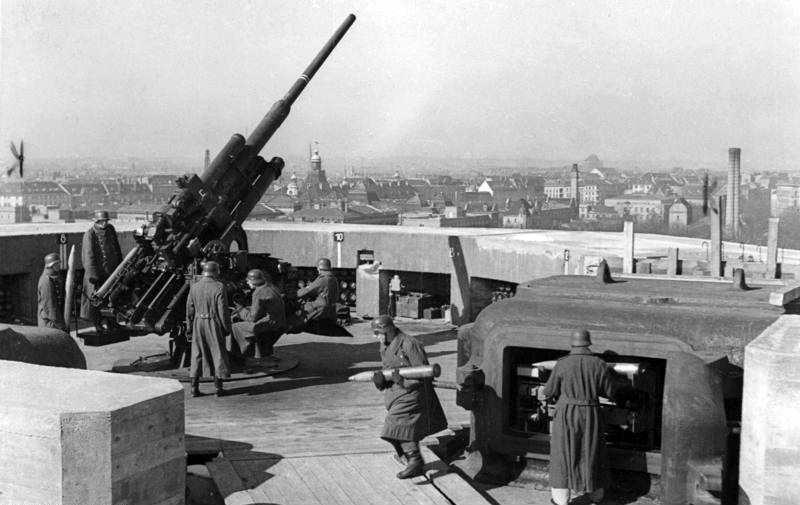
10.5 cm flak on the Zoo tower

== Layout ==
The Zoo tower was a first generation flak tower. Like all the flak towers, it had a main facility that housed the anti aircraft guns, the G building, and a smaller building, the L building, that had sensory equipment, including radar. The two were connected by a tunnel that carried a telephone line to transmit information needed to fight enemy aircraft; and also pipes and cables for water, heating, and electrical power.

There was only one cellar floor and six upper floors above that, despite the tower being 39 m (128 ft) tall—about the height of a 13-storey building. The second floor was used to house the most priceless and irreplaceable holdings of 14 museums from Berlin. The rooms were climate controlled. The third floor held an 85-bed hospital.

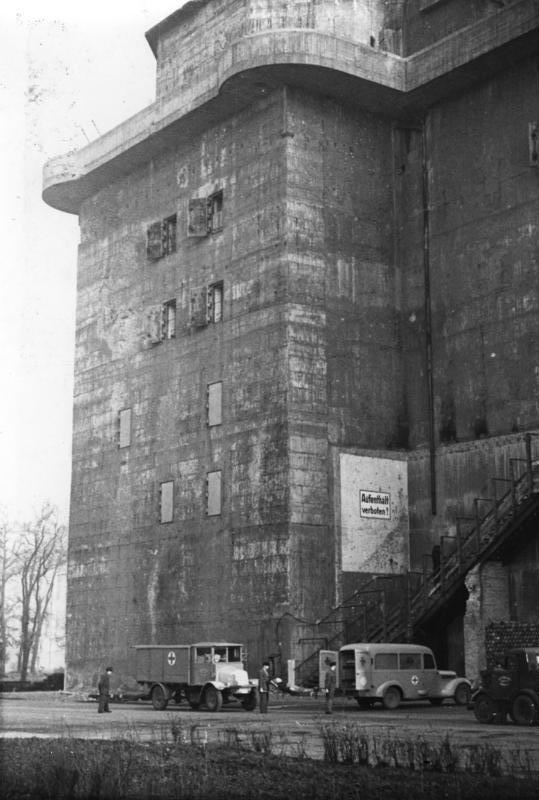
The Zoo tower in 1946

== Specifications ==
As with all flak towers, the installation consisted of two towers, the main G tower, which held the anti-aircraft armaments, and the L tower which held radar and detection equipment. The G Tower could accommodate 15,000 people.

The G tower was crewed by 350 anti-aircraft personnel and assisted by the Hitler Youth.

It was a ferro-concrete structure. The larger tower was large, roughly 70 metres wide by 70 metres deep. The walls were 2.4 meters thick, and the roof was 1.5 meters thick. It was the largest air raid shelter in Berlin.

In terms of provisions, and the defenses of the Zoo Tower, the defenders certainly believed it to be sufficient - "The complex was so well stocked with supplies and ammunition that the military garrison believed that, no matter what happened to the rest of Berlin, the zoo tower could hold out for a year if need be."

== Armaments ==
From 1943, the roof of the facility had four twin mounts of 12.8 cm FlaK 40. As bombers took to higher altitudes, these were the only guns that could hit them. Each barrel could fire 10 to 12 rounds a minute; thus, each twin mounted battery was rated to fire a maximum of 24 rounds a minute, and four twin mounts could fire as many as 96 rounds a minute. The guns were loaded electrically, with the ammunition fed into hoppers. Younger Hitler Youth, while officially not supposed to be combatants, assisted the military during the loading process. Before the 12.8 cm FlaK became available in sufficient numbers, the tower was armed with 10.5 cm FlaK 38.

There was also an array of smaller (20mm and 37mm) anti-aircraft guns on the lower platforms.

== Usage during the war ==
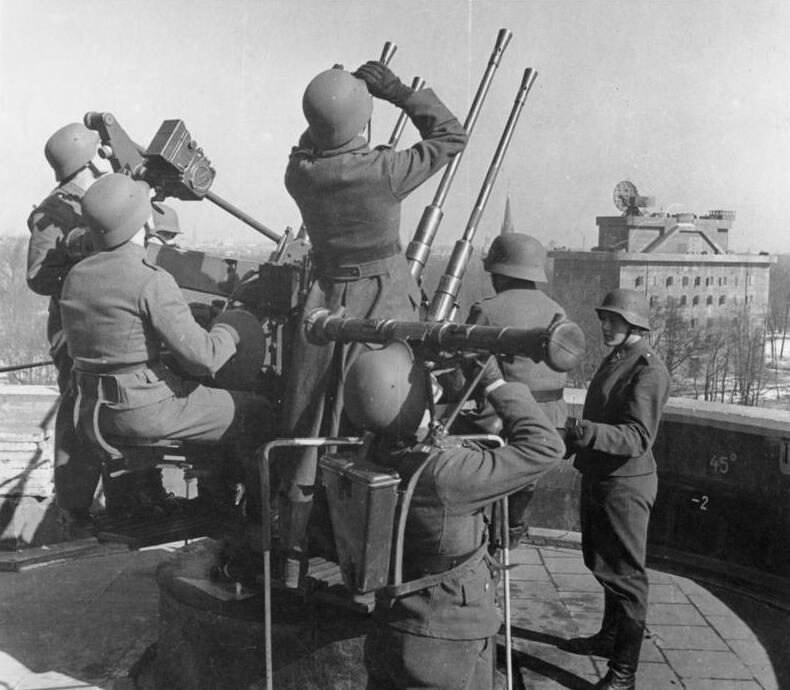
German soldiers on quad-mounted 2-cm-Flak, 16 April 1942

The primary purpose of the Flak Towers was to protect Berlin. Together with the Luftwaffe and a well organised fire brigade, the Berlin flak towers prevented the levels of the aerial attack damage that the RAF and the USAAF expected to occur and had occurred in other German cities. The RAF Bomber Command had been endeavouring to ignite firestorms in Berlin but had been unable to do so.

The hospital facility, within the G tower, was used to treat wounded soldiers, shipped back from the front line. Luftwaffe ace Hans-Ulrich Rudel had his leg amputated there in February 1945.

As the bombing continued, the facility was also used to store art treasures to keep them safe. The Zoo tower in particular stored the Kaiser Wilhelm coin collection, the Nefertiti Bust, the disassembled Pergamon Altar from Pergamon, and other major treasures of the Berlin museums.

There had been the option to use the Tower as a command facility for the defence of Berlin, by General Hellmuth Reymann, the Reich Commissioner in charge of the city's defence effort. Reymann had refused to move his headquarters there. Goebbels' headquarters was inside the tower, though he himself stayed in the Führerbunker in his final days.

== Battle for Berlin ==
With Soviet and Polish troops entering Berlin in 1945, civilians moved into the Zoo tower to escape harm.

Soviet troops (150th and 171st Rifle Divisions) attacked across the Moltke Bridge covering the River Spree. This was defended by German infantry and rockets, who were under pressure from Soviet tanks crossing the bridge, until the heavier anti-aircraft guns from the Zoo tower could gain line of sight through the smoke. They destroyed the tanks and left the bridge covered in destroyed vehicles, which blocked further vehicles from crossing the bridge. The heavier 12.8 cm FlaK 40 anti aircraft guns obliterated Soviet armour, particularly when hitting it from the side.

With thousands of civilians crammed into the facility, conditions in the Zoo tower towards the end were close to unbearable; it was crowded and had little water, and the air was hard to breathe. As the Soviet armies advanced inexorably towards the centre of Berlin, around 10,000 German troops retreated to the Government district. The tower was never successfully assaulted; therefore, it was still able to provide anti-tank support to the defenders in the Government district. For example, during daylight hours on 30 April the Soviets were unable to advance across the open areas in front of the Reichstag to attack the building because of heavy anti-tank fire from the 12.8 cm guns two kilometres away on the Zoo tower.

Soviet troops, not wishing to attack the facility, arranged the surrender of the troops inside. Colonel Haller, negotiating on behalf of the tower, promised to capitulate at midnight. This was a ruse to allow for the forces in the Tiergarten area to make a breakout through the Soviet lines and away from Berlin. This they did, shortly before midnight. The civilians then left the facility.

== Resistance to damage ==
The two towers resisted all attempts to destroy them by air attack and ground forces. They withstood the heaviest Soviet gun, the 203 mm howitzer. Only after the war, with full access and planned demolitions, was the Zoo Tower completely destroyed.

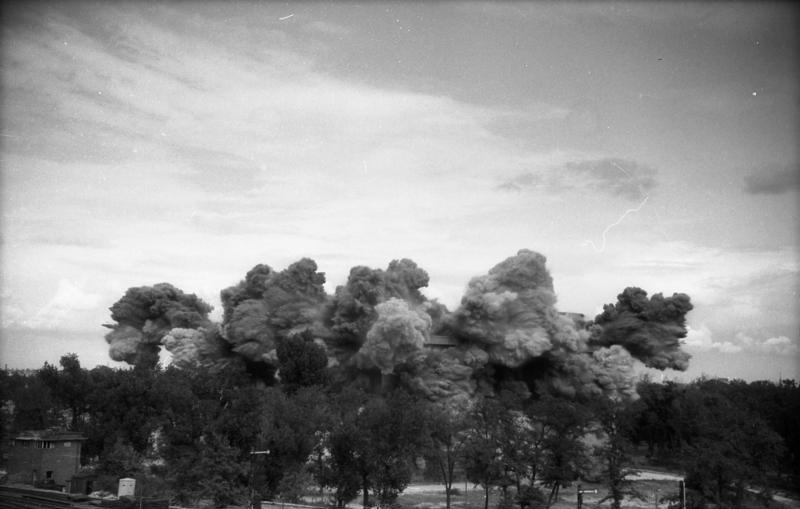
Attempted demolition of the Zoo tower in 4 Sept 1947

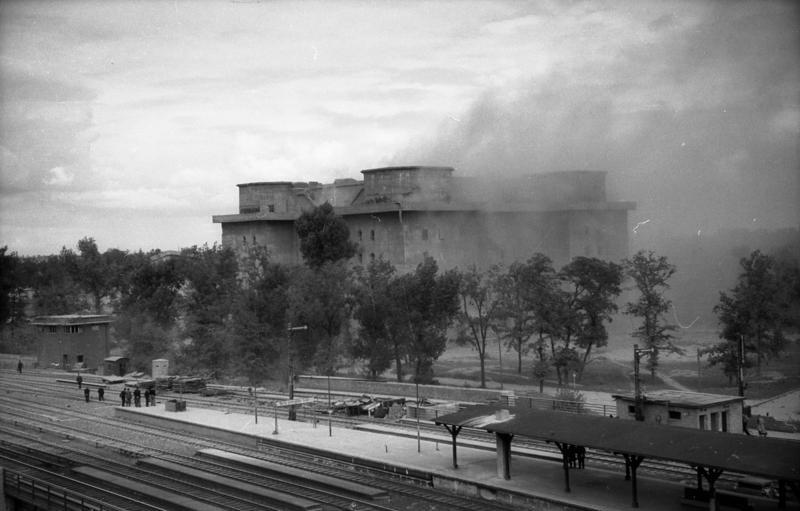
The Zoo tower 4 Sept 1947

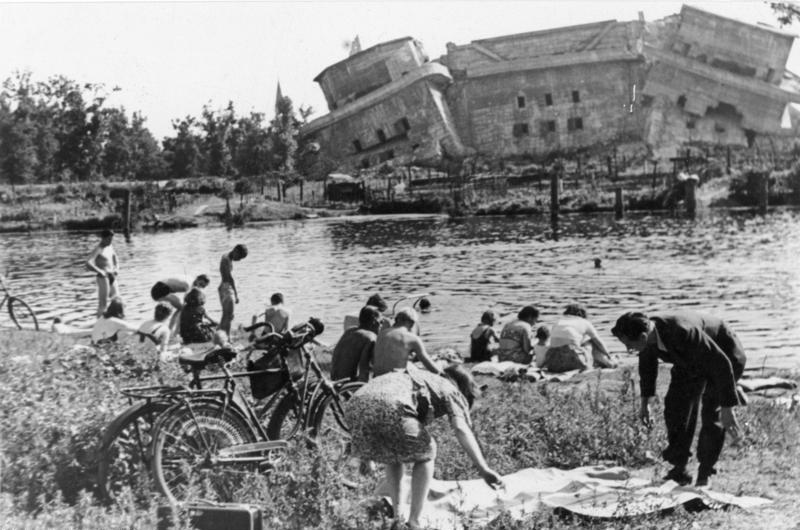
Post-war ruins of the Zoo Tower

== After the war and demolition ==
After the war the building was evacuated, and Soviet troops systematically emptied it of its treasures and sent them to Moscow.

The tower was eventually demolished in 1947 by the British Army. The smaller L tower was blown up successfully on the first attempt on 28 July 1947. The first two attempts to demolish the larger G tower failed. Initially, the G tower was packed with 25 tons of explosives, and press had gathered to watch the demolition. The explosives were set off at 16:00 hours on 30 August; however, when the dust cleared, the G tower still stood. One US journalist is reported to have remarked "Made in Germany". The successful third attempt took four months of preparation and over four hundred holes drilled into the concrete which were filled with 35 tons of dynamite. It was the only tower that was successfully completely blown up, though attempts were made on the others.

After the demolition, Berlin Zoo took over the land. As of 2012 the hippopotamus park occupies the G tower's spot while the L tower's location holds the bird preserve island.

== See also ==
- Anti-aircraft warfare
- Battle of Berlin (air)
- Kammhuber Line
- List of World War II weapons of Germany
- Nazi architecture
- Martello tower
