= Reformation Church =

- Reformationskirche
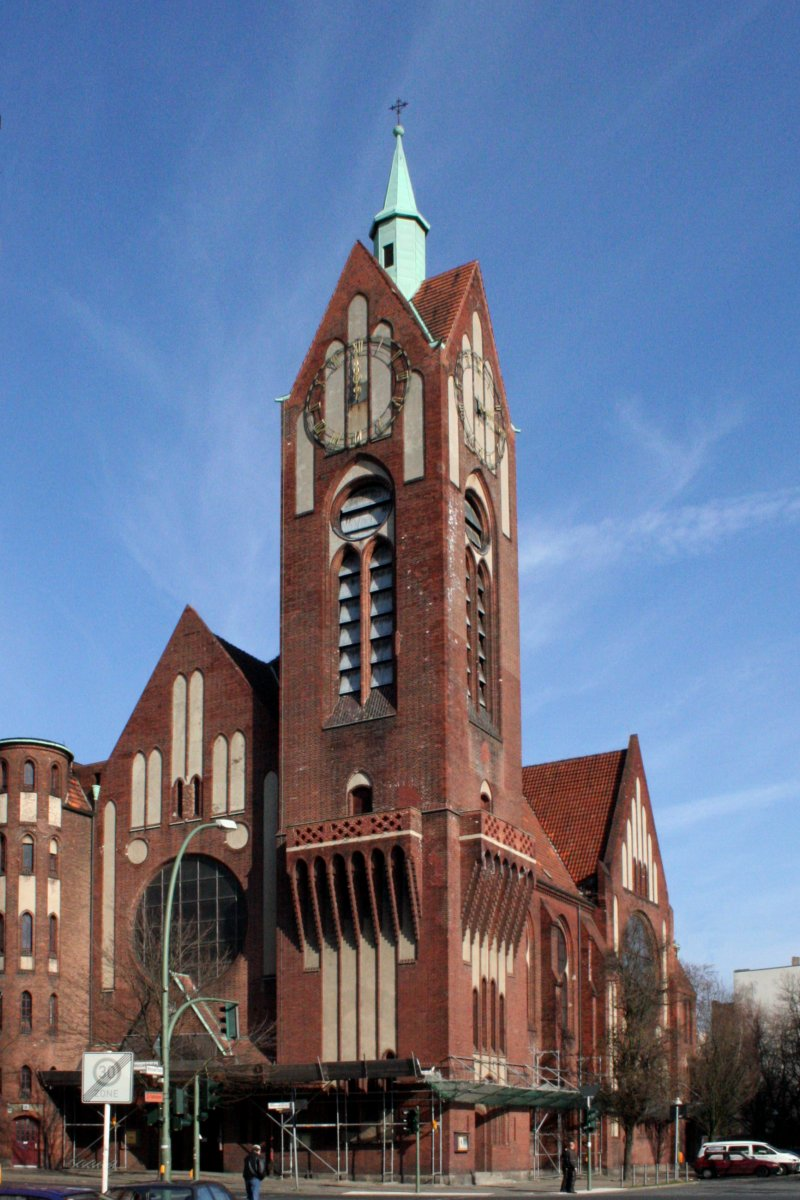

- Location within Berlin Location within Germany
- 52°31′52″N 13°19′44″E
- Location: Moabit, Mitte, Berlin
- Country: Germany
- Denomination: Lutheran
- Website: refo-moabit.de

Architecture
- Architect: Georg Schwartzkopff
- Architectural type: Gothic Revival architecture
- Years built: 1905-1907
- Groundbreaking: 1905-09-28
- Completed: 1907-05-16

Administration
- Diocese: Evangelical Church in Berlin, Brandenburg and Silesian Upper Lusatia
- Parish: Church Circuit Berlin City Center

The Reformation Church is a Lutheran church that was constructed in Moabit, a neighborhood of Berlin, Germany, between 1905 and 1907. The church's steeple, originally topped by a steep spire, was damaged during the Bombing of Berlin in World War II and replaced by a simple and much shorter spire. It is a listed building and a prominent landmark in western Moabit, the so-called Beusselkiez. Since 2011, it has been used by the Konvent an der Reformationskirche.
