= 12.8 cm FlaK 40 =

12.8 cm Flak 40
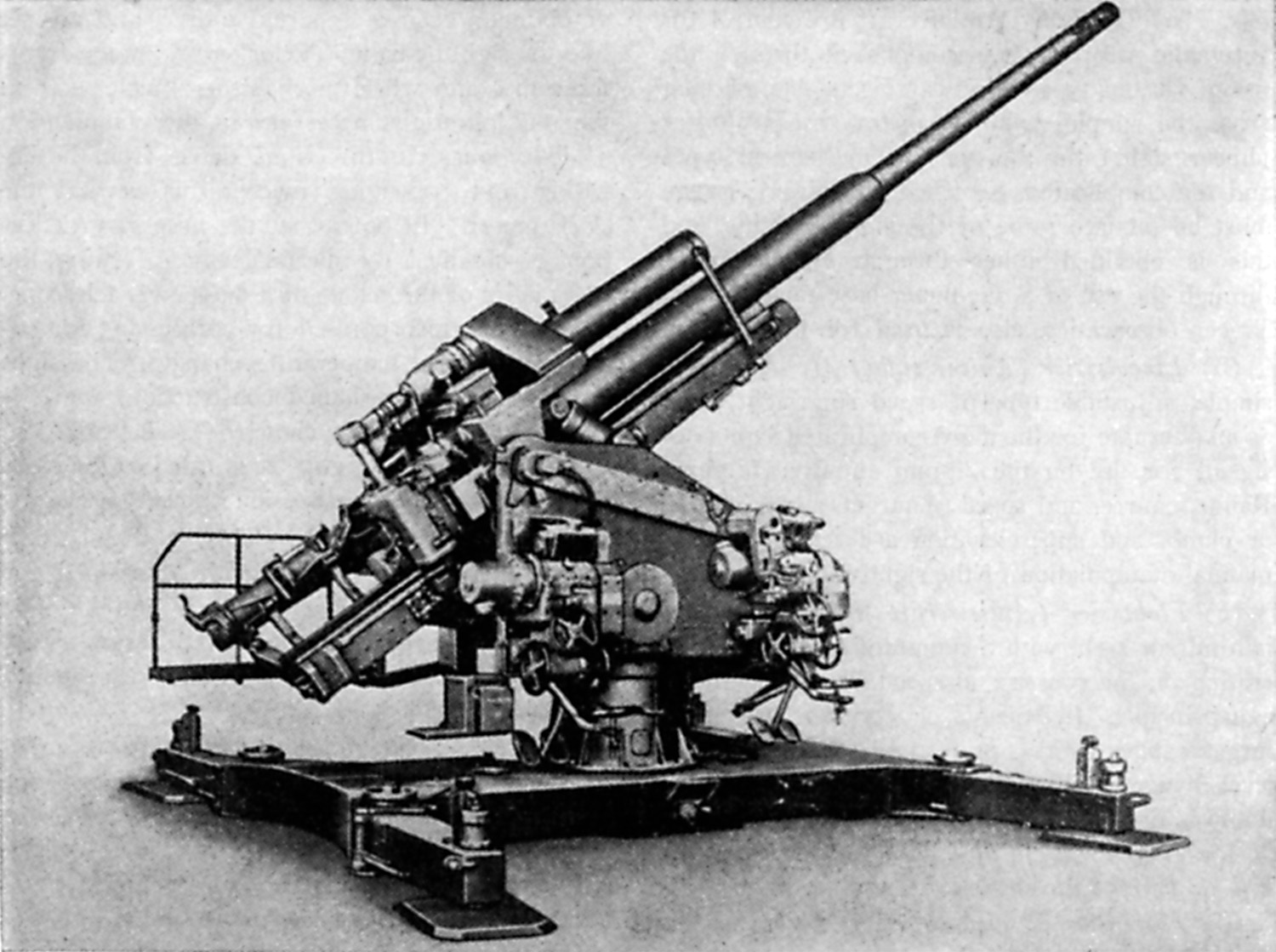
- A static mounted 12.8 cm Flak 40
- Type: Anti-aircraft gun
- Place of origin: Nazi Germany

Service history
- In service: 1942–45
- Used by: Nazi Germany
- Wars: World War II

Production history
- Designer: Rheinmetall-Borsig
- Designed: 1936
- Manufacturer: Rheinmetall-Borsig
- Unit cost: 12,000 man-hours
- Produced: 1942
- No. built: 1,125
- Variants: 12.8 cm Flak 40; 12.8 cm Flak 40 Zwilling

Specifications
- Mass: 17,000 kg (37,000 lb)
- Length: 7.835 m (25 ft 8 in)
- Barrel length: 7.8 m (25 ft 7 in) 61 calibers
- Shell: 128 x 958mm R
- Shell weight: 26 kg (57 lb 5 oz)
- Caliber: 128 mm (5.03 in)
- Breech: Horizontal sliding-block
- Recoil: Hydro-pneumatic
- Carriage: Static or railcar mounted.
- Elevation: -3 to +88 degrees
- Traverse: 360 degrees
- Rate of fire: 10 to 12 rounds per minute
- Muzzle velocity: 880 m/s (2,900 ft/s)
- Maximum firing range: 14,800 m (48,600 ft)
- Feed system: Power rammer

The 12.8 cm Flak 40 was a German anti-aircraft gun used in World War II. Although it was not produced in great numbers, it was reportedly one of the most effective heavy AA guns of its era.

== History ==
Development of the 12.8 cm Flak 40 began in 1936, with the contract being awarded to Rheinmetall Borsig. The first prototype gun was delivered for testing in late 1937 and completed testing successfully. The gun weighed nearly 12 tonnes in its firing position, with the result that its barrel had to be removed for transport. Limited service testing showed this was impractical, so in 1938 other solutions were considered. Ultimately the firing platform was simplified, based on the assumption it would always be securely bolted into concrete. Approximately 200 guns were also mounted on railcars, providing limited mobility.

The total weight of the Flakzwilling twin-gun mount system reached 26.5 tonnes, making it practically impossible to tow cross-country. In the end, this mattered little since by the time the gun entered production in 1942, it was used in primarily static, defensive applications.

There were four twin mounts on the fortified anti-aircraft Zoo Tower, and they were also on other flak towers protecting Berlin, Hamburg, and Vienna. It is claimed that during the Battle of Berlin the guns on the Zoo Tower were used successfully to support ground forces. The rush to capture the Reichstag led to dozens of tanks being destroyed.

The gun fired a 27.9 kg (62 lb) shell at 880 m/s (2,900 ft/s) to a maximum ceiling of 14,800 m (48,600 ft). Compared with the 88 mm Flak 18 & 36, the Flak 40 used a powder charge four times as great.

The Bundeswehr Museum of German Defense Technology in Koblenz has one of these cannons in its collection.

== Variants ==
- 12.8 cm Flakzwilling 40/2 The 12.8 cm Flak 40 ordnance on a static dual mounting with a total weight of 26 tonnes, capable of firing 20 rounds per minute. Used mainly on flak towers. Production started in 1942 with 10 tandems produced, another eight in 1943, and in February 1945 a total of 34 were available.
- 12.8 cm PaK 40 A derivative anti-tank gun, though rejected in favour of the Krupp 12.8 cm Pak 44 for mass production, but two pieces used to arm the Sturer Emil prototypes.

== Gallery ==
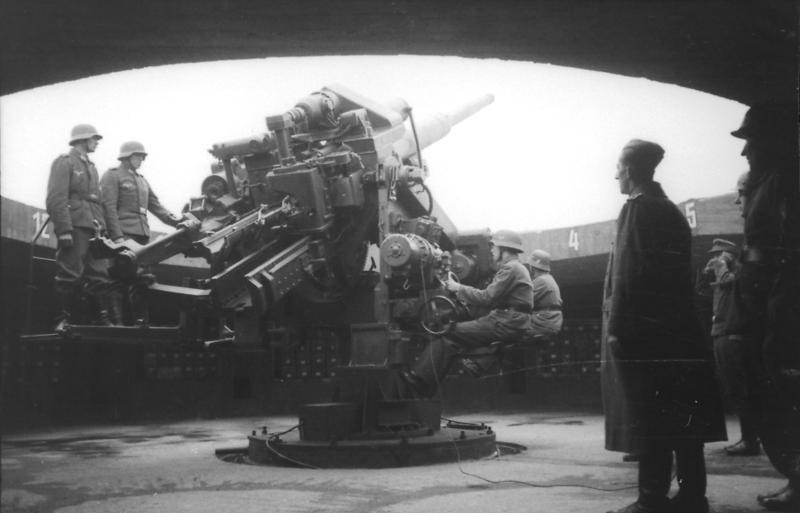
12.8-cm-Flak on a flak tower

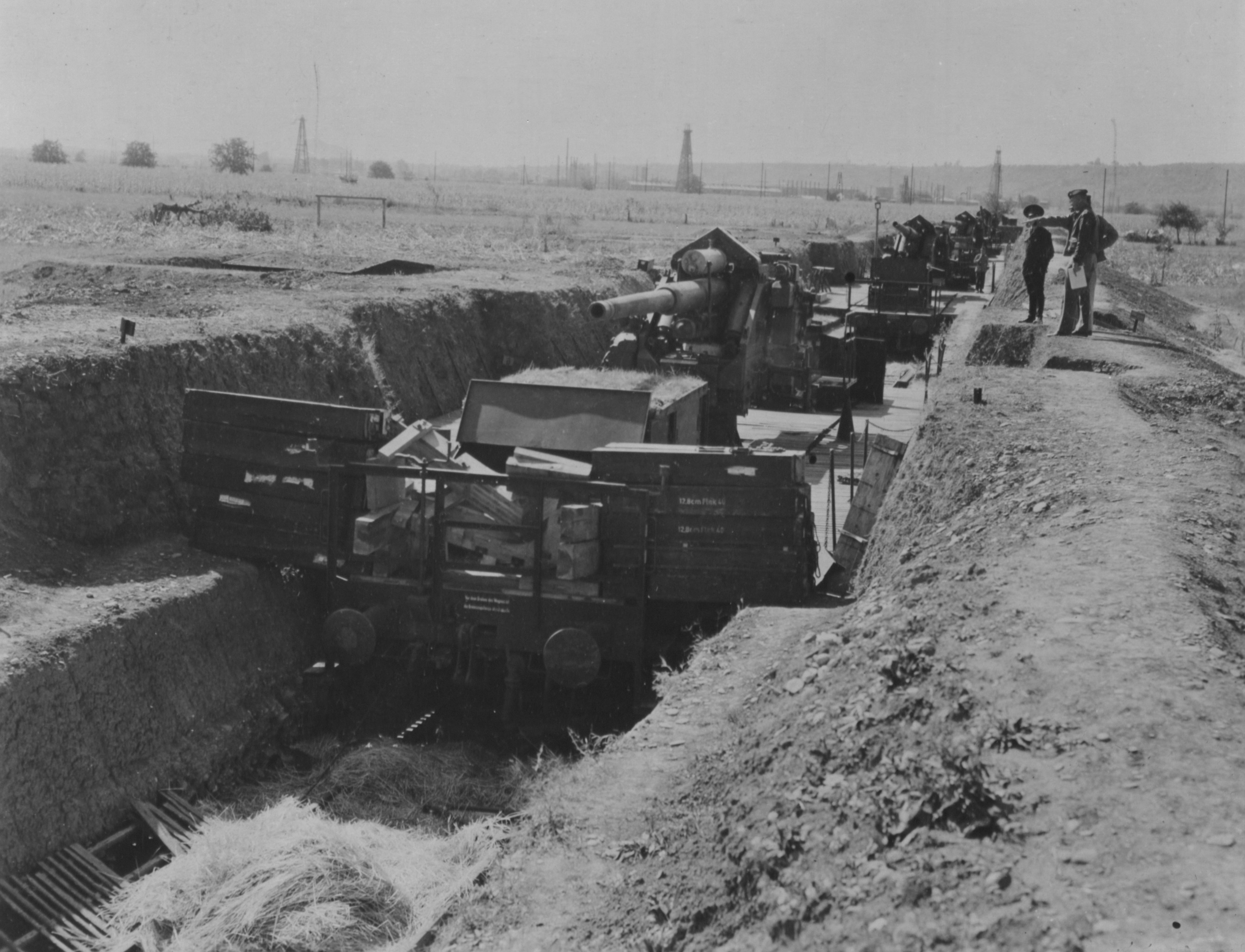
Railcar-mounted Flak 40 at Ploiești, Romania in 1944

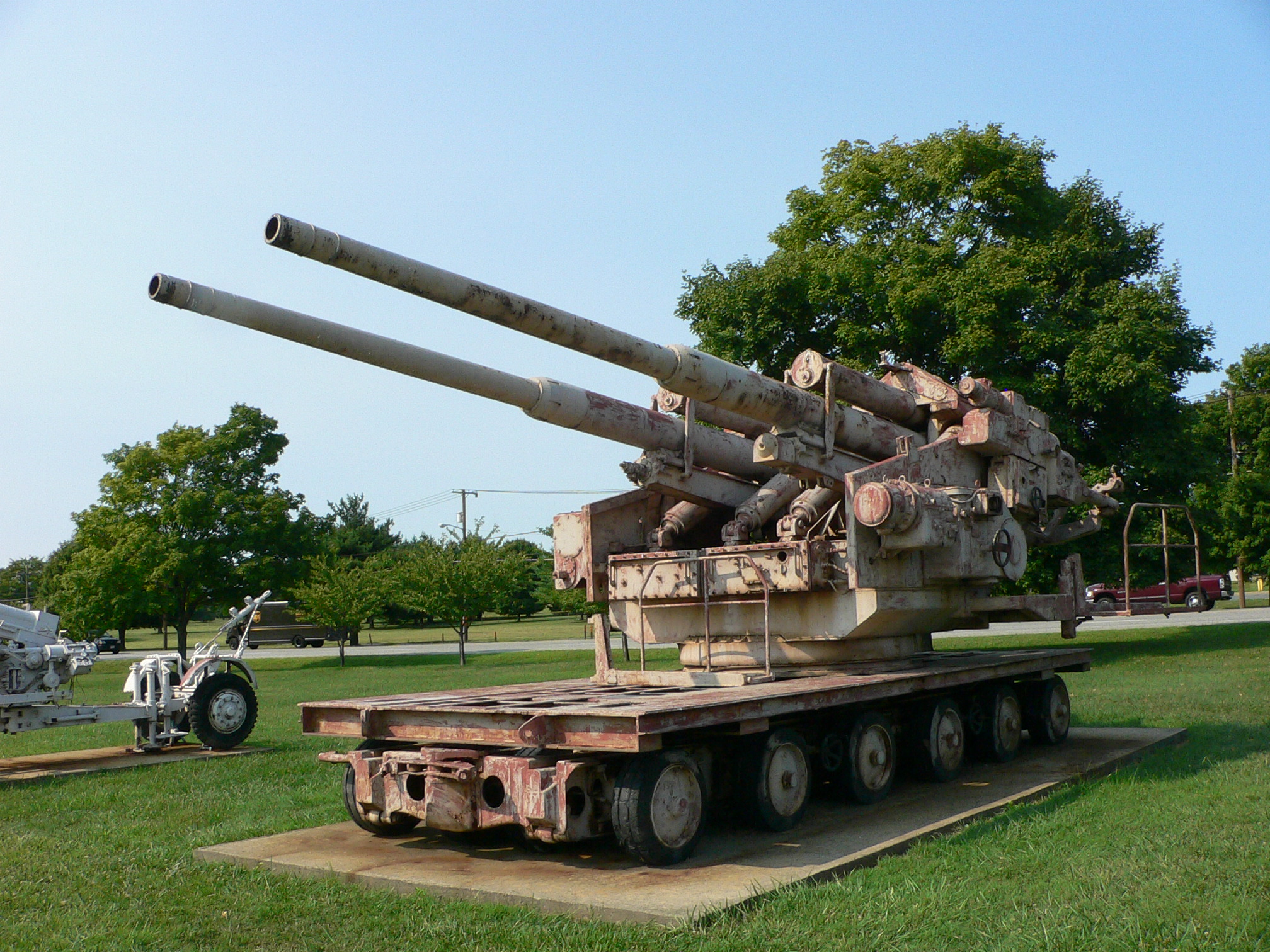
Flakzwilling 40 at US Army Ordnance Museum

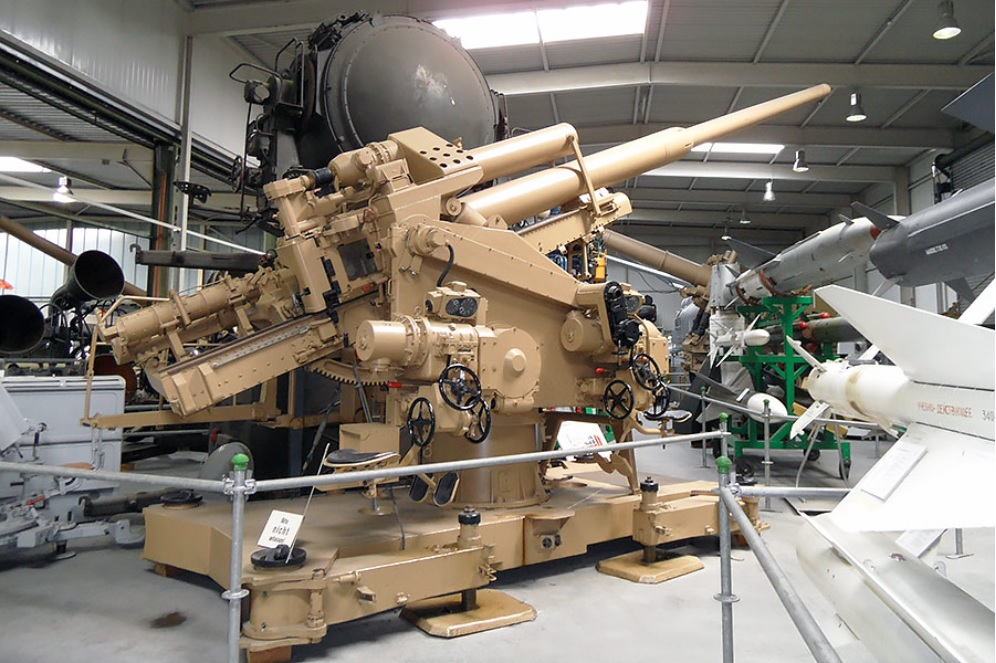
Flak 40/1 at the Bundeswehr Museum of German Defense Technology

== See also ==
=== Weapons of comparable role, performance and era ===
- 120 mm M1 gun, a US gun of almost identical performance.
- QF 4.5-inch gun: British 113 mm heavy anti-aircraft gun firing a slightly lighter shell.
- QF 5.25-inch gun: British 133 mm heavy anti-aircraft gun firing a heavier shell.
- 5"/38 caliber gun: US Navy single/dual purpose shipboard 127 mm heavy anti-aircraft gun firing a slightly lighter shell, used on many U.S. Navy ships built during World War II

== Sources ==
- Gander, Terry and Chamberlain, Peter. Weapons of the Third Reich: An Encyclopedic Survey of All Small Arms, Artillery and Special Weapons of the German Land Forces 1939–1945. New York: Doubleday, 1979 ISBN 0-385-15090-3
- Hogg, Ian V. German Artillery of World War Two. 2nd corrected edition. Mechanicsville, PA: Stackpole Books, 1997 ISBN 1-85367-480-X
- Hogg, Ian V. (2002). Anti-aircraft artillery. Crowood Press. ISBN 1-86126-502-6.
- Müller, Rolf-Dieter (2016). Hitler's Wehrmacht, 1935–1945. Lexington: University Press of Kentucky. ISBN 978-0-81316-738-1.
