= Flak tower =

Air defense towers used by Nazi Germany

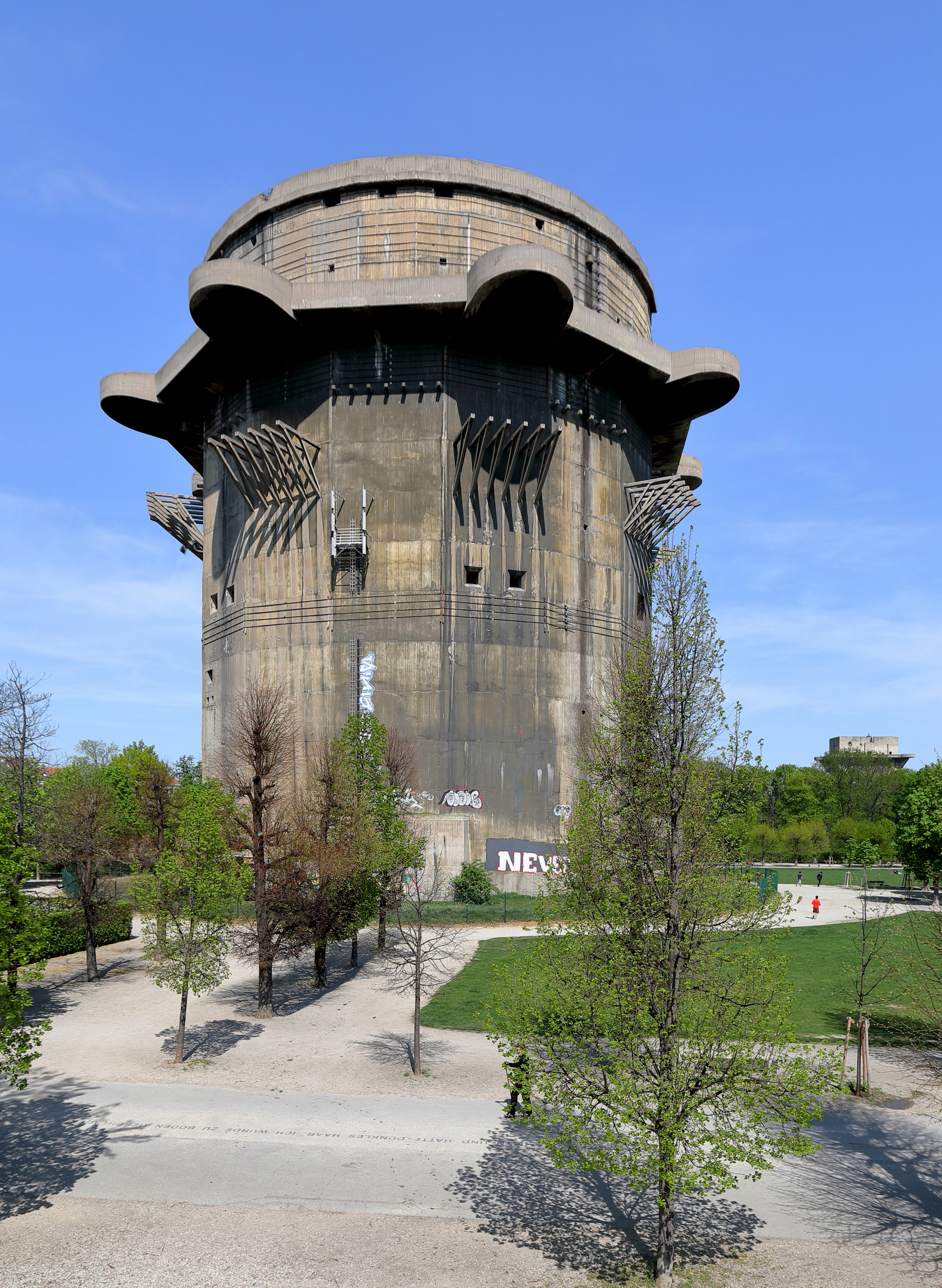
The "G-tower" at Augarten, Vienna. The top of the "L-tower" is visible to the right.

Flak towers (German: Flaktürme) were large, above-ground, anti-aircraft gun blockhouse towers constructed by Nazi Germany. "Flak" is short for anti-aircraft gun in German: Flugabwehrkanone. There were eight flak tower complexes in the cities of Berlin (three), Hamburg (two), and Vienna (three) from 1940. Other cities that used flak towers included Stuttgart and Frankfurt. Smaller single-purpose flak towers were built at outlying German strongpoints, such as at Angers in France and Heligoland in Germany.

The towers were operated by the Luftwaffe to defend against Allied strategic air raids against these cities during World War II. They also served as air-raid shelters for tens of thousands of local civilians.

== History and uses ==
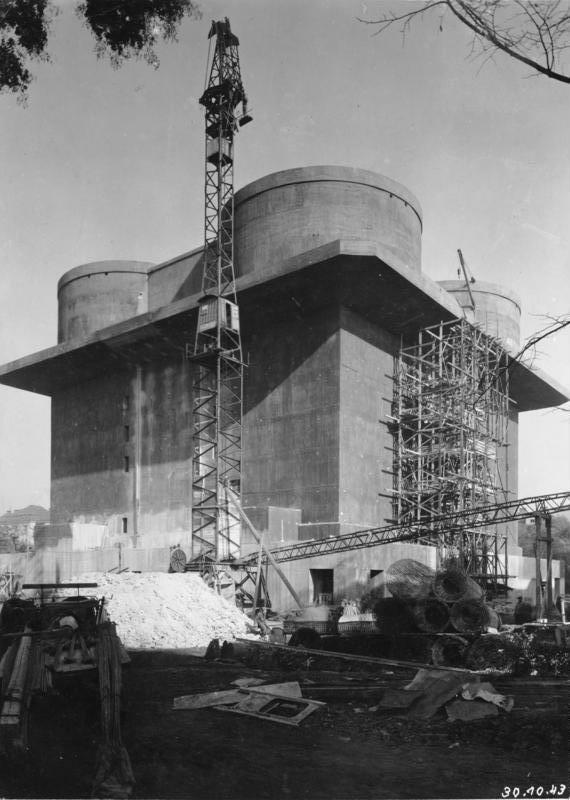
Flak tower during construction (1942)

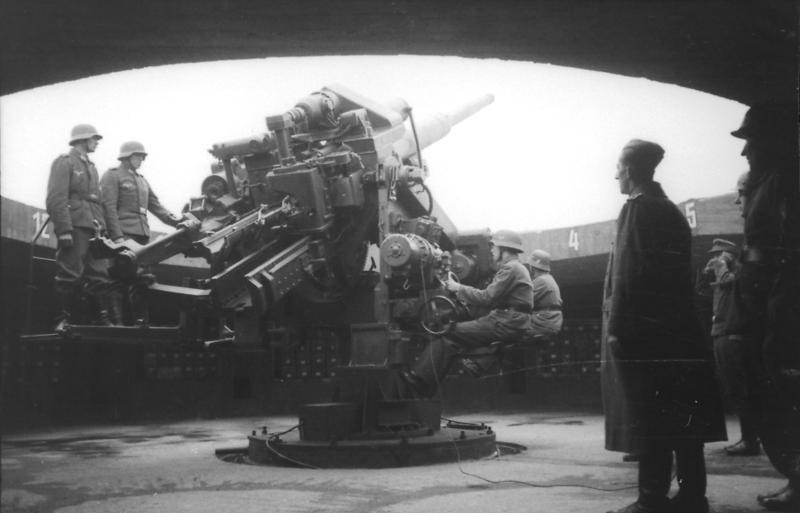
A 12.8 cm FlaK 40, the main guns of the Flak-towers, and its crew

After the RAF raid on Berlin in 1940, Adolf Hitler ordered the construction of three massive flak towers to defend the capital from air attack. Each tower had a radar installation with a radar dish which could be retracted behind a thick concrete and steel dome for protection.

Hitler was interested in the design of the towers, and even made some sketches. They were constructed in six months. The priority of the project was such that the German national rail schedule was altered to facilitate the shipment of concrete, steel and timber to the construction sites.

With concrete walls up to 3.5 m (11 ft) thick, their designers considered the towers to be invulnerable to attack by the standard ordnance carried by RAF heavy bombers at the time of their construction.

The towers were able to sustain a rate of fire of 8,000 rounds per minute from their multi-level guns (albeit mostly smaller-caliber shells, such as the 2cm FlaK 30), with a range of up to 14 km (8.7 mi) in a 360-degree field of fire. However, only the 128 mm (5.0 in) FlaK 40 guns had effective range to defend against the RAF and USAAF heavy bombers. The three flak towers around the outskirts of Berlin created a triangle of anti-aircraft fire that covered the centre of Berlin.

The flak towers had also been designed with the idea of using the above-ground bunkers as a civilian shelter, with room for 10,000 civilians and a hospital ward inside. During the Battle of Berlin, occupants formed their own communities, with up to 30,000 Berliners taking refuge in one tower during the battle. These towers, much like the keeps of medieval castles, were some of the safest places in a fought-over city and so the flak towers were some of the last places to surrender to the Red Army, eventually being forced to capitulate as supplies dwindled.

The Soviets, in their assault on Berlin, found it difficult to inflict significant damage on the flak towers, even with some of the largest Soviet guns, such as the 203 mm M1931 howitzers.

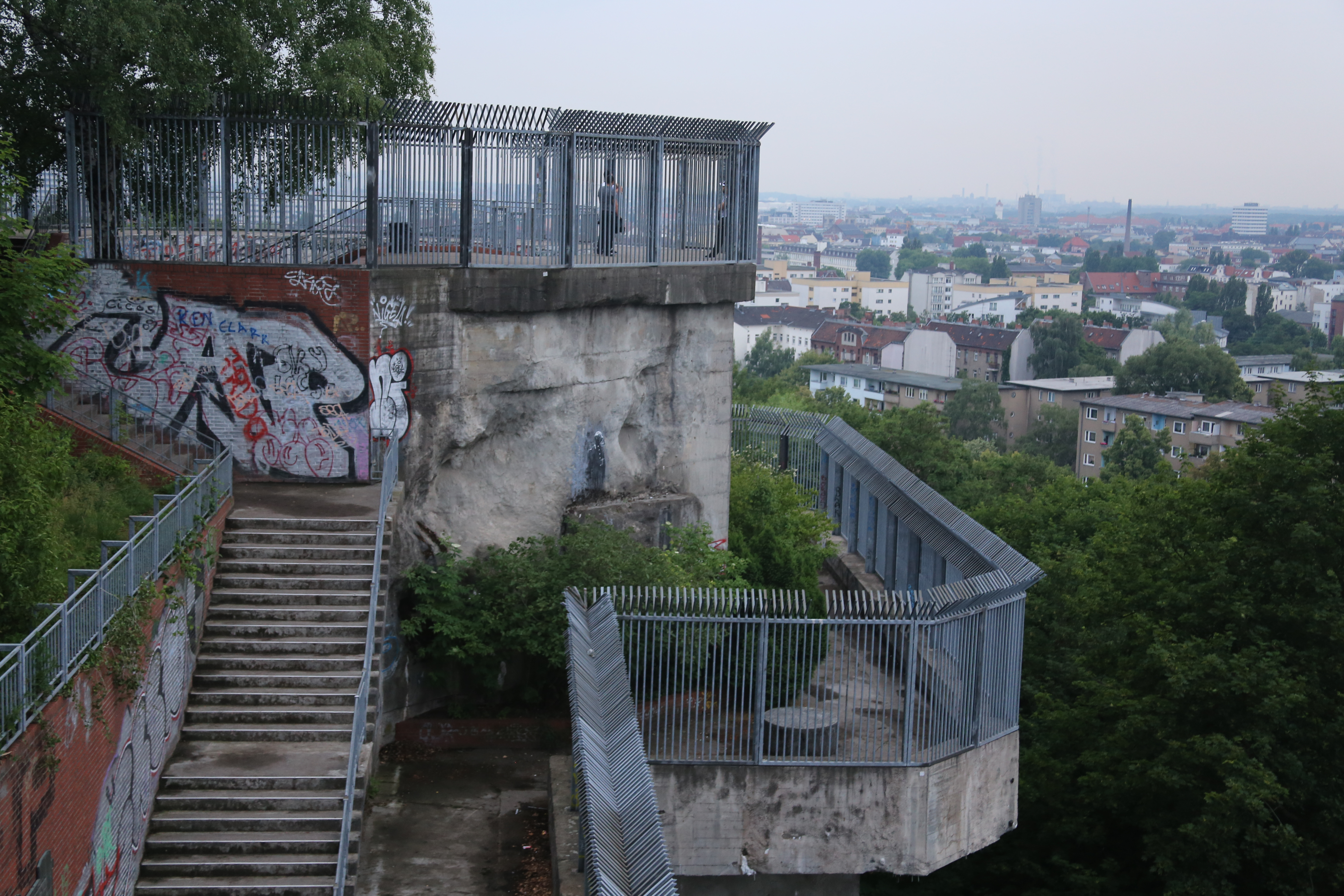
Humboldthain Flak tower today in Berlin

After the war, the demolition of the towers was often considered not feasible and many remain to this day, with some having been converted for alternative use.

== Design iterations ==
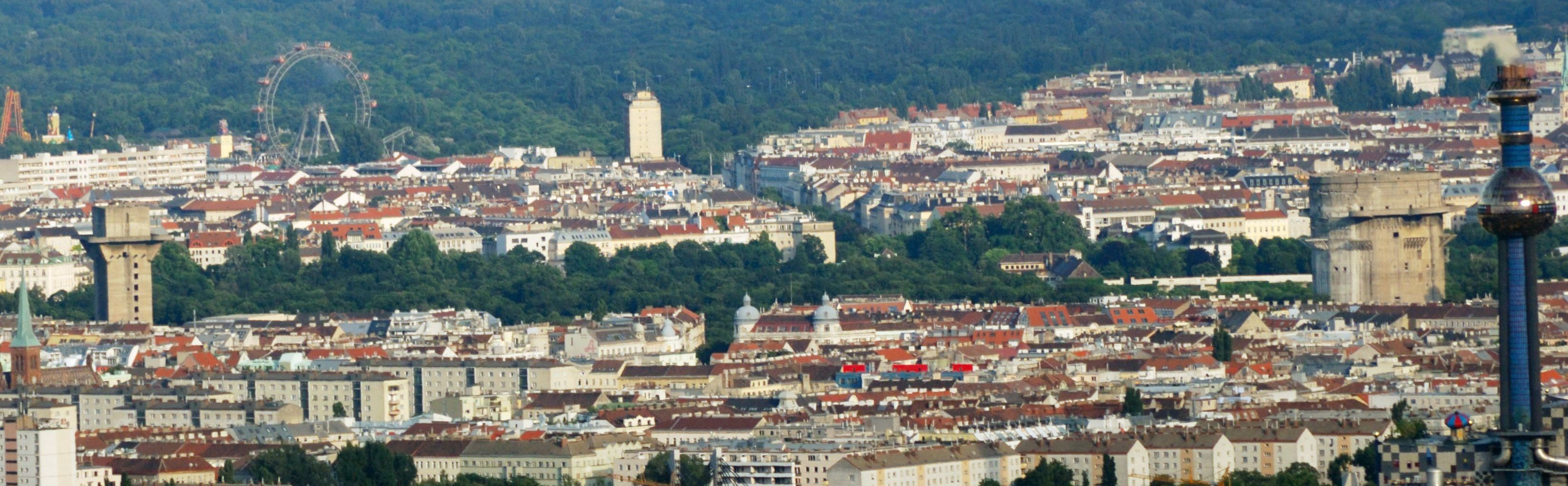
The L- and G-towers in Augarten, Vienna

Each flak tower complex consisted of:

- a G-tower (German: Gefechtsturm) "combat tower", also known as the "gun tower", "battery tower" or "large flak tower",
- an L-tower (German: Leitturm) "lead tower", also known as the "fire-control tower", "command tower", "listening bunker" or "small flak tower".

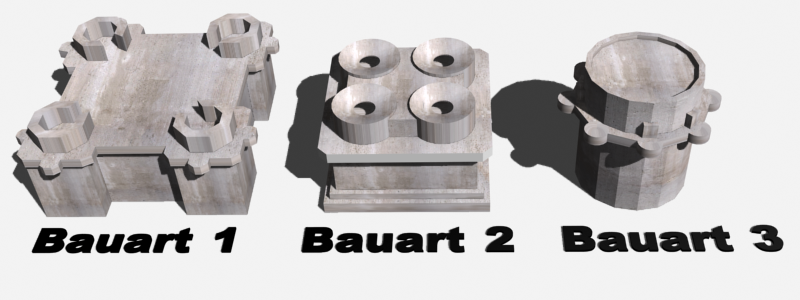
The three generations of G-tower

Generation 1
The G-Towers were 70.5 m (231 ft) square and 39 m (128 ft) tall, usually armed with eight (four twin) 12.8 cm FlaK 40 and numerous 37 mm Flak and 32 (eight quadruple) 20 mm Flakvierling guns. L-towers were 50 m × 23 m × 39 m (164 ft × 75 ft × 128 ft), usually armed with four quadruple 20 mm guns.
Generation 2
G-Towers were 57 m × 57 m × 41.6 m (187 ft × 187 ft × 136 ft), usually armed with eight (four twin) 128 mm guns and sixteen (four quadruple) 20 mm guns. L-towers were 50 m × 23 m × 44 m (164 ft × 75 ft × 144 ft), usually armed with forty (ten quadruple) 20 mm guns.
Generation 3
The G-Towers were 43 m × 43 m × 54 m (141 ft × 141 ft × 177 ft), usually armed with eight (four twin) 128 mm guns and thirty-two (eight quadruple) 20 mm guns.

The evaluation of even larger battery towers was commissioned by Adolf Hitler. These would have been three times the size and firepower of flak towers.

== Towers ==
=== Flakturm I – Zoo Tower – Berliner Zoo, Berlin ===
The tower built near the Berlin Zoo was the first-generation type and covered the government district. It was also used as a repository for artefacts from the Berlin Museum. The occupants surrendered to Soviets on 30 April 1945. In 1947 the British blew up the G-tower on the second attempt with several tons of explosives. The L-tower was demolished first in July.

=== Flakturm II – Friedrichshain, Berlin ===
- Friedrichshain (1st generation)
  - G-tower was partially demolished after the war; one side remains visible. The tower was caught in low-level aerial footage of the ruined city in 1945. 52.526522°N 13.431886°E
  - L-tower was demolished after the war. 52.527884°N 13.438582°E

The towers kept part of the collection of the Kaiser Friedrich Museum. In May 1945, several fires destroyed some of the collections. In total, more than 400 paintings and about 300 sculptures were missing due to looting during the fire or destroyed in the fire itself, including the works of Old Masters.

Both towers were covered over and now appear to be natural hills in Volkspark Friedrichshain. The G-tower, known as Mont Klamott (Rubble Mountain) in Berlin, was the inspiration for songs by singer-songwriter Wolf Biermann and the rock band Silly.

=== Flakturm III – Humboldthain, Berlin ===
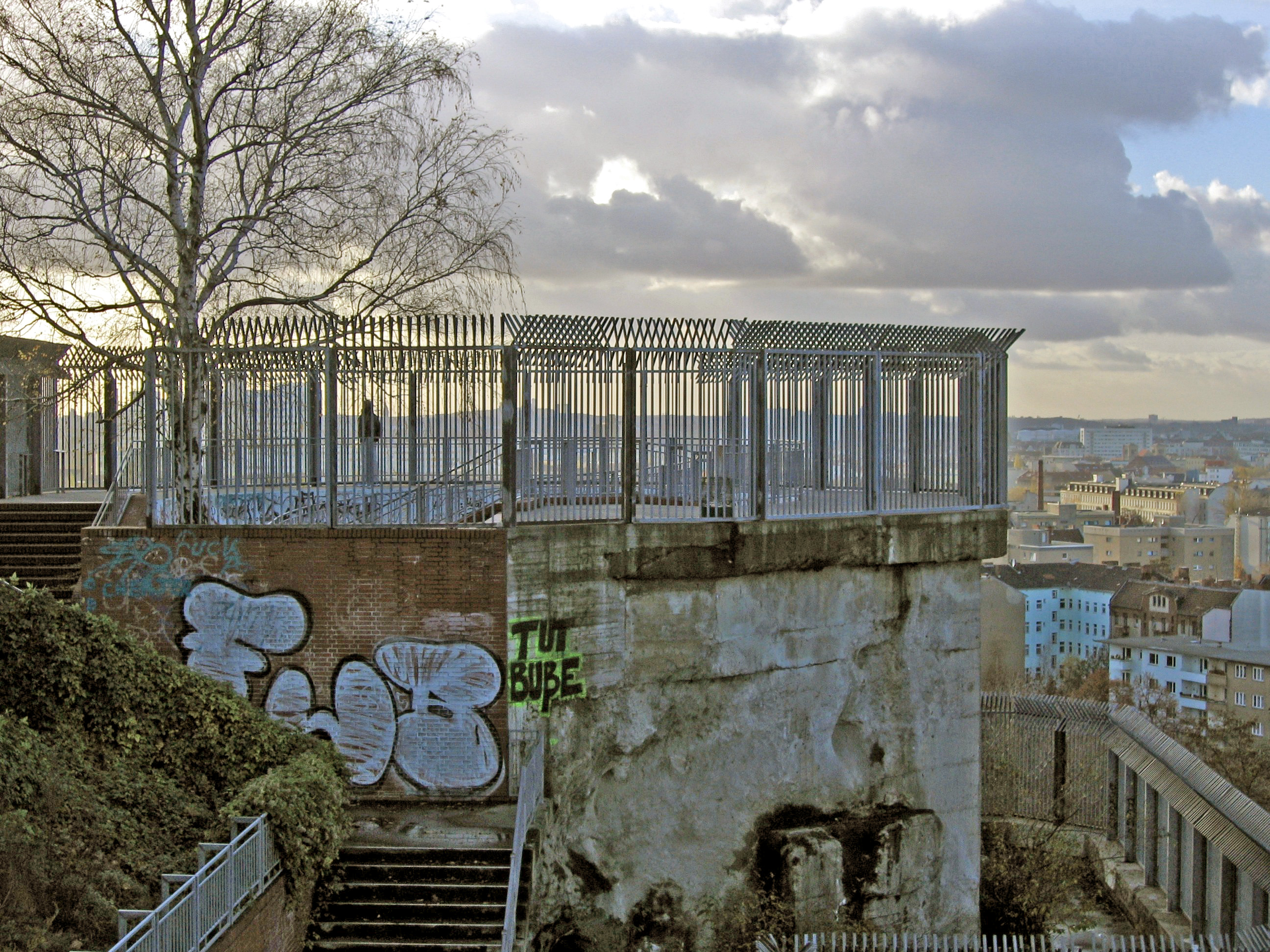
Flakturm III G-tower

The third of the first-generation flak towers were built at Humboldthain. The G-tower was partially demolished after the war; one side remains visible. The interior can be visited. 52.547238°N 13.384961°E. The L-tower was partially demolished after the war; some walls remain visible. 52.544092°N 13.387326°E

=== Flakturm IV – Heiligengeistfeld, Hamburg ===
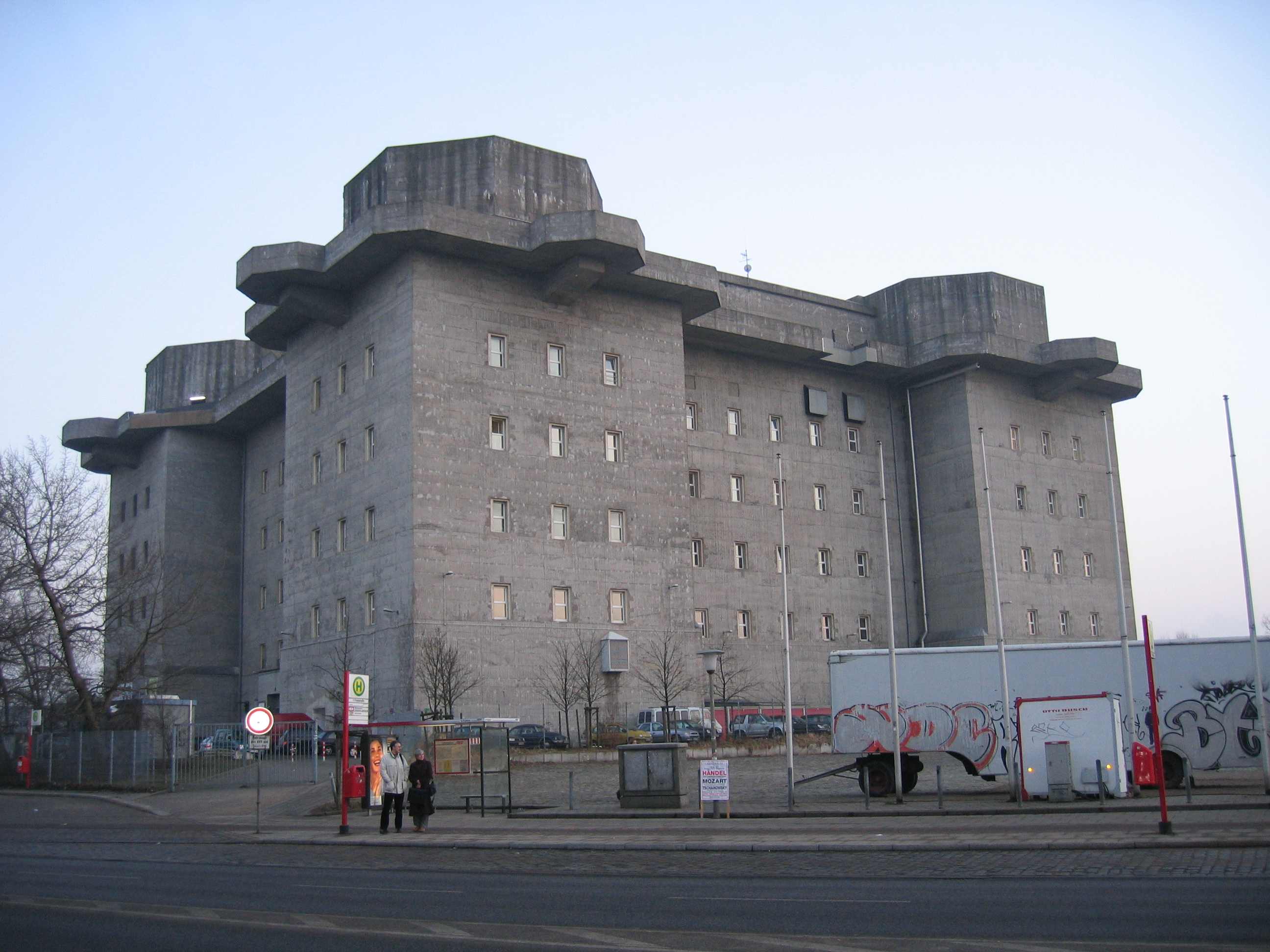
Heiligengeistfeld G-tower in 2006

Heiligengeistfeld (1st generation) 53.556212°N 9.970104°E

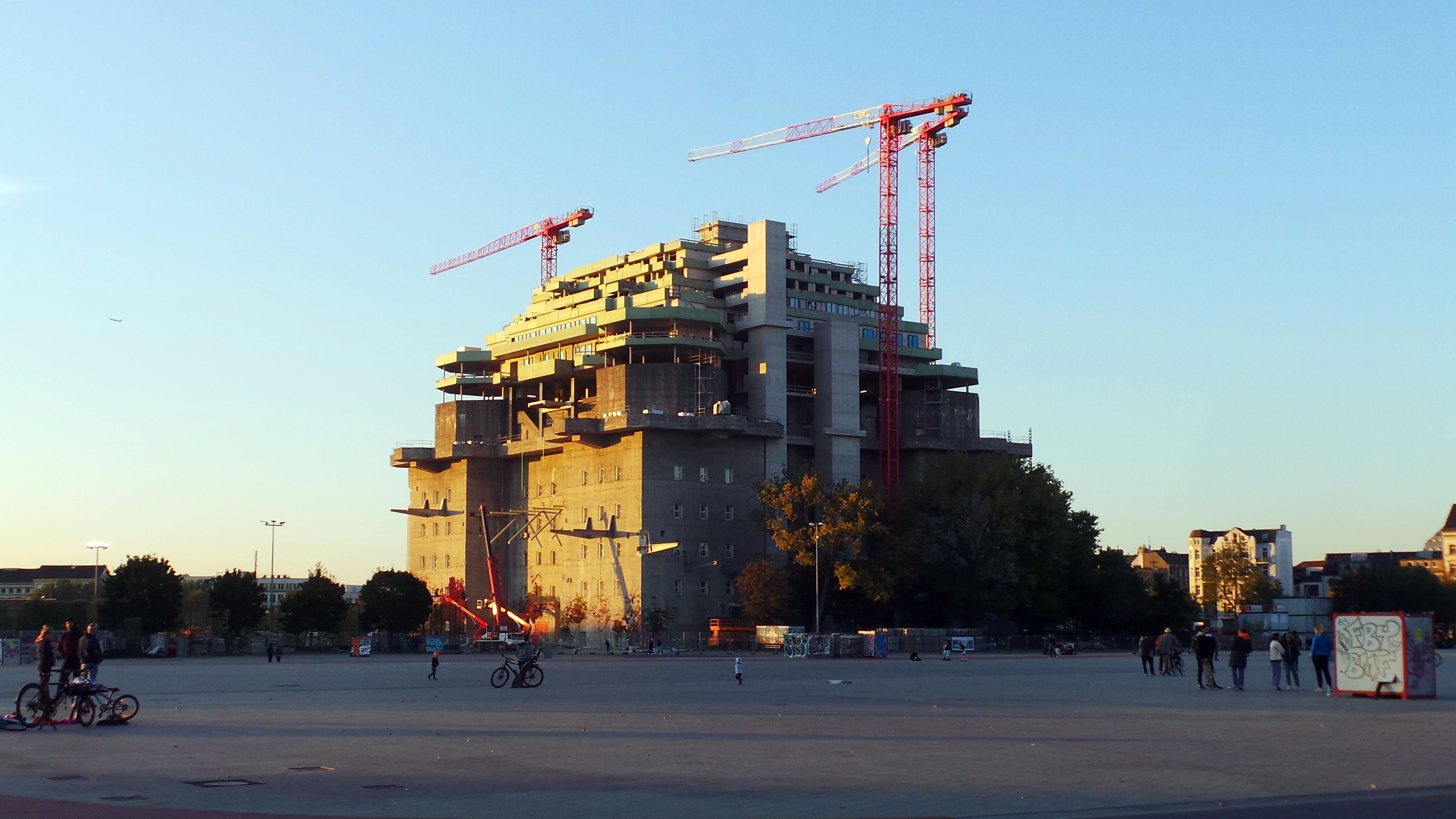
Heiligengeistfeld G-tower undergoing additional construction in 2021

This tower contains six levels below the rooftop and includes in its design, as part of its air-raid shelter, two identical spaces for protection against gas attacks. One is located on the first floor (above ground level) and the other on the second floor. Both in Tower 1, they are about 300 m^{2} (3,200 sq ft) in area and have six windows (openings in the wall).

The L-tower was demolished after the war 53.55285°N 9.967314°E. The G-tower was transformed into a nightclub with a music school and music shops. In 2019 the NH Hotel Group announced plans to turn it into a luxury hotel with a rooftop garden. Construction was planned to take place in 2021 and opening in 2022. After the reconstruction the height was to increase to 58 m, with five additional floors. There were to be thirteen stairs.

The construction was completed 2 years behind schedule in 2024, The hotel, called "Reverb", first opened in April, with a capacity of 134 guest rooms. The rooftop garden opened in July and contains 4,700 trees and shrubs.

=== Flakturm V – Stiftskaserne, Vienna ===
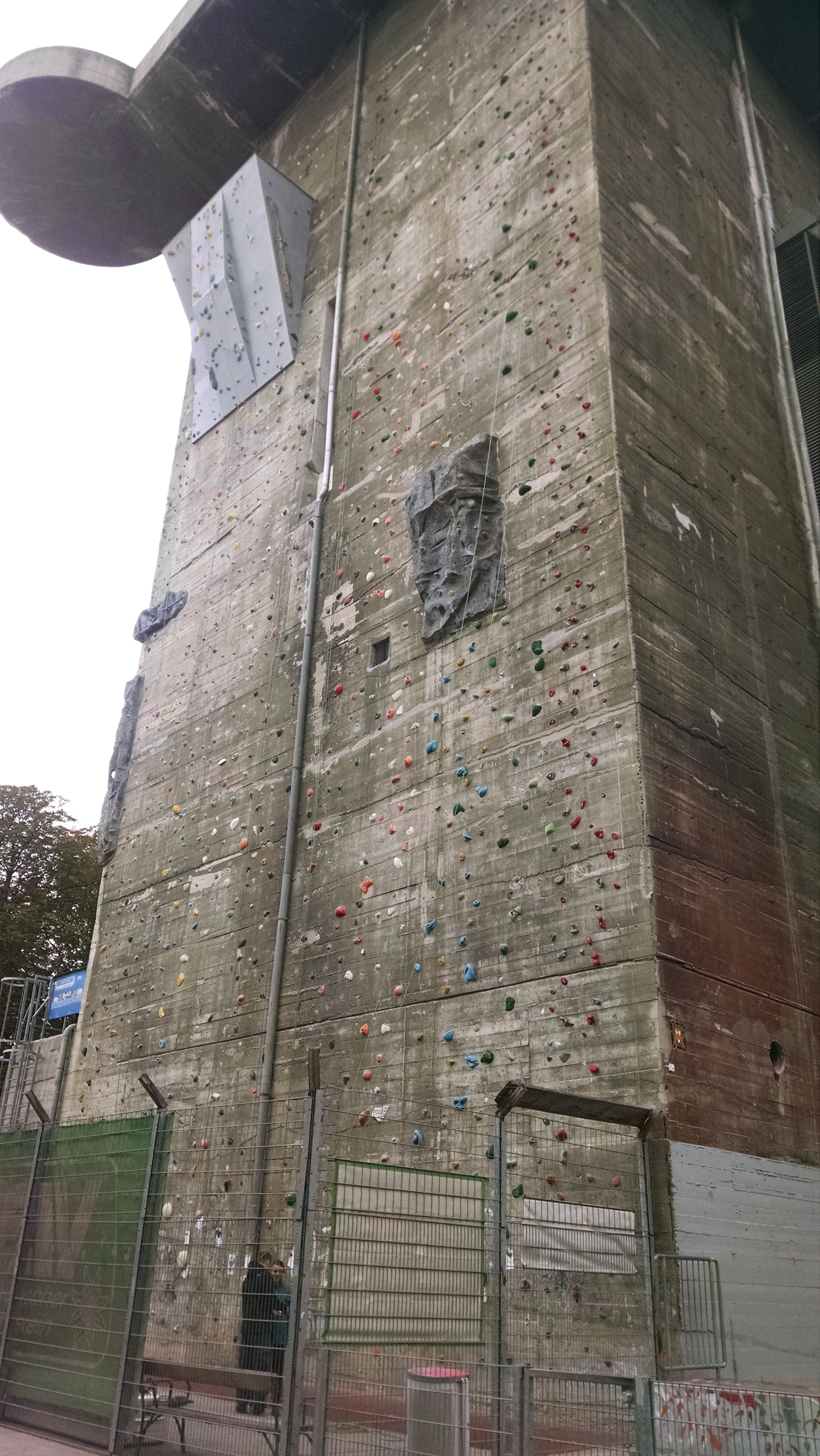
Kletterzentrum Flakturm wall – Vienna, Austria

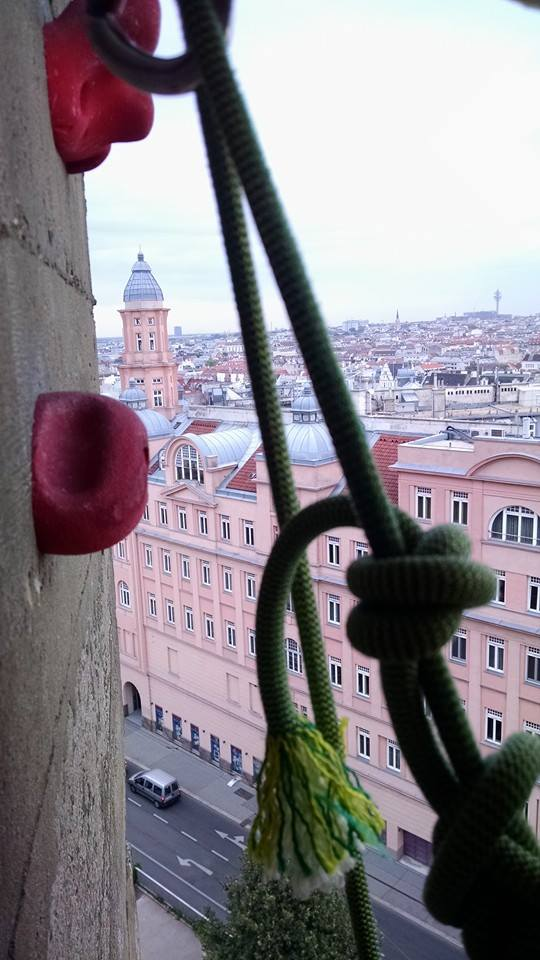
View from the top of the Kletterzentrum Flakturm wall in Vienna

- Stiftskaserne (3rd generation)
  - G-tower's interior is used by the Austrian Army. 48.201734°N 16.355853°E
  - L-tower (in Esterhazypark) has been used as a public aquarium, the Haus des Meeres, since 1957. 48.197719°N 16.352495°E
  - The outside of the L-tower was re-purposed as an outdoor climbing wall.

=== Flakturm VI – Wilhelmsburg, Hamburg ===
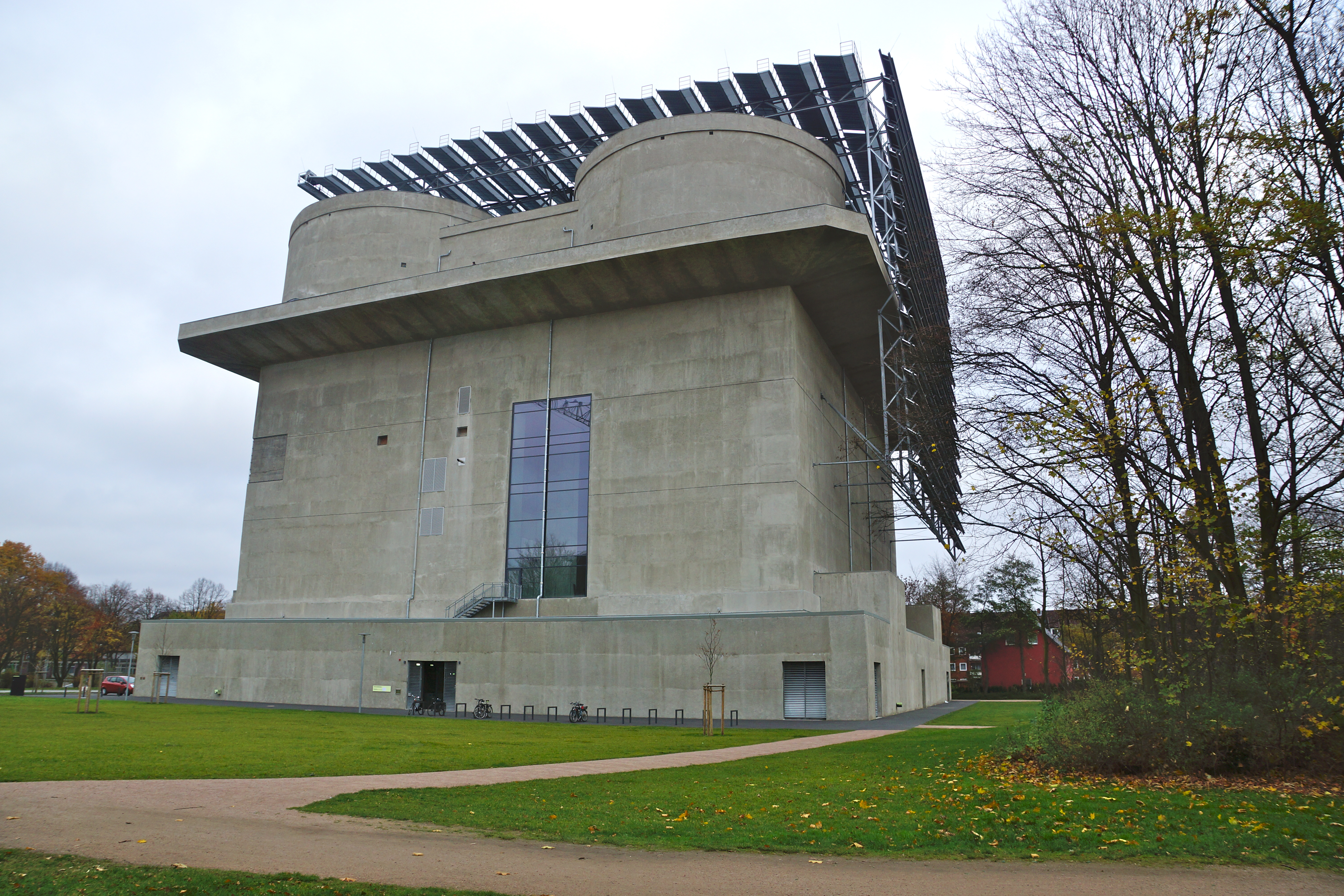
Wilhelmsburg G-tower

The tower at Wilhelmsburg is a 2nd-generation type. The G-tower remains to this day, 53.51006°N 9.98993°E, the L-tower was demolished after the war.

=== Flakturm VII – Augarten, Vienna ===
Augarten (3rd generation) G-tower remains empty. The entire north-east and half of the east 20 mm gun platforms, including the connecting walkways, were removed in 2007 due to deterioration. The tower itself has been reinforced with steel cables encircling the entire structure: 12 cables are located above the gun nests, 6 just below, and an additional 4 midway up the tower. The tower is home to thousands of pigeons, which nest on every platform and opening. The tower suffered an internal explosion, and several floors near the top are missing on one side. The west side of the structure is also used as a cellular communications tower. 48.22563°N 16.372815°E L-tower remains empty. Its use as a computer storage facility or an open-air cinema is being considered. 48.227896°N 16.377992°E

=== Flakturm VIII – Arenbergpark, Vienna ===
- Arenbergpark (2nd generation) 48.198448°N 16.391489°E
  - G-tower is used as a storehouse for art.
  - L-tower remains empty.

== Planned towers (not built) ==
=== Berlin ===
- Tiergarten (two additional planned, not built)
- Hasenheide in Neukölln (planned, not built, had been built in Hamburg instead)
- Reichstag (considered for modification, but found unsuitable)

=== Bremen ===
- Bremen Neustadt Contrescarpe (two planned, none built)

=== Hamburg ===
- East Hamburg (planned, not built)

=== Munich ===
- München Hauptbahnhof (eight planned, none built)

=== Vienna ===
- Original plans were to place the three towers in Schmelz, Prater and Floridsdorf.

== See also ==
- Battle of Berlin
- Defence of the Reich
- Nazi architecture
- Martello tower
