= Bechstein =

Bechstein is a German surname. Notable people with the surname include:

- Carl Bechstein, German piano manufacturer who founded C. Bechstein Pianofortefabrik
- Edwin Bechstein (1859–1934), German piano manufacturer and son of Carl
- Helene Bechstein (1876–1951), German socialite and businesswoman
- Johann Matthäus Bechstein (1757–1822), German naturalist and forester
- Ludwig Bechstein (1801–1860), German writer
