= Wealth of Adolf Hitler =

Adolf Hitler, dictator of Germany from 1933 to 1945, earned millions of Euros(€) throughout his political career, mainly through sales of his book Mein Kampf ('my struggle') and his combined chancellor's and president's salaries. After coming to power, Hitler made himself tax-exempt.

== Early life and artistic income ==
Hitler was born in and grew up in a poor family in Braunau am Inn, a small Austrian village. Three of his siblings – Gustav, Ida, and Otto – died in infancy. Hitler's mother, Klara, was a homemaker; his father, Alois, unsuccessfully tried to establish a farm and worked as a civil servant. After going through high school in Linz, he moved to Vienna where he was initially supported by his mother and orphan's benefits.

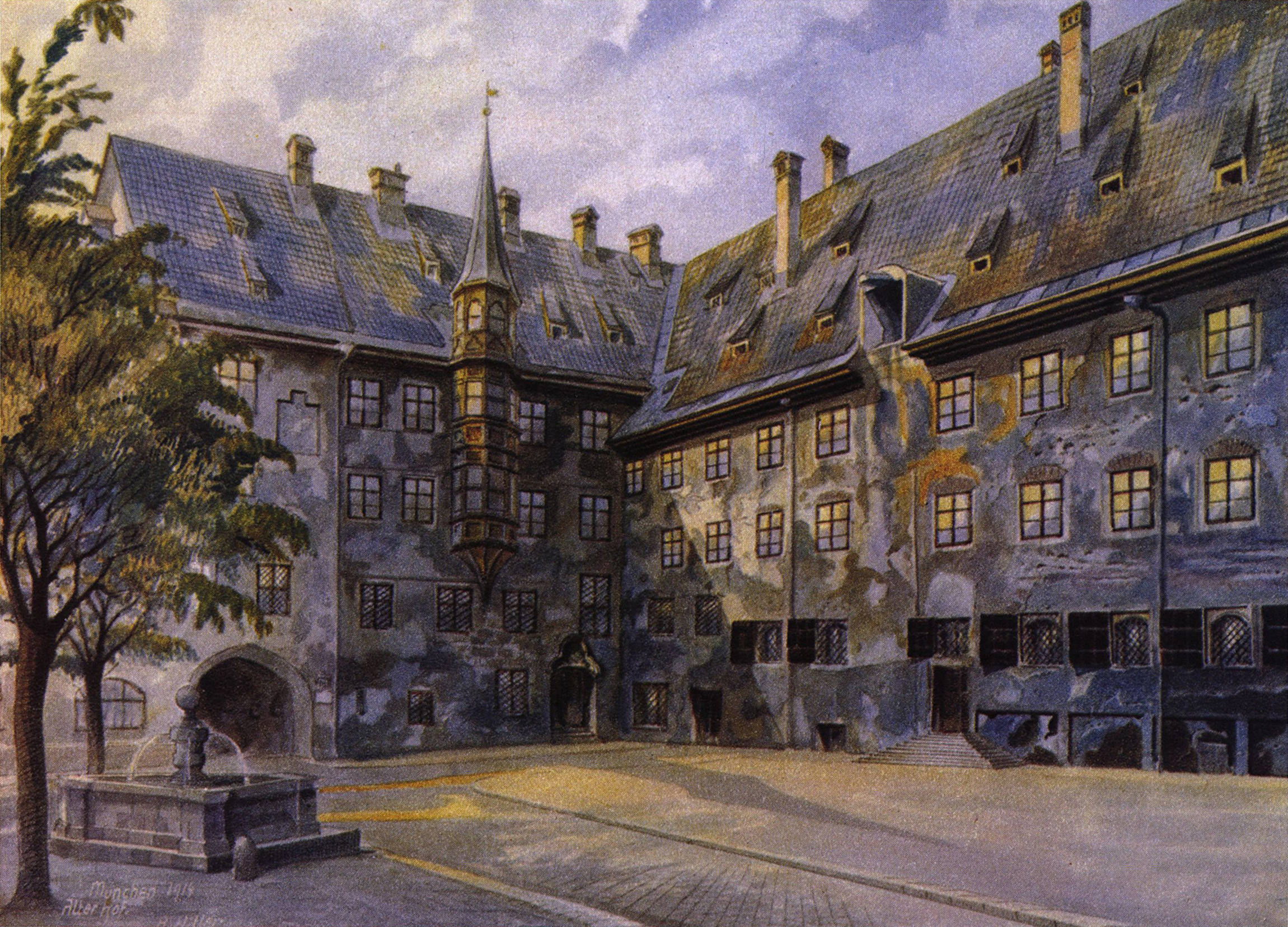
The Courtyard of the Old Residency in Munich, painting by Hitler from 1914

Once in Vienna, Hitler lived a Bohemian life alongside his childhood friend August Kubizek. The two shared a room rented from a local tailor. Hitler painted pictures, watercolours, and copied postcards and sold them to tourists for a small profit. In 1907, he applied to join Vienna's Academy of Fine Arts, but was rejected due to a "lack of talent". In 1908, Hitler tried again, but was once again rejected. Shortly afterwards, Hitler ran out of money and was forced to live in homeless shelters and men's hostels. Although receiving a monthly orphan's pension of 25 kronen, this was not enough to subsist on and he found some income by clearing snow and carrying luggage for rail passengers. In 1909, Hitler made the acquaintance of Reinhold Hanisch, who suggested that Hitler should ask for help from his relatives and a gift of 50 kronen arrived from his Aunt Johanna, enabling him to buy a new coat. At Hanisch's suggestion, he began to paint scenes of Vienna which Hanisch sold for him. The income from this enterprise allowed Hitler to move into a more respectable men's home in the north of Vienna.

In 1913, Hitler turned 24 and was eligible to receive a legacy from his deceased father amounting to 820 kronen. In May 1913 he left Vienna for Munich, where he began painting watercolours of local tourist sights which he then sold in cafés and beerhalls. He was able to make a modest living in this way, and later reported to the authorities that he was earning around 1,200 marks per month during this period.

== First World War ==
Although Hitler later claimed that at the outbreak of the First World War he petitioned the King of Bavaria for permission to serve in the Bavarian Army because he was still an Austrian citizen, a post-war inquiry established that his status as a foreigner went unnoticed in the first frenzied days of enlistment. After brief training, Hitler saw action with his infantry regiment at the First Battle of Ypres. Shortly afterwards, he was promoted to corporal and assigned to the regimental headquarters as a runner to carry messages to forward units, a role he continued in until the end of the war.

Hitler remained in the army after the Armistice of 11 November 1918, staying on the payroll until March 1920. After some time idle in camps and barracks, he guarded an internment camp. Hitler's wages at that time were 40 marks per month plus a bonus of 4 marks for testing old gas masks. In June 1919, he was sent on a course of anti-Bolshevik instruction at the Ludwig-Maximilians-Universität München, following which he became a military agent for the Reichswehr.

== Mein Kampf sales ==
Hitler wrote his political manifesto and autobiography Mein Kampf ('my struggle') in Landsberg prison while serving a sentence for high treason committed during the failed Beer Hall Putsch of 1923. Mein Kampf was printed by the Franz Eher Nachfolger publishing house and largely ignored at first, but sales began to boom in the late 1920s and early 1930s as economic depression and social unrest troubled Germany, factors which significantly boosted Hitler's popularity. After Hitler came to power in 1933, couples who married during the Nazi state were given a copy as a wedding gift. The book eventually became a bestseller within Germany, selling almost twelve million copies by the war's end.

== Nazi Party leadership ==
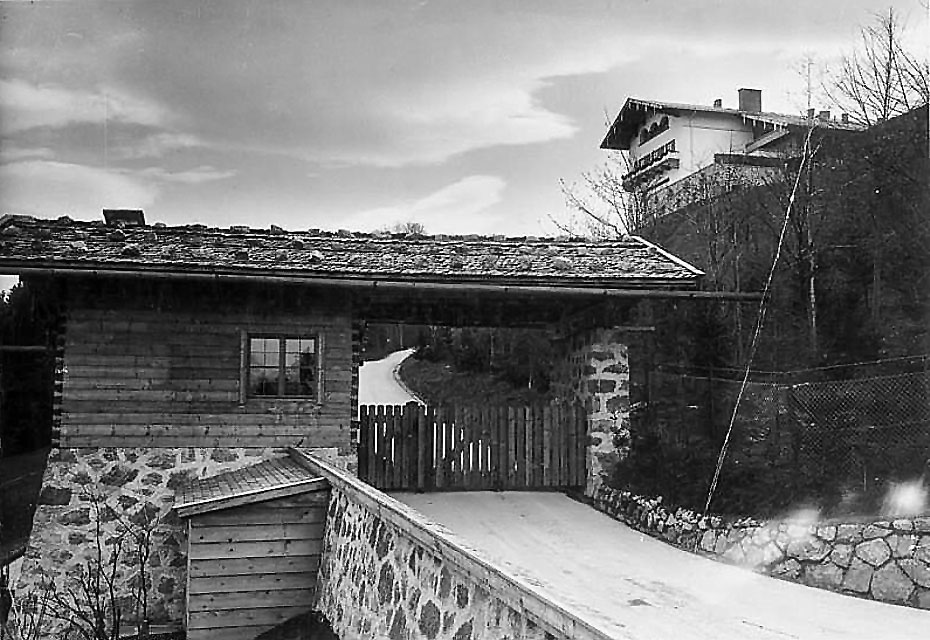
The Berghof, Hitler's private retreat.

As leader of the Nazi Party, Hitler never took a formal salary, although the party covered living expenses and the costs of his commitments, such as acquisition of vehicles for his motorcade. Nazi Party funds were later used to pay for the significant renovation and expansion of Hitler's Berghof, his mountain residence in the Obersalzberg, and later for the construction of the Eagle's Nest, which Hitler rarely visited.

Nazi Party funds were themselves largely derived from grassroots fundraising, including donations from party members and supporters. In the 1920s, the party received support from several wealthy donors and patrons, however, according to Henry Ashby Turner, party records show these represented a minority of donations. Early wealthy patrons of Hitler included Edwin and Helene Bechstein, whose family manufactured pianos. In 1925, Hitler used party funds to purchase a Mercedes-Benz and for the hiring of a chauffeur, for a total expenditure of 20,000 ℛ︁ℳ︁, equivalent to €85,509 in 2021.

Prior to Hitler's rise to power in 1933, the Nazi Party lacked significant support from the business establishment. While a small number of industrialists made donations, including steel baron Fritz Thyssen, this was largely in an effort to hedge bets while making much larger donations to mainstream parties. Following Hitler's rise to power, Thyssen and the industrialist Gustav Krupp donated almost 5 million ℛ︁ℳ︁ to the Nazi Party through the 1930s. In 1939, Thyssen's conglomerate was nationalized when he expressed disapproval of Nazi policies, and he was later imprisoned in a concentration camp.

According to Richard J Evans, Hitler and the Nazi party derived strength from the fact they were not dependent on wealthy business donors or bureaucratic institutions for financial support.

== Tax evasion ==
Throughout his rise to power, Hitler neglected to pay taxes on his income and allowances. In 1934, one year after becoming chancellor, the tax office of Munich sent Hitler a fine of 405,494 ℛ︁ℳ︁, equivalent to €1.92 million in 2021, for failing to declare his income or file tax returns. He was given only eight days to pay off this debt. Hitler responded by ordering a state secretary of the ministry of finance to intervene, and became tax-exempt. The head of the Munich tax office declared: "All tax reports delivering substance for a tax obligation by the Führer are annulled from the start. The Führer is therefore tax-exempt." After the death of President Paul von Hindenburg, Hitler took over his office and claimed his salary as well.

In his last will and testament, Hitler left his entire estate to the German government:

What I own, as far as it is worth anything, belongs to the party. Should this no longer exist, the German state. Should the state also be destroyed, there is no need for a further decision on my part [...].

== Sources ==
- Bullock, Alan (1952). Hitler: A Study in Tyranny. Konecky & Konecky. OCLC 33389757.
- Kershaw, Ian (1999) [1998]. Hitler: 1889–1936: Hubris. New York: W.W. Norton & Company. ISBN 978-0-393-04671-7.
- Markus, Hugh (1997). The History of the German Public Accounting Profession. Taylor & Francis. ISBN 978-0815330103.
- Shirer, William Lawrence (1960), The Rise and Fall of the Third Reich: A History of Nazi Germany, New York City: Simon & Schuster, ASIN B0766DKDLR, LCCN 60006729, OCLC 1286630, OL 5794925M, Wikidata Q138029595
- Wells, Michael; Wells, Mike (2011). History for the IB Diploma: Causes, Practices and Effects of Wars. Cambridge University. ISBN 978-0521189316.
- Cesarani, David. "Nazi Underworld: Hitler's Money". National Geographic Channel. Archived from the original on 13 September 2012.
- Kotanko, Florian. "House of Responsibility - Braunau, Austria". House of Responsibility. Archived from the original on 13 November 2013.
- "A Rich Hitler Evaded Taxes, Magazine Says". Los Angeles Times. AP. 3 January 1987.
