= Agnes Stavenhagen =

German operatic soprano

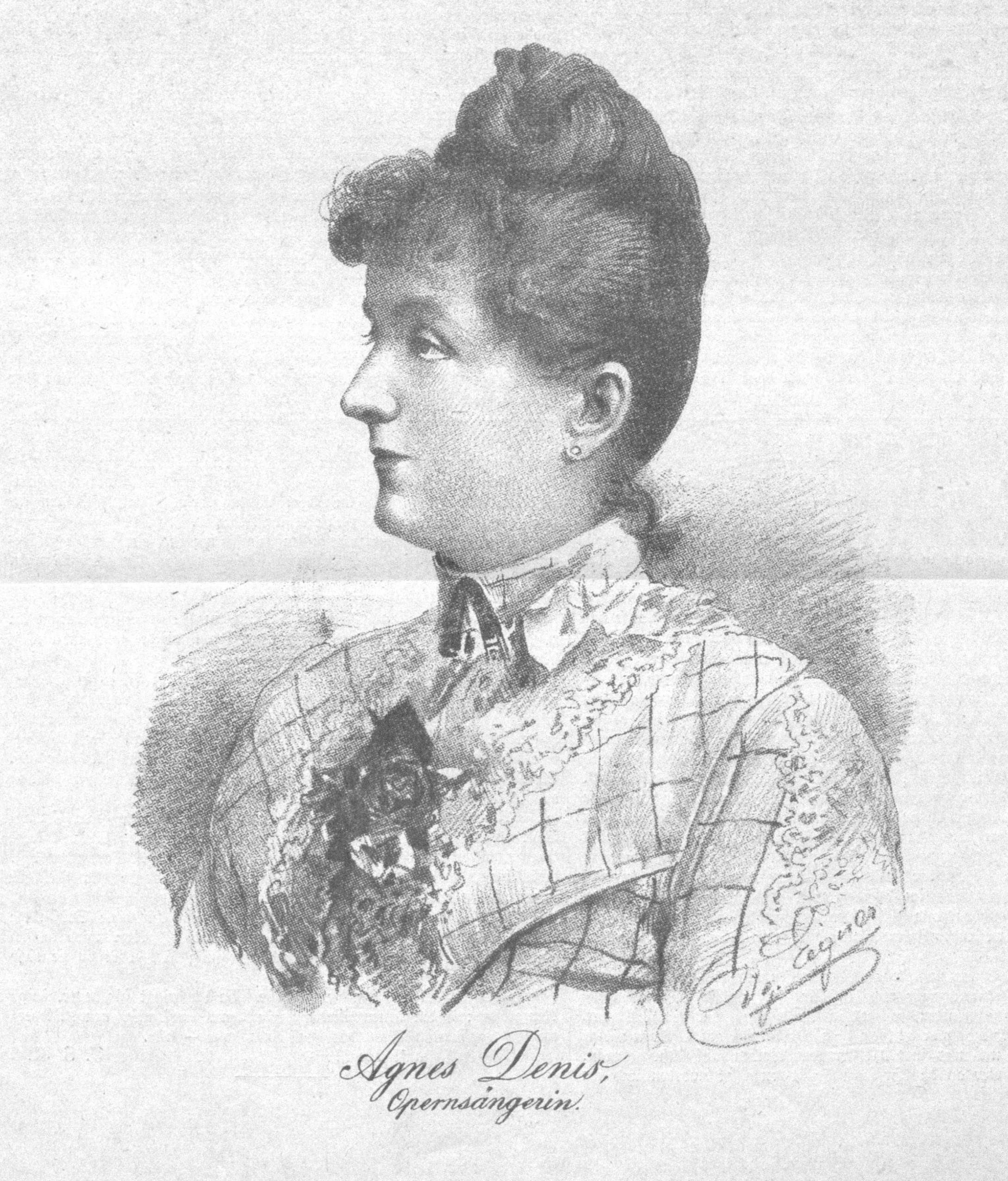
- Agnes Denis in 1889, lithography by Ignaz Eigner
- Born: Agnes Caroline Elise Franzisca Denninghoff; 3 September 1860; Winsen
- Died: 30 September 1945 (aged 85); Bautzen
- Other names: Agnes Denis
- Occupations: Operatic soprano; Voice teacher
- Spouse: Bernhard Stavenhagen

Agnes Stavenhagen (3 September 1860 – 30 September 1945), pseudonym Agnes Denis, was a German operatic soprano. Through her work at the Weimarer Hoftheater and in concerts throughout Europe, she was a highly esteemed Kammersängerin and achieved great popularity during her lifetime. She was soprano soloist in the first performance in Munich of Mahler's Second Symphony in 1900, conducted by the composer.

== Life ==
=== Childhood and family ===
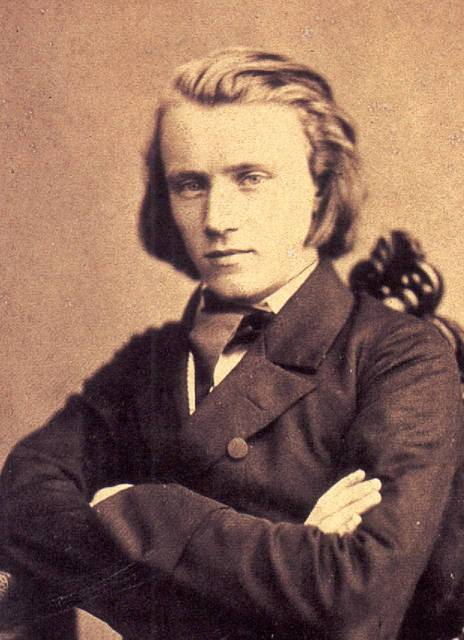
Johannes Brahms in 1853

She was born Agnes Caroline Elise Franzisca Denninghoff in Winsen, the daughter of Anton Bernhard Denninghoff and Elise Denninghoff, a childhood friend of Johannes Brahms. Her grandfather was Adolph Heinrich Giesemann, an early patron of Brahms. The composer stayed with him in Winsen several times from 1847.

On 24 October 1860, Agnes was baptised in the Marienkirche in Winsen. In 1866, Agnes and her family left Winsen and moved to Bremerhaven, and only a short time later on to Heppens, now part of Wilhelmshaven, where her father founded a hotel. There Agnes was confirmed on 29 March 1875 in the Garnisonkirche.

=== Education ===
At the age of 18, Denninghoff began training as a concert singer at the Königlich Akademische Hochschule für Musik in Berlin in October 1879, in a class of 16 trained by Anna Schultzen-van Asten. From her second year, Brahms helped secretly to finance her studies, but she was unable to complete them because of her parents' insolvency in 1882. She left Berlin with a diploma (Abschlusszeugnis). Back in Wilhelmshaven, she travelled regionally as a Concertsängerin and performed with chamber musicians of the Grand Duchy of Oldenburg. From 1884, she was able, thanks to an anonymous patron, to study for the stage Richard Wagner's niece, Johanna Jachmann-Wagner who had appeared as Elisabeth in the world premiere of his Tannhäuser. Deninghoff finished her education with her in Munich in 1886.

=== Career ===
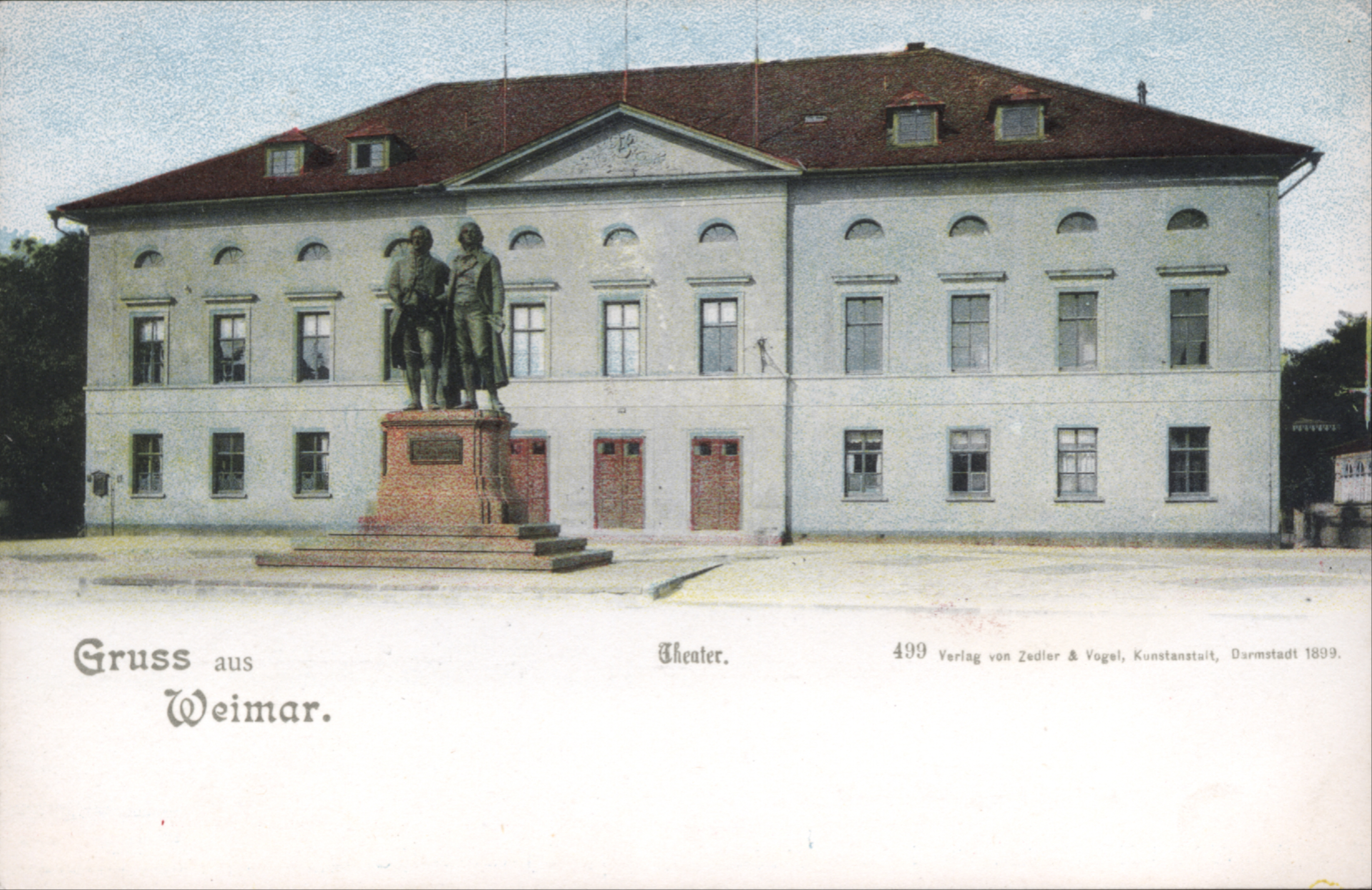
The Weimar court theatre in 1899

Denninghoff went to Weimar in 1886, where she sang at the court theatre for 12 years, performing under the stage name Agnes Denis. There she made her debut on 8 September as Margarethe in Gounod's Faust. Other roles included Pamina in Mozart's Die Zauberflöte and Elsa in Wagner's Lohengrin. She also worked together with Richard Strauss, who became second Kapellmeister in 1889. In 1890, she married the pianist and composer Bernhard Stavenhagen in Weimar. From 1891, she travelled through Europe as a celebrated soprano, performing in London, Glasgow, Edinburgh, Vienna and in St. Petersburg in 1898. In 1893, Grand Duke Karl Alexander awarded her the title "Großherzoglich Sächsische Kammersängerin".

In 1894, she received offers from New York City, but she turned them down in favour of her husband who was to become Hofkapellmeister in Weimar. In 1898, the couple moved to Munich. There, she continued her success as a concert singer and from there toured many cities in Germany. Stavenhagen appeared in 1900 in the first performance in Munich of Gustav Mahler's Second Symphony, with the composer conducting the Kaim Orchestra with additional players from the court orchestra, with contralto Elise Feinhals, the Porgesçher Choral Society and the Lehrergesangverein. This performance was regarded there as Mahler's breakthrough as a composer. The Munich Allgemeine Zeitung praised Stavenhagen's "exceedingly beautiful sounding and musically confident soprano" on 22 October 1900 and the Münchner Neueste Nachrichten of 23 October 1900 noted how "her bright, sympathetic soprano literally hovered above the choir's harmonies, which were sung in extreme calm".

From 1900 onwards, numerous song recitals found great resonance in the public, which was organised by the Stavenhagen couple. Their Lieder- und Duettenabende were popular, in which Agnes performed with the contralto Iduna Walter-Choinanus and pianist Hermann Zilcher, among others. The Stavenhagen couple were friends with Heinrich VII, Prince Reuss of Köstritz and his wife, the Weimar Princess Marie Alexandrine of Saxe-Weimar-Eisenach, who generously supported their art.

=== End of career and later years ===
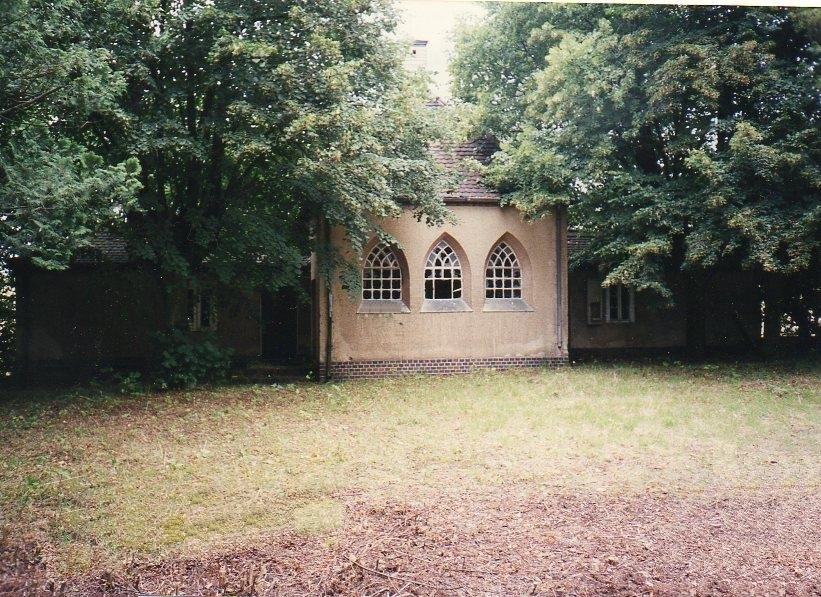
Cemetery chapel on the levelled Heimfriedhof on Salzenforster Straße in Bautzen-Seidau before demolition in 2000

On 1 March 1908, Stavenhagen probably appeared last on stage at the Hoftheater Kassel, as Elsa. The same year saw the divorce of the childless marriage with Bernhard Stavenhagen. In 1911, she moved to Wilmersdorf where she worked as a voice teacher. During this time, she cultivated a friendship with the piano manufacturer Edwin Bechstein and his wife Helene and had access to their salon, a meeting place for artists, industrialists and politicians of the Berlin society. She also made closer acquaintance with members of the Wagner family from Bayreuth and with leading Nazis.

=== Last years and death ===
The last three years of her life were marked by World War II. Because of the continued bombing of Berlin, she was forcibly evacuated to Jagniątków in Silesia in August 1943. At the beginning of 1944, she found a place to stay in Kirschau in Oberlausitz at the request of her niece Eva Maria Ludwig. During the last days of the war, she had to flee from the approaching front, partly on foot, to Bad Schandau. Back in Kirschau, she suffered a severe stroke in the summer of 1945 and was subsequently placed in a diaconal nursing home in Bautzen, where she died on 30 September 1945 at the age of 85. She was buried in the home's cemetery on Salzenforster Straße in Bautzen-Seidau.
