= Friedhof II der Sophiengemeinde Berlin =

Cemetery in Berlin, Germany

Coordinates: 52°32′02″N 13°23′30″E

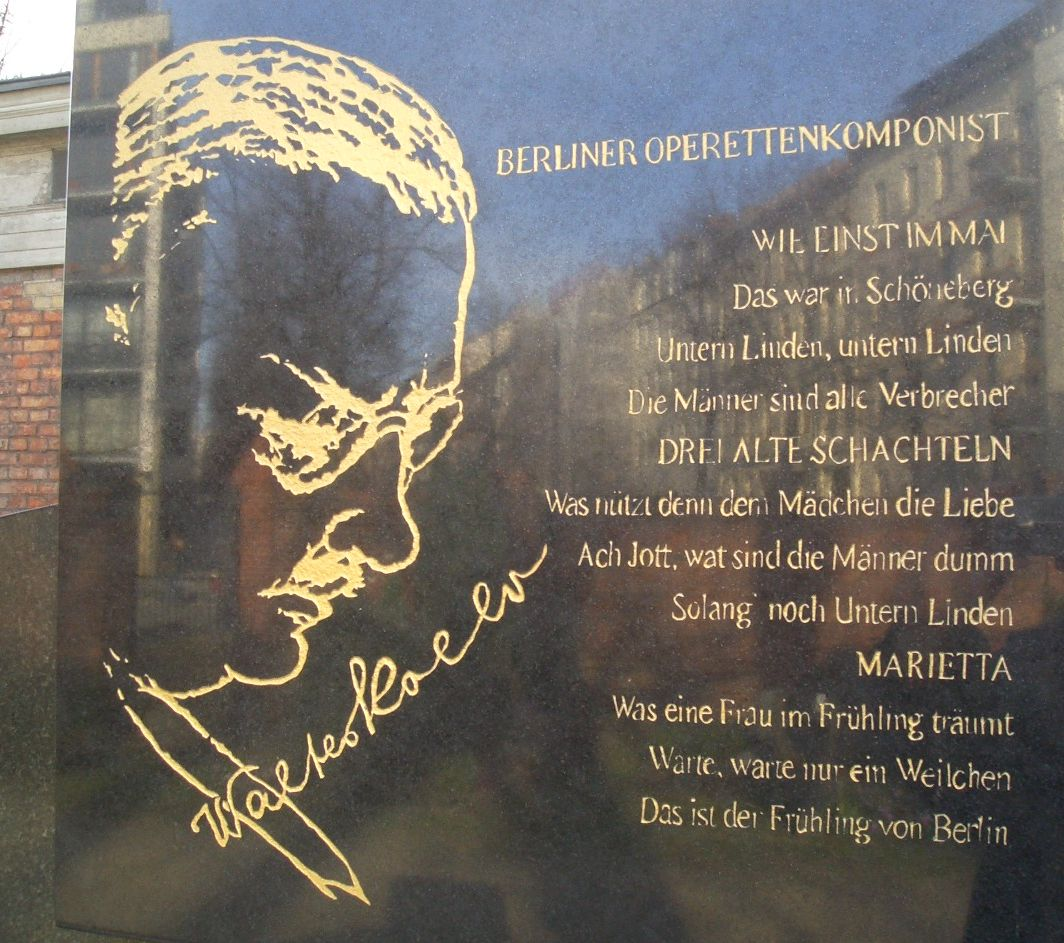
Walter Kollo (with his best-known lieder)

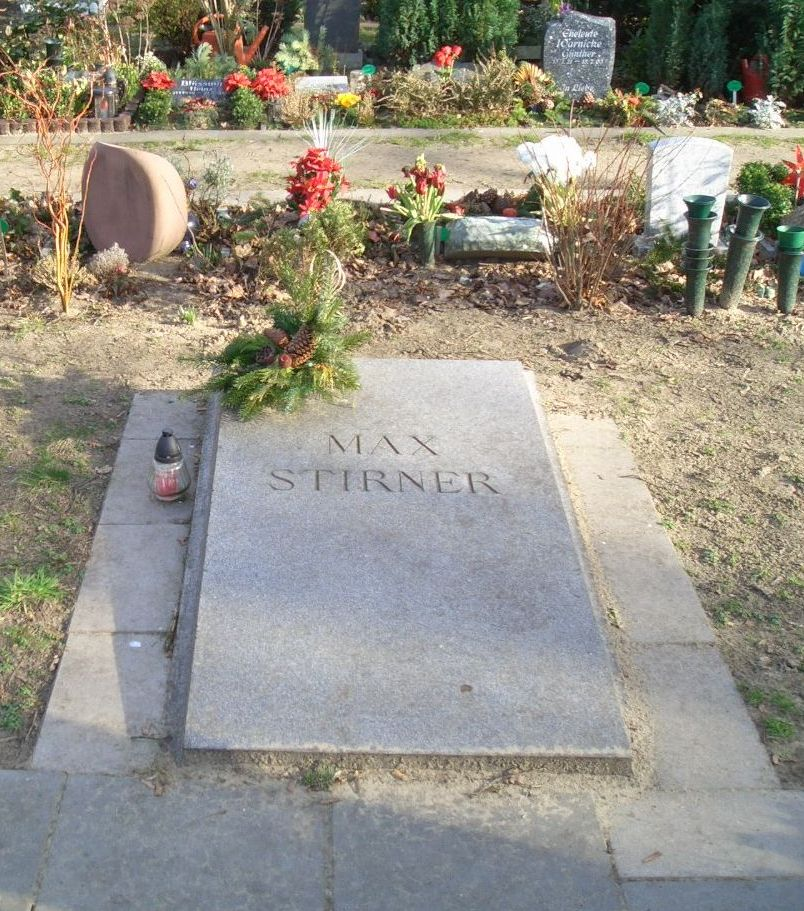
Max Stirner

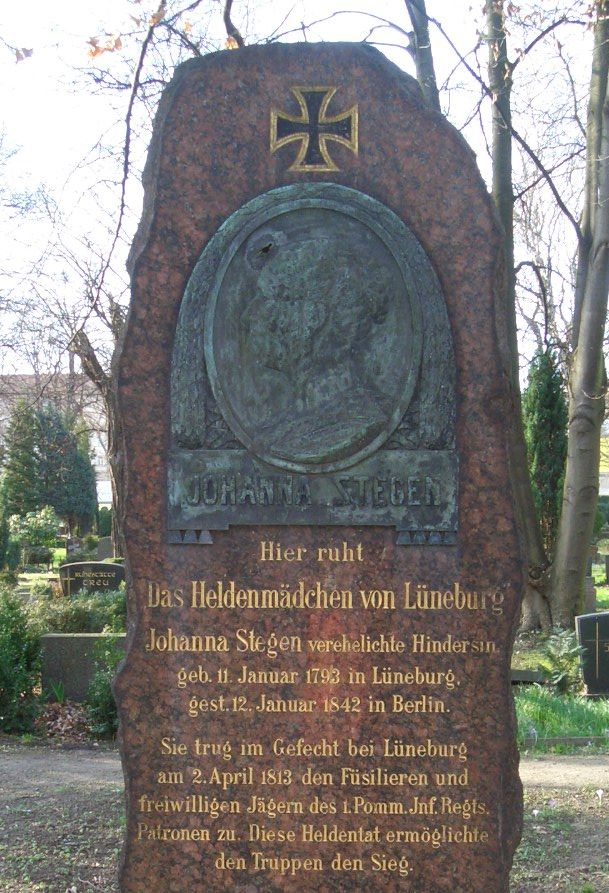
Johanna Stegen

The Friedhof II der Sophiengemeinde Berlin is a Protestant cemetery of the Sophienkirche in Berlin-Mitte, Germany.

== Notable interments ==
(*) = An Ehrengrab awarded by the "Landes Berlin"

- Adam Weishaupt, German philosopher, professor of civil law and later canon law, and founder of the Illuminati.
- Wilhelm Friedrich Ernst Bach* (1759–1845), composer, final grandson of Johann Sebastian Bach, Grablage: IX-5-45/46.
- Carl Bechstein* (1826–1900), pianomaker and founder of the famous piano factory, Grablage: IX-1
- Edwin Bechstein (1859–1934), pianomaker and son of Carl, grave levelled
- James Hobrecht (1825–1902), city-planner, author of the Hobrecht-Plan on sanitation, Grablage: I-V-14/16 (grave probably levelled)
- Theodor Hosemann* (1807–1875), genre painter, illustrator and caricaturist, Grablage: VIII-25-35.
- Walter Kollo* (1878–1940), composer of 30 operettas including Drei alte Schachteln, Grablage: IX-1-40+41
- Albert Lortzing* (1801–1851), opera composer (Zar und Zimmermann, Der Wildschütz), Grablage: IX-6-46+47.
- Caroline Medon (1802–1882), actress then opera singer
- Constantin Starck († 1939), sculptor, grave probably levelled
- Johanna Stegen* verehelicht Hindersin (1793–1842), "the heroine of Lüneburg", medallion by Albert Moritz Wolff, Grablage: VIII-5-23+24.
- Max Stirner*, actually Johann Caspar Schmidt (1806–1856), philosopher and author: The Ego and Its Own, Grablage: V-8-53.
- Hermann Friedrich Waesemann* (1813–1879), architect, designer of the Berliner Rathaus (the so-called "Rotes Rathaus"), Medaillon by Otto Geyer, Grablage: III-1-18+19.
- Adolf Zander (1843–1914), royal music-director, Grablage: X-26-22
