= Johanna Stegen =

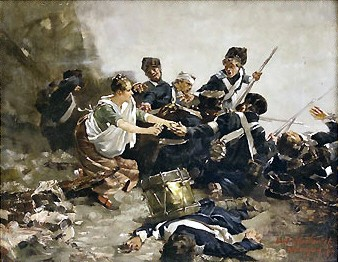
Ludwig Herterich: Johanna Stegen, the Heroine of Lüneburg, history painting of 1887

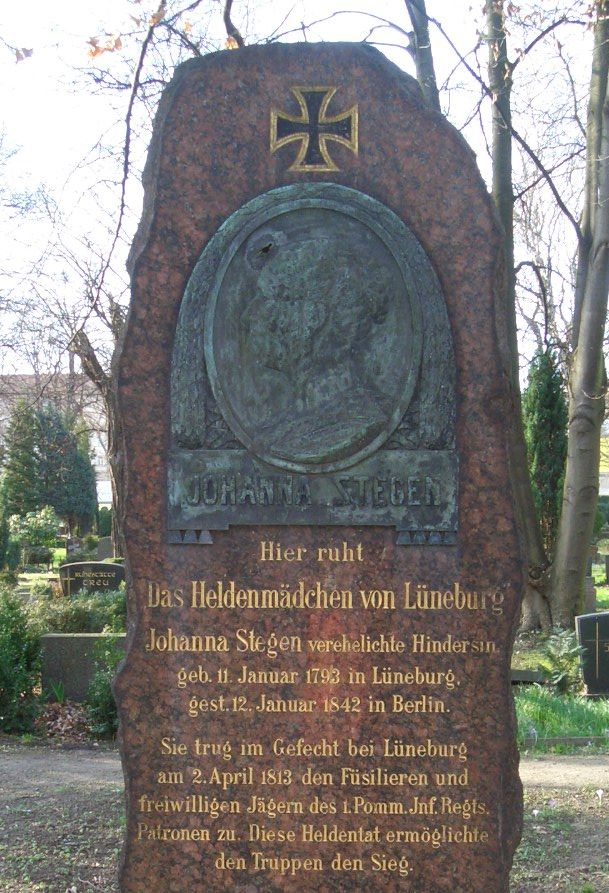
Her gravestone at the Friedhof II der Sophiengemeinde Berlin, with a relief by Albert Moritz Wolff

Johanna Stegen (11 January 1793, Lüneburg - 12 January 1842, Berlin) was a German woman of the Napoleonic Wars.

On 2 April 1813, German troops (made up of the fusiliers and volunteer Jägers of the 1st Pommerschen infantry regiment) clashed with Napoleonic troops near Lüneburg. In the course of the battle, the Prussian regiment risked running out of ammunition, and so Stegen rushed ammunition to them in her apron, thus significantly contributing to the Prussian victory. She was glorified soon afterwards in the patriotic poems of Friedrich Rückert. In 1817, she married the Prussian corporal Wilhelm Hindersin in Berlin - he had recently become a Royal Masterprinter in the war ministry. In her memory a young woman dresses as her once a year to clean the war monument in Lüneburg and to tell onlookers of her actions, and streets in Lüneburg and Berlin-Steglitz are still named after her.

== Legacy ==
Johanna Langefeld, a Nazi concentration camp guard, was named for her.
