= Caroline Medon =

German dancer, opera singer and stage actress

Caroline Medon (real name: Caroline Wilhelmine Richter; 3 January 1802 – 6 June 1882) was a German opera singer and stage actress who became known as a lover of Arthur Schopenhauer.

== Life ==
Caroline Richter was born in Frankfurt in 1802. She came to Berlin around 1819 as a chorister at the Staatsoper Unter den Linden. It was there that she met Arthur Schopenhauer, probably in 1820 or spring 1821, when he lectured in Berlin. The abrupt and fading relationship between the two lasted about ten years. The "eternal bachelor" Schopenhauer, however, mistrusted her possible motives, which together with worries about her health and jealousy of other lovers of the singer was the reason why an engagement or marriage never came about.

Around 1820, Caroline Richter took the name of the secret secretary Louis Medon who was the presumed father of her first child, Johann Wilhelm Adolf Medon, but he died early. She later stated to be Medon's widow. Her second son, the later royal dancer Gustav Medon (1823–1905) was strongly rejected by Schopenhauer, since he had been born on 27 March 1823, ten months after Schopenhauer's departure for Italy, from which he returned to Berlin only in 1825. A third pregnancy in 1826, for which she even ended her engagement at the Berlin Opera, led to a miscarriage. When Schopenhauer fled from cholera in 1831, Medon refused to leave behind her almost nine-year-old son Carl; This led to the final break in the relationship, despite her letters in the following years to him, in which she said she was healthy. She finally entered the stage, now as a singer at the Königsstädtisches Theater.

In 1858, she again made a written contact with Schopenhauer, who therefore considered her in his will in February 1859. He left her the sum of 5000 Prussian thalers, a considerable portion of his fortune, on the condition that his legacy should not fall explicitly to Carl or other heirs of Medon.

She is also the author of a hand-knitted "rose carpet", which Schopenhauer's estate administrator long regarded as a gift from Schopenhauer's sister.

Caroline Medon died in Berlin on 6 June 1882. She was buried at Evangelischen Sophien-Friedhof II in Berlin on 8 June 1892.

== Sources ==
- Robert Gruber: Schopenhauers Geliebte in Berlin (Caroline Richter-Medon (c. 1830)) in Berlin. Urkundliches. Vienna, 1934.
