= Bernhard Stavenhagen =

German pianist, composer and conductor (1862–1914)

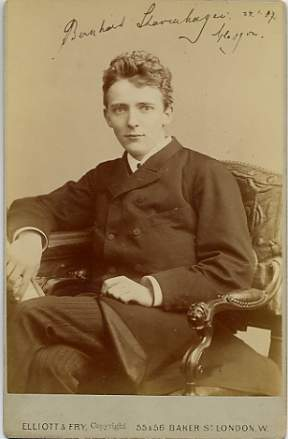
- Stavenhagen before 1907 by Elliott & Fry
- Born: 24 November 1862; Greiz
- Died: 25 December 1914 (aged 52); Geneva, Switzerland
- Occupations: Pianist; Composer; Conductor

Bernhard Stavenhagen (24 November 1862 – 25 December 1914) was a German pianist, composer and conductor. His musical style was influenced by Franz Liszt, and as a conductor he was a strong advocate of new music.

== Biography ==
Born in Greiz, he commenced piano study in 1868. His family moved to Berlin in 1874 where he began studying with Theodor Kullak. He entered university there in 1878, privately studying composition with Friedrich Kiel.

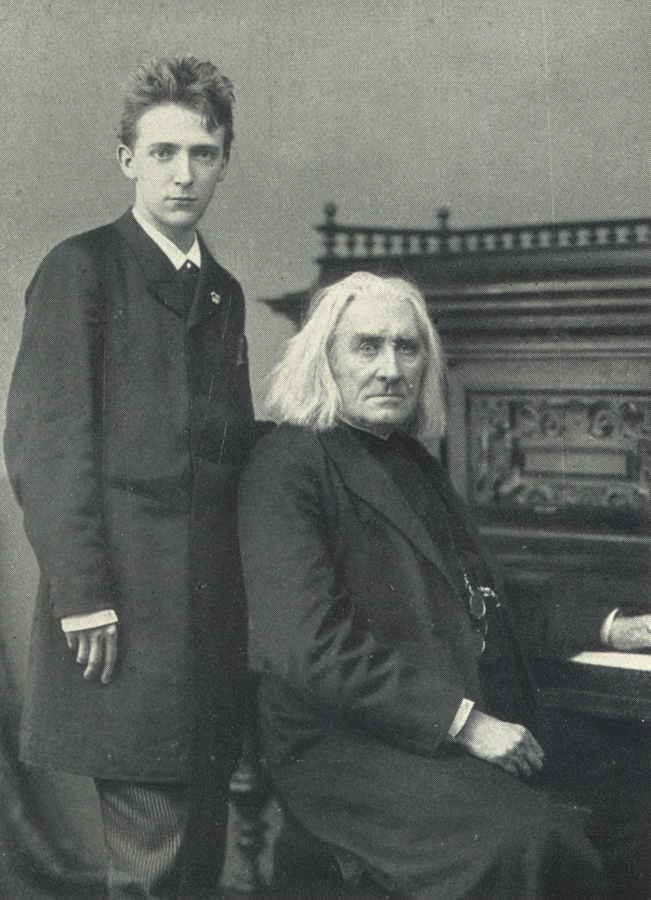
Stavenhagen with Liszt in 1885

In 1885 Stavenhagen became a pupil of Franz Liszt in Weimar, travelling with him to Rome, Budapest, Paris, London and Bayreuth. After Liszt's death in 1886, Stavenhagen embarked on a ten-year series of piano concert tours in Europe and to North America. In April 1890 he was appointed court pianist to the Grand Duke of Saxe-Weimar and the following July he married Agnes Denninghoff (better known as Agnes Denis-Stavenhagen, 1860-1945), a soprano with the Weimar Court Opera. In 1893 he composed his Third Piano Concerto in B minor.

He fulfilled conducting appointments in Weimar, where he was appointed court Kapellmeister and conducted Weimar premieres of six new operas in eighteen months, and from 1898 a similar appointment in Munich. Then in 1907 he moved to Geneva, taking over the piano master classes at the conservatoire there until his death in 1914. In subscription concerts he conducted premieres of works by composers ranging from Richard Strauss, Hans Pfitzner and Gustav Mahler to Arnold Schoenberg, Claude Debussy and Maurice Ravel.

After his death his body was transferred to Weimar where he was buried.

Among his piano roll recordings is a performance of Liszt's Hungarian Rhapsody No. 12; he annotated this recording to suggest that it was how he had heard Liszt play it.

He is commemorated by the music school Bernhard Stavenhagen in Greiz.
