= Hermann Friedrich Waesemann =

German architect

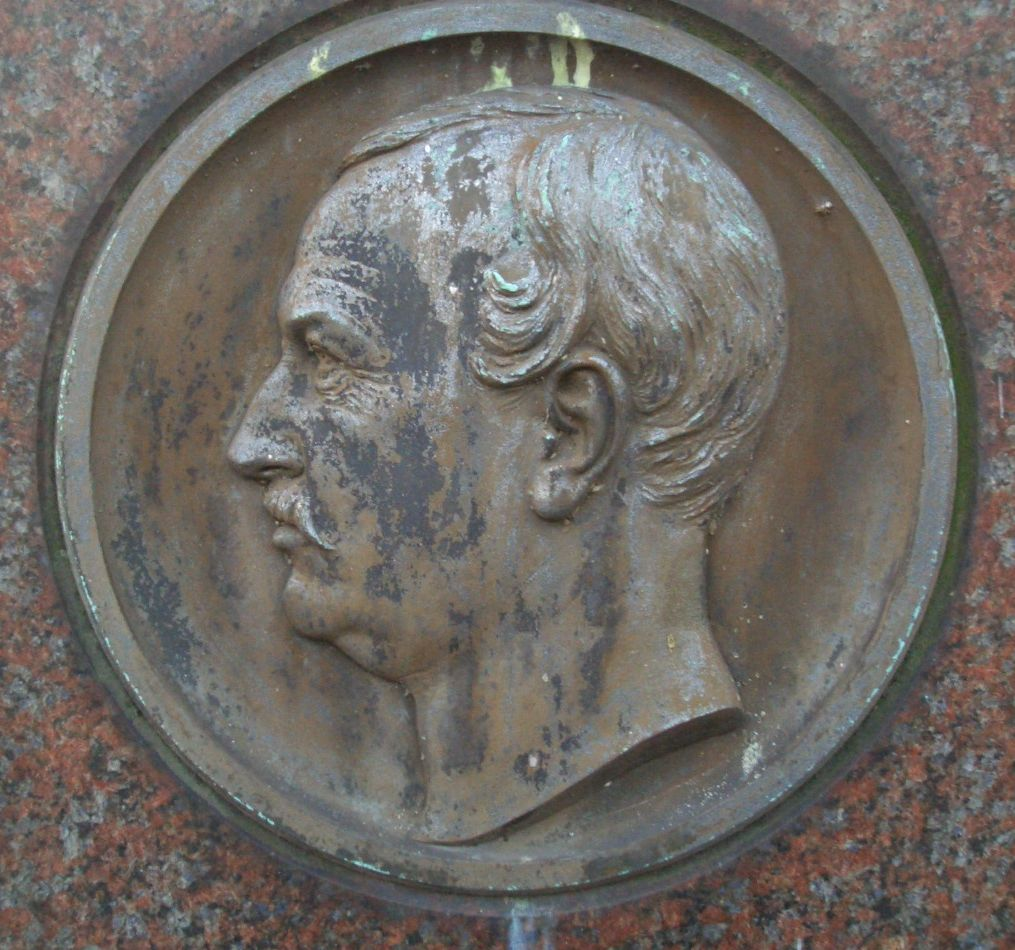
Medaillion on his grave stone

Hermann Friedrich Waesemann (6 June 1813 – 28 January 1879) was a German architect.

He was born in Danzig (Gdańsk), the son of an architect. He studied mathematics and science in Bonn from 1830 to 1832, before going to Berlin to study architecture at the Bauakademie, living at Zimmerstraße 30. His main work is the Rotes Rathaus in Berlin.

Waesemann died in Berlin and is buried at the Friedhof II der Sophiengemeinde Berlin.

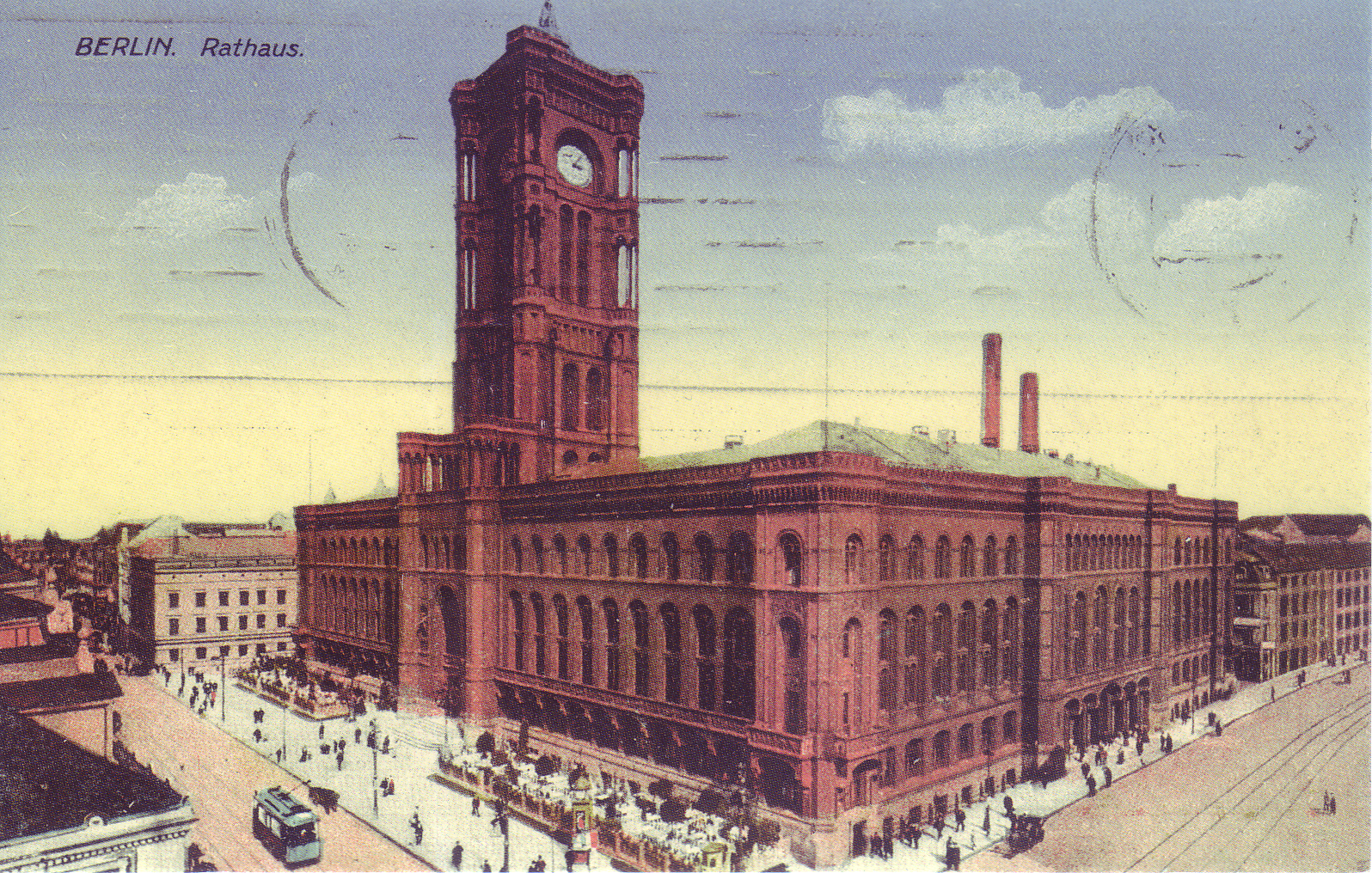
The Rotes Rathaus in Berlin
