= Carl Bechstein =

German piano maker

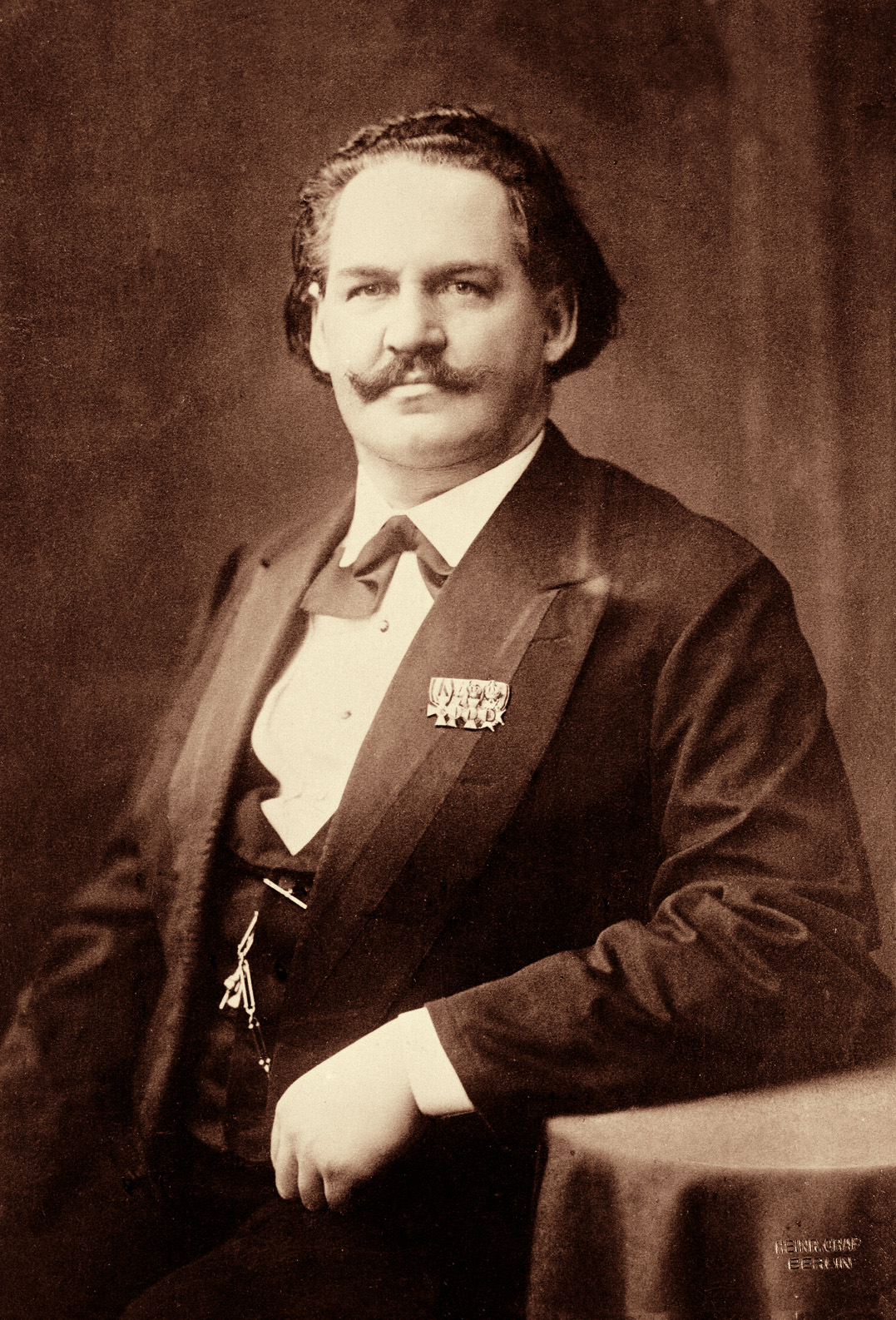
- Born: 1 June 1826; Gotha, Saxe-Gotha-Altenburg, German Confederation
- Died: 6 March 1900 (aged 73); Berlin, Province of Brandenburg, Kingdom of Prussia, German Empire
- Occupation: Piano manufacturer
- Known for: Maker of C. Bechstein pianos and founder of C. Bechstein Pianofortefabrik.
- Children: Alfred Edwin (1859–1934); Carl Friedrich Wilhelm (1860–1931); Johannes "Hans" Max (1863–1905)

Friedrich Wilhelm Carl Bechstein (German pronunciation: [ˈfʁiːdʁɪç ˈvɪlhɛlm ˈkaʁl ˈbɛçʃtaɪn]; 1 June 1826 – 6 March 1900) was a German piano designer. He was the maker of C. Bechstein pianos and the founder of C. Bechstein Pianofortefabrik.

== Biography ==
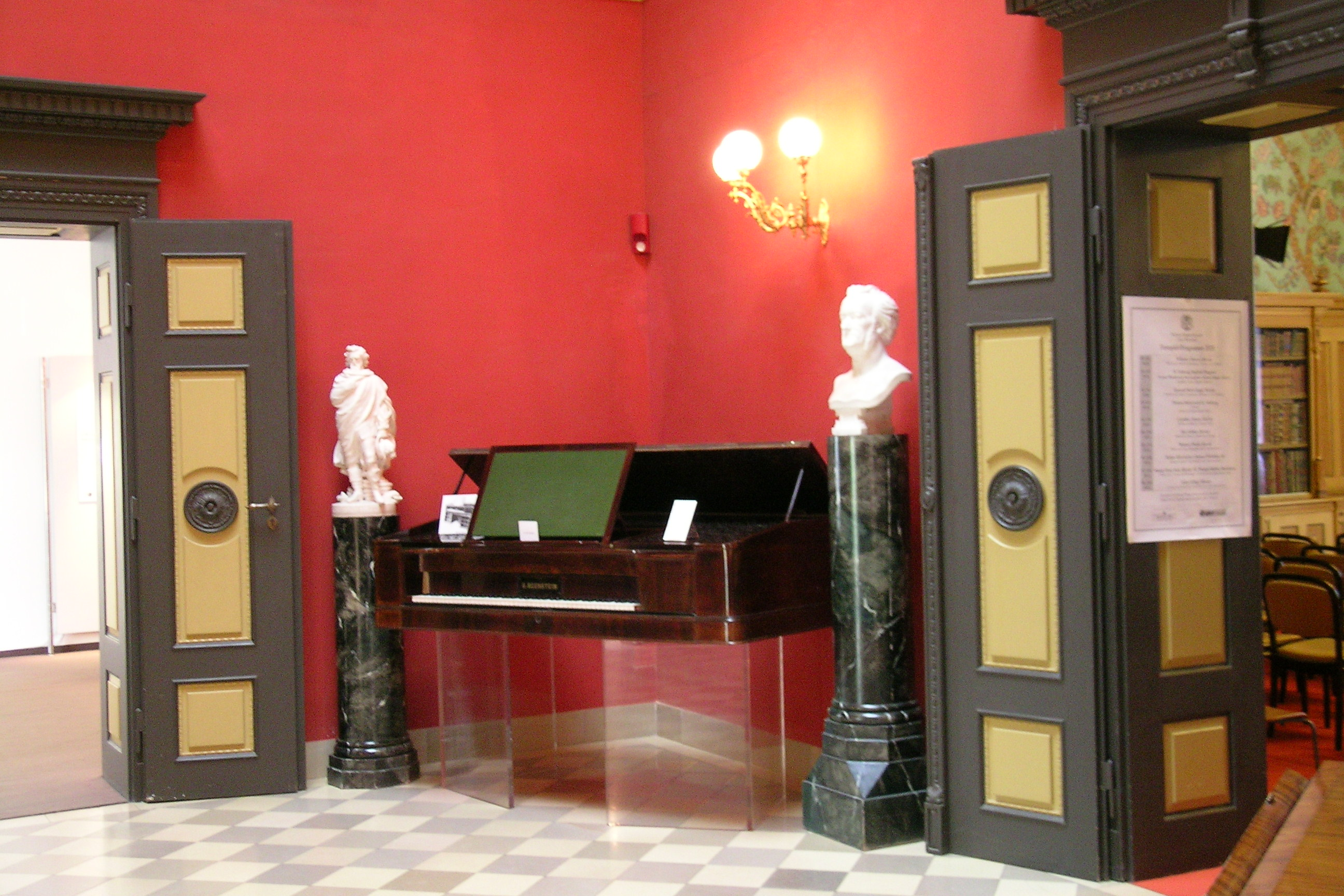
Lobby at Wahnfried, showing the combined "composition piano" and writing desk specially made by Bechstein for Richard Wagner, with a large music stand and space for papers.

Carl Bechstein was born on 1 June 1826 in Gotha, in Saxe-Gotha-Altenburg (now Thuringia). He studied and worked in France and England as a piano craftsman, before he became an individual piano maker. His first pianos were made for other companies. From 1844 to 1848 he worked in Dresden for a local piano maker, then moved to Berlin and worked at Klavierfabrik Perau in Behrenstraße 56. In 1849 he worked as a hired contractor for piano makers in Paris. Back in Berlin he worked again for Klavierfabrik Perau in 1852-53.

=== C. Bechstein piano factory ===
The C. Bechstein piano factory was founded on 1 October 1853 by Carl Bechstein in Berlin.

Carl Bechstein set out to manufacture a piano able to withstand the great demands imposed on the instrument by the virtuosi of the time, such as Franz Liszt. In 1857, Hans von Bülow (Liszt's son-in-law) gave the first public performance on a Bechstein grand piano by performing Liszt's Piano Sonata in B minor in Berlin.

By 1870, with the endorsements by Franz Liszt and Hans von Bülow, Bechstein pianos became a staple at many concert halls, as well as in private mansions. By that time three piano makers became established as the industry leaders across the world: Bechstein, Blüthner and Steinway & Sons.

In 1880, the second piano factory was opened in Berlin, and the third factory was opened in 1897 in Berlin Kreuzberg. The years from the 1870s through 1914 brought Bechstein their most dramatic increase in sales.

In 1885, Bechstein first supplied a piano to Queen Victoria. A gilded art-case piano was first delivered to the Buckingham Palace, then several more Bechstein pianos were delivered to Windsor Castle and to other royal residences. By January 1886 they were among the piano manufacturers holding a Royal Warrant as a supplier to the Queen. Many other mansions and salons in London were following the royal example. Several British embassies across the world acquired Bechstein pianos to replace lesser instruments.

Also in 1885, Bechstein opened a branch in London, that eventually grew to become their largest showroom and dealership in Europe, and then, a few years later, opened showrooms in Paris, and in St. Petersburg. In London the company spent £100,000 to build Bechstein Hall. adjacent to its London showroom at 36-40 Wigmore Street. It opened on 31 May 1901. Between 1901 and 1914, C. Bechstein was the largest piano dealership in London.

At that time, Bechstein was the official piano maker for the Tsars of Russia, the royal families of Spain, Belgium, the Netherlands, Italy, Sweden, Norway, Austria and Denmark, and other royalty and aristocracy. The list of royal clients of Bechstein may be found on the soundboard of vintage Bechstein pianos made before the Second World War. The list is part of the original Bechstein trademark logo, it can be seen under the strings in the center of a piano's soundboard.

== Death ==
Carl Bechstein died in Berlin on 6 March 1900 and was buried at the Friedhof II der Sophiengemeinde Berlin. The Bechstein company continued operations under the management of his sons. Between 1900 and 1914, C. Bechstein was one of the leading piano makers in the world with 1100 craftsmen and workers, making five thousand pianos per year.
