= Red Town Hall =

City hall in Berlin, Germany

- Rotes Rathaus
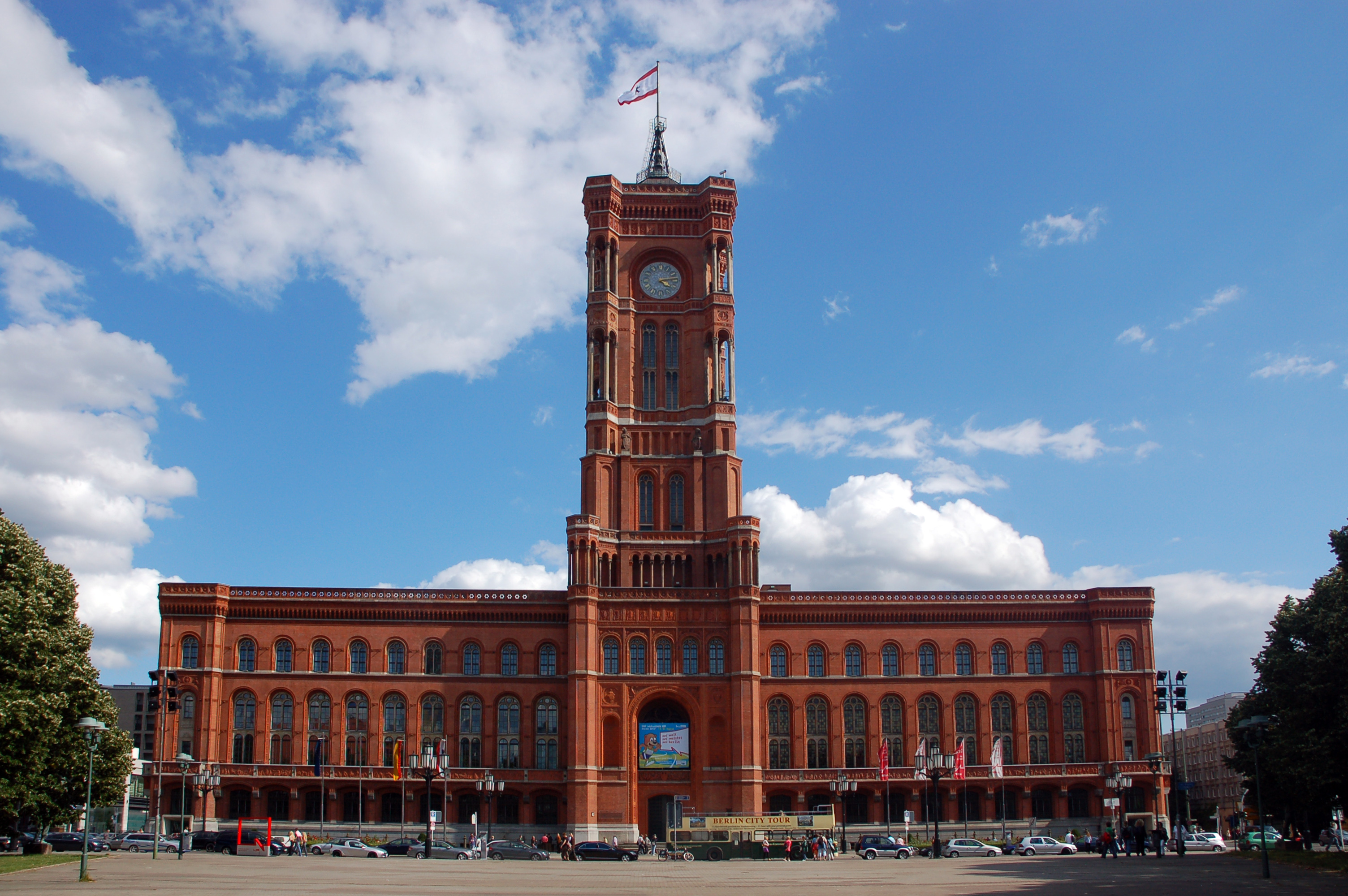
- The main frontage of the town hall in July 2009

General information
- Type: City hall
- Architectural style: Renaissance Revival style
- Location: Berlin, Germany
- Coordinates: 52.5183°N 13.4085°E
- Construction started: 1861
- Completed: 1869

Height
- Height: 94 metres (308 ft)

Design and construction
- Architect: Hermann Friedrich Waesemann

The Red Town Hall (German: Rotes Rathaus German: [ˈʁoːtəs ˈʁaːtˌhaʊs]) is a municipal building in Berlin, in eastern Germany, standing on Rathausstraße, near Alexanderplatz. It accommodates the office of the Governing Mayor of Berlin and the Senate of Berlin.

== History ==
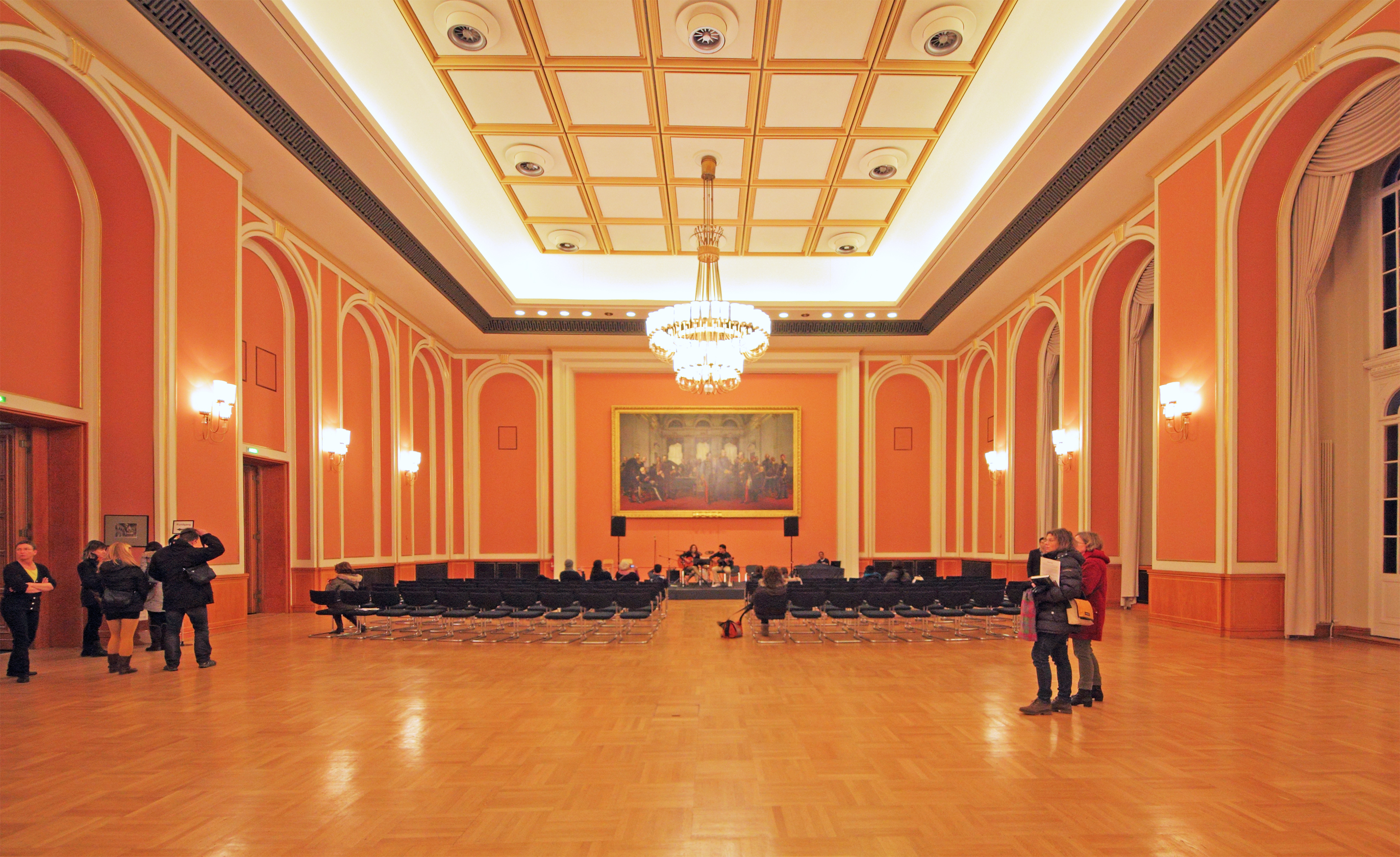
The interior

The first town hall in Berlin was a medieval structure in the Molkenmarkt. It was replaced by a second town hall on the corner of Spandauer Straße and Königstraße (now Rathausstraße) in around 1270. It was rebuilt following fires in 1380, 1484, and 1581. The foundation stone for a third town hall was laid on 23 April 1692. It consisted of a two-storey courtroom with a stepped gable and a clock tower. However, by the mid-19th century it was in a dilapidated condition.

In 1859, the city council led by the mayor, Heinrich Wilhelm Krausnick, decided to commission a new building. The site they selected was immediately behind the old building which was retained until construction was complete. Construction of the new building started in 1860. It was designed by Hermann Friedrich Waesemann in the Renaissance Revival style, built in red clinker bricks and was completed in 1869. The design involved a symmetrical main frontage of 25 bays facing onto Rathausstraße, with the end bays slightly projected forward and the central five bays projected forward to form a five-stage tower. The first stage, which spanned three floors, featured a segmental-headed opening on the ground floor, a round-headed window niche flanked by two empty niches on the first floor, and five mullioned windows on the second floor. The second stage was arcaded with a series of openings supported by columns, the third and fourth stages both incorporated two mullioned windows, and the fifth stage featured a clock. The tower, which was 94 metres (308 ft) high, was surmounted by machicolations and a small spire. The wings were fenestrated by segmental-headed windows on the ground floor and by mullioned windows on the upper floors.

Internally, the principal rooms were the Stadtverordnetensitzungssaal (council chamber), the Speisesaal (dining room), and the Säulensaal (columned hall). Some parts of the facade were decorated with allegorical figures created by the sculptor, Ferdinand August Fischer, while a terracotta frieze depicted events in the history of Berlin and Brandenburg from the 12th century to the founding of the German Empire in 1871.

The building was heavily damaged by the allied bombing of Berlin in the Second World War and rebuilt to the original plans in the early 1950s. A commercial building commissioned in 1930s to accommodate the municipal fire insurance company, Feuersozietät, served as the municipal offices until the Red Town Hall was officially reopened on 30 November 1955. From then, the Red Town hall, located in the Soviet sector, served as the town hall for East Berlin, while the Schöneberg Town Hall served as the town hall for West Berlin.

Following German reunification, the administration of reunified Berlin officially moved into the building on 1 October 1991. In early 2006, the building was renovated and the clock re-gilded.

== Gallery ==
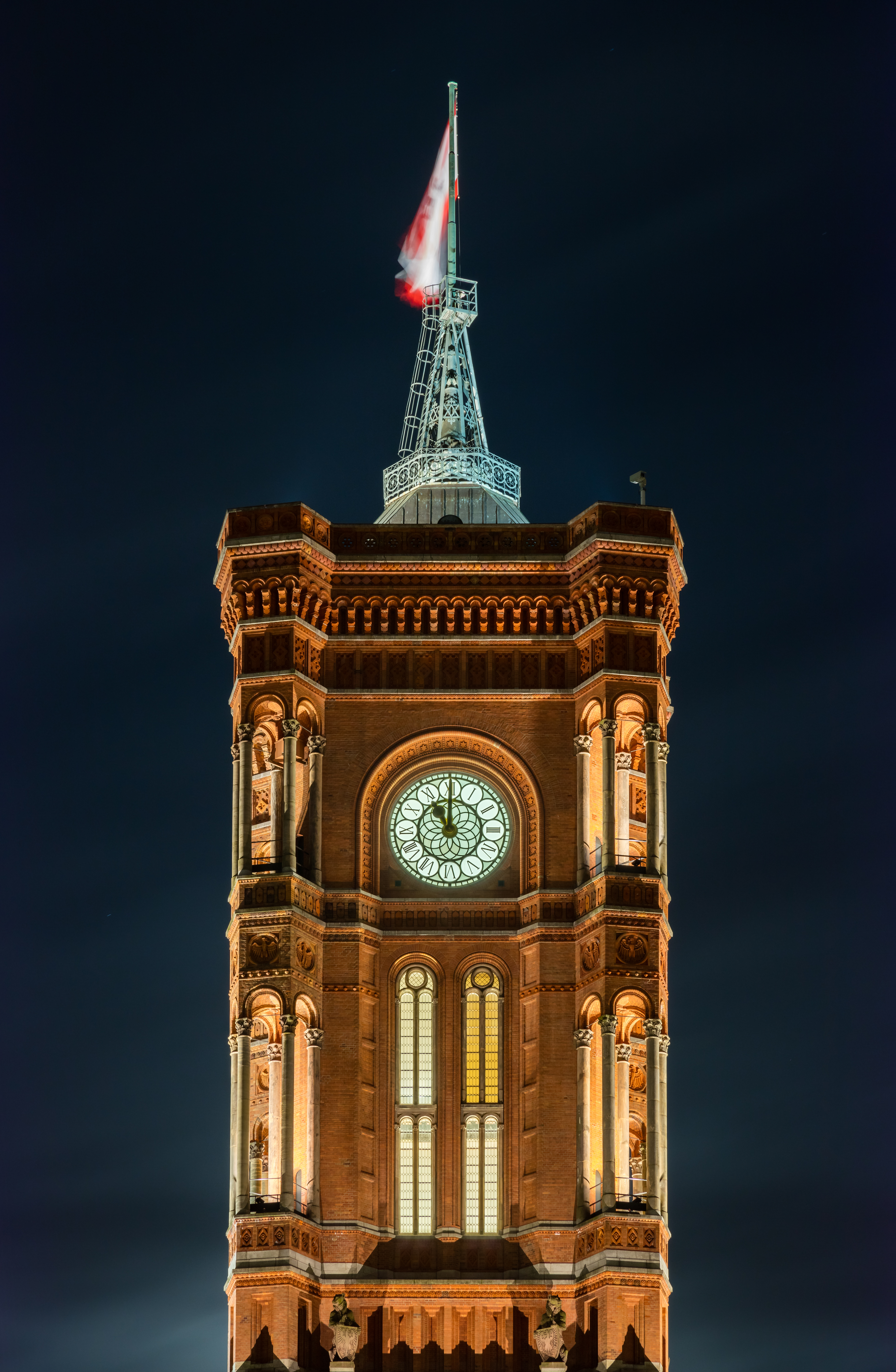
Tower and clock of Red Town Hall

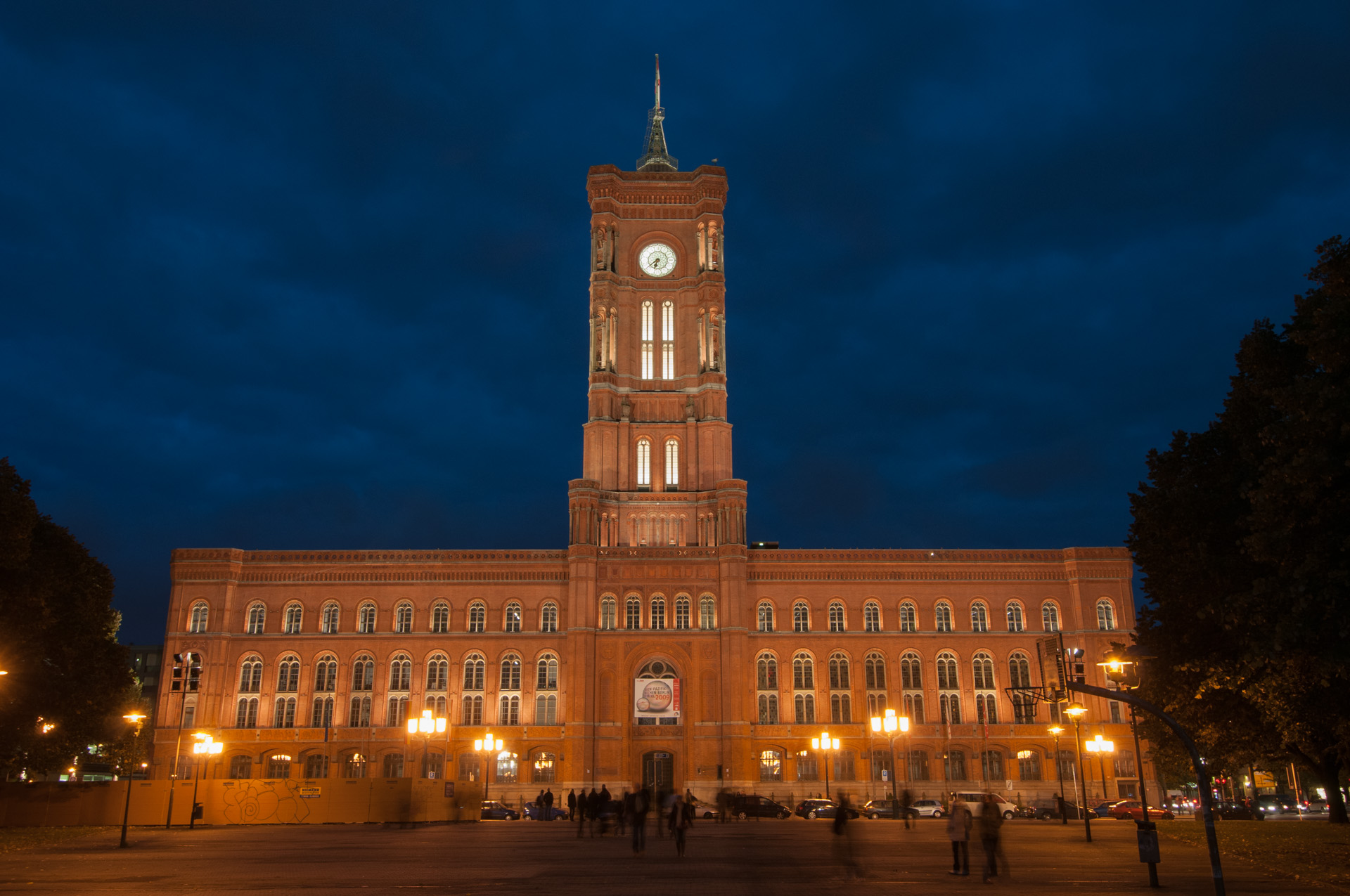
The Red Town Hall at night

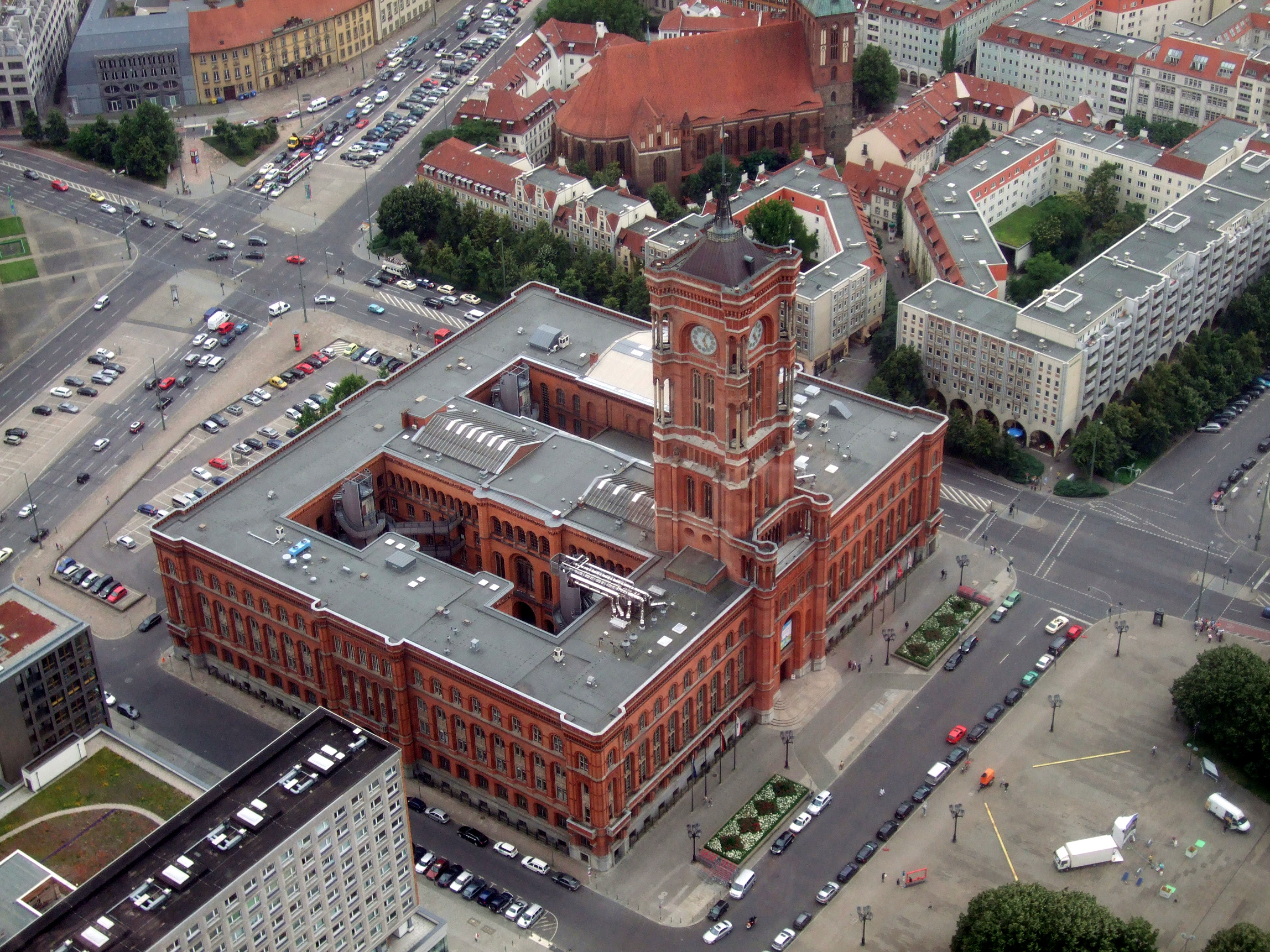
Seen from the Fernsehturm

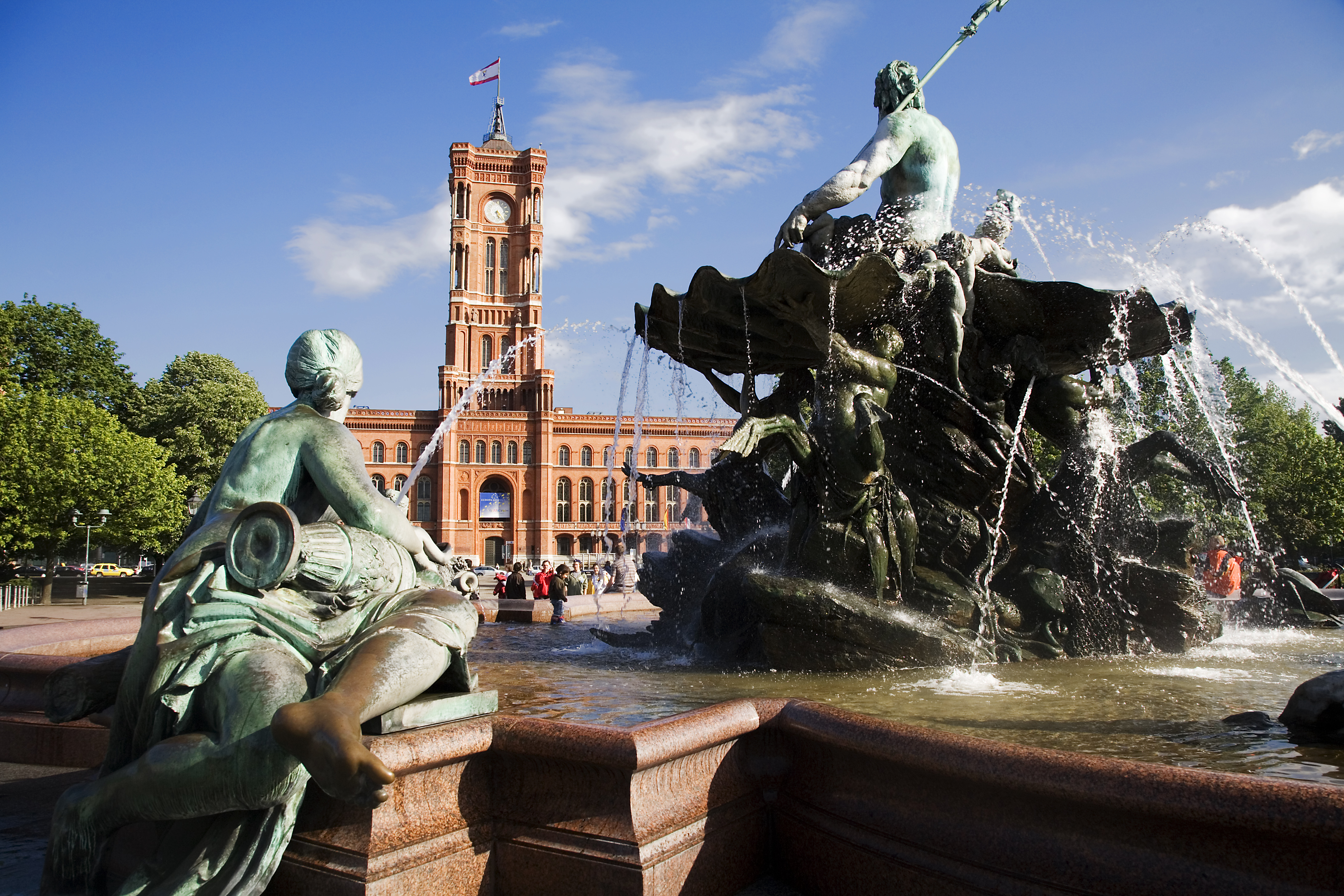
The Red Town Hall and Neptunbrunnen

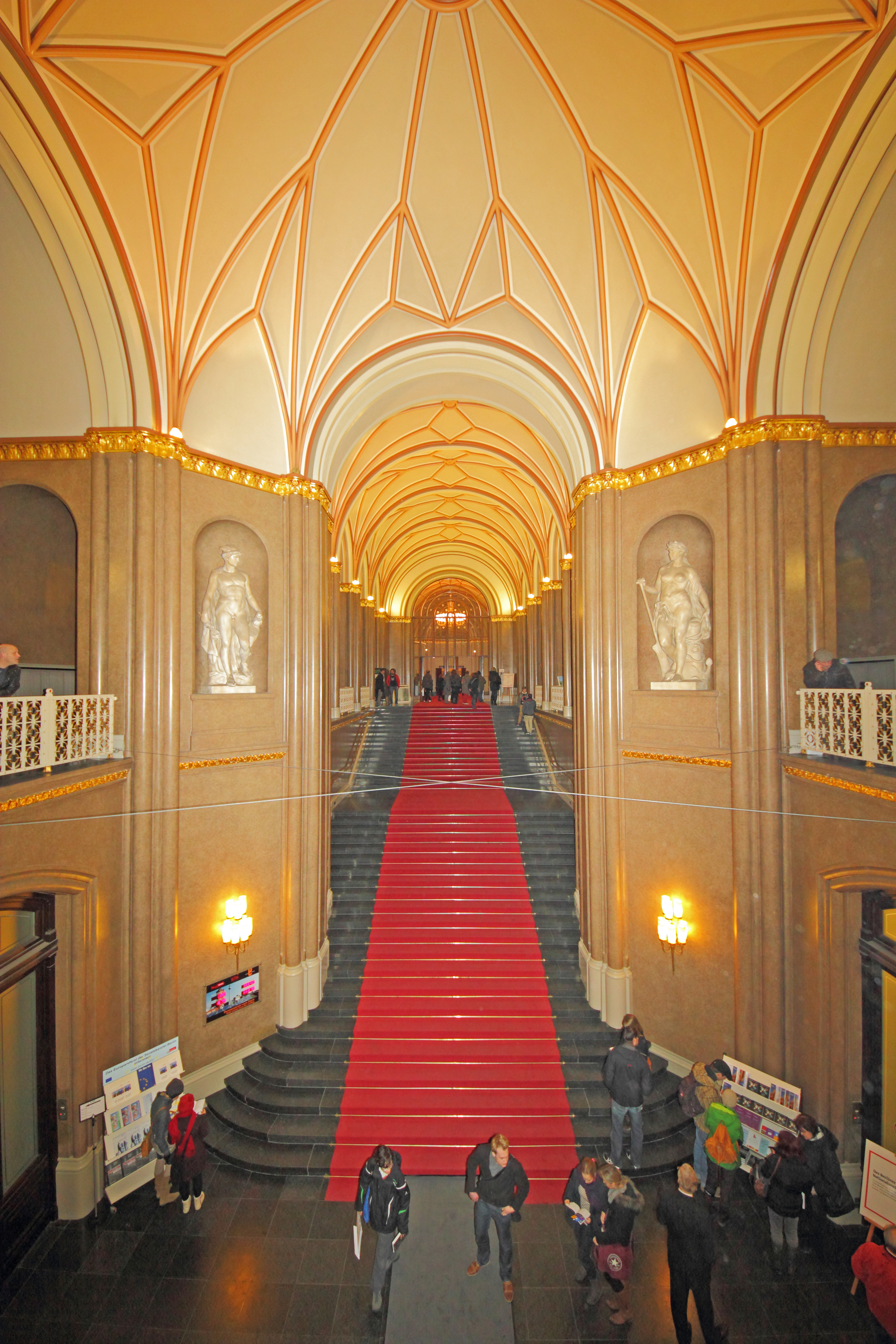
Entrance hall of the Rathaus

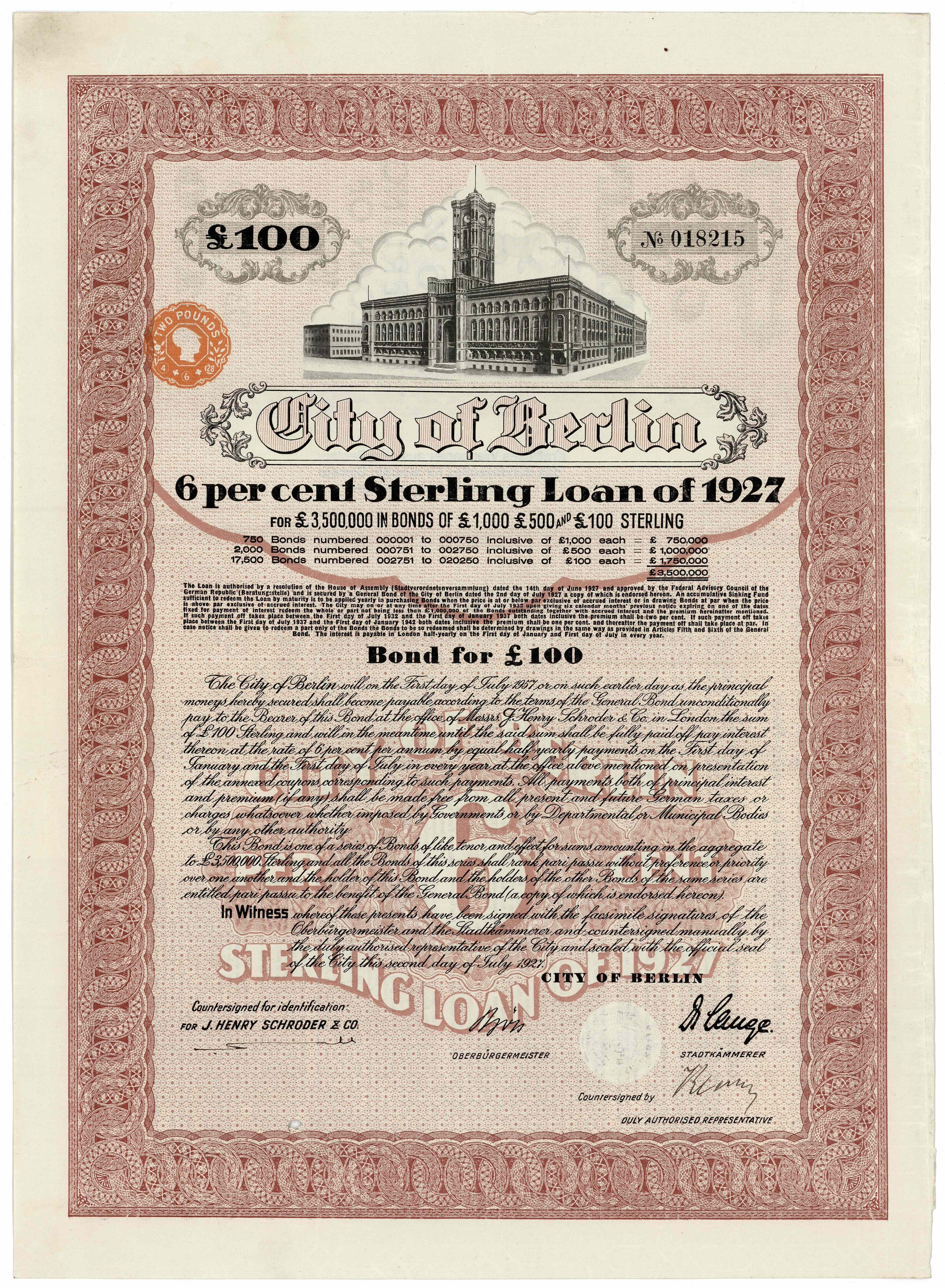
The Red Town Hall on a Sterling loan of the City Berlin, issued 2. July 1927
