= Albert Moritz Wolff =

German sculptor

not to be confused with Albert Wolff (1814–1892).

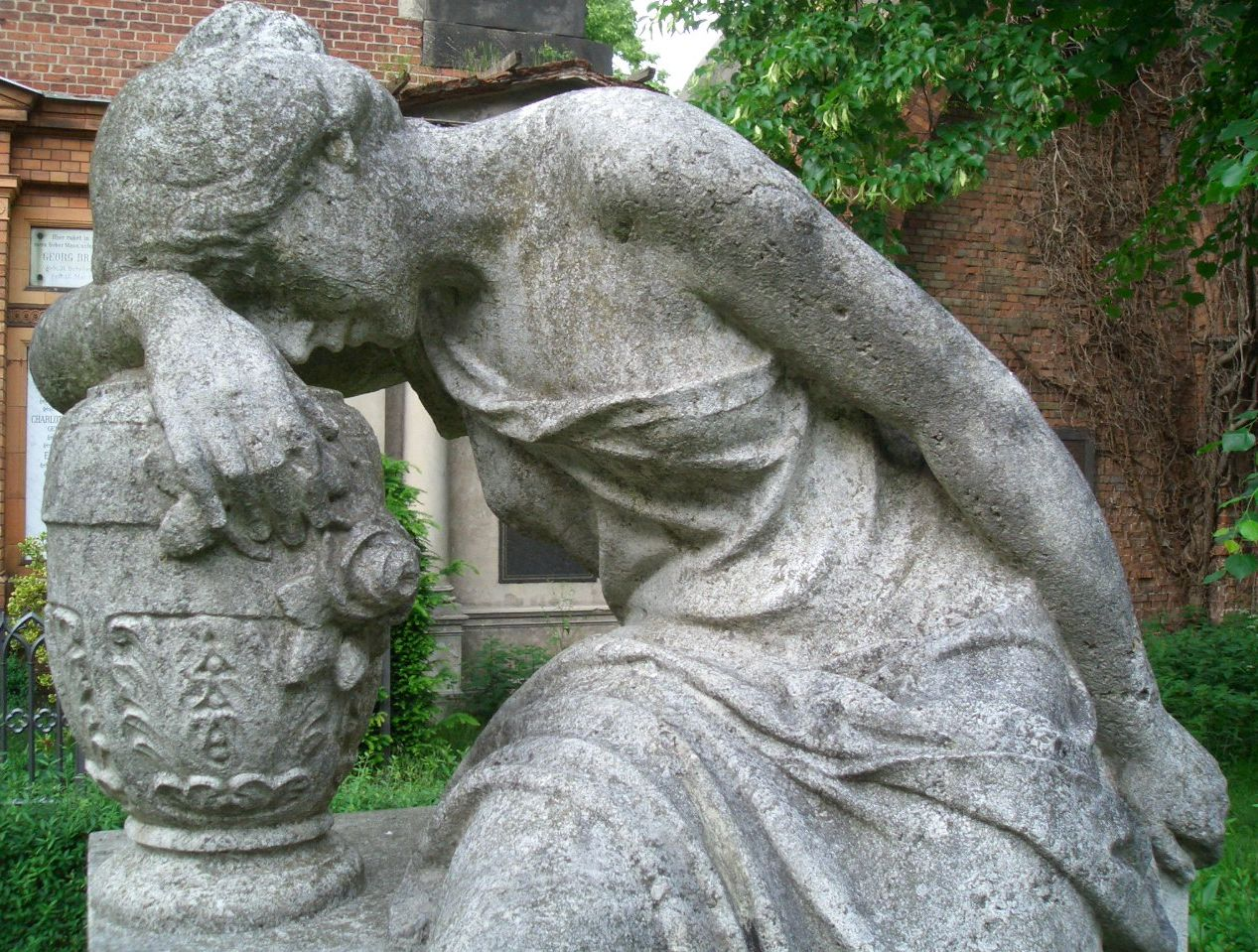
Memorial for Martha Jagielski

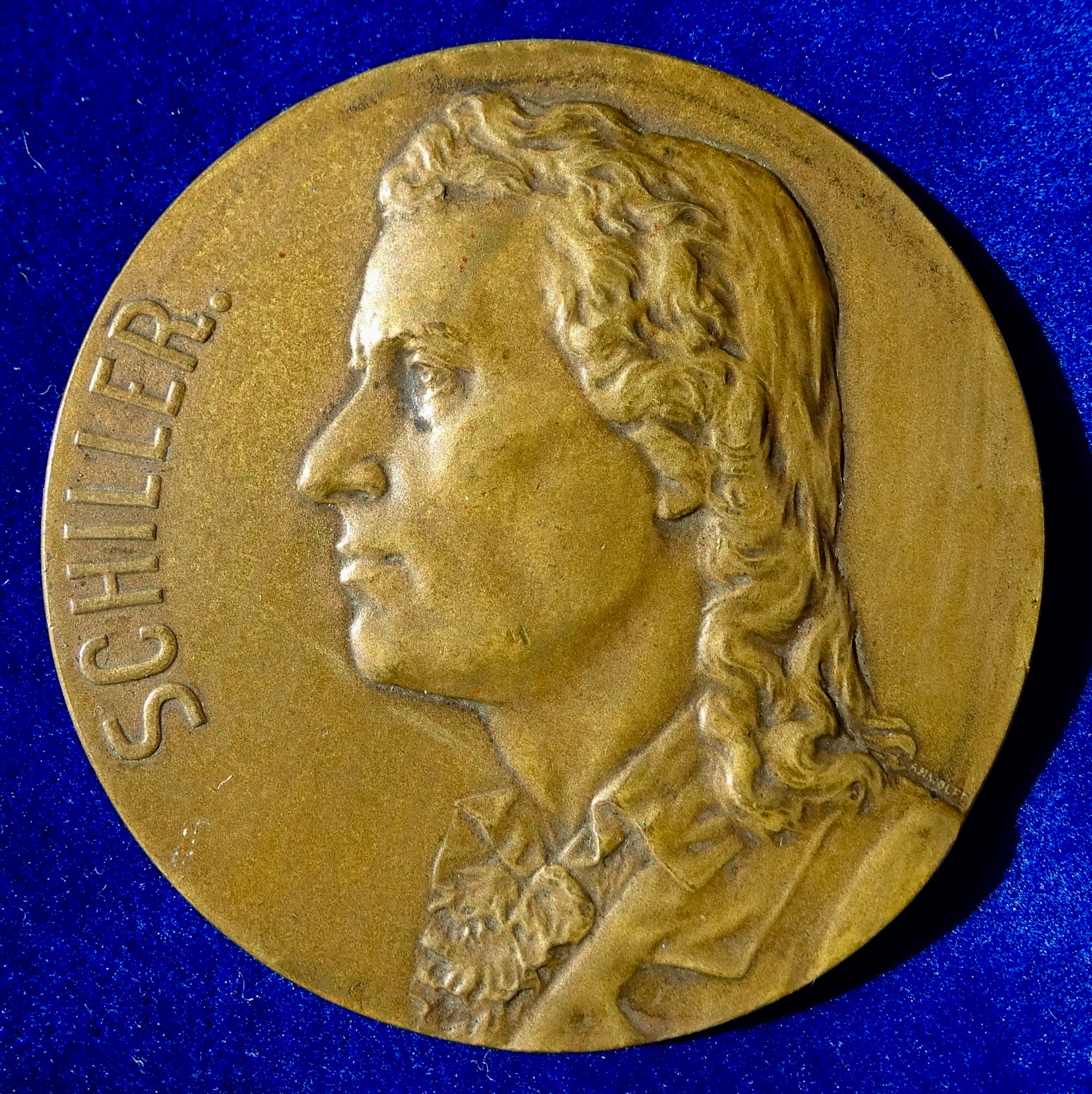
Friedrich Schiller, German Poet and Surgeon 100th Death Anniversary, Art Nouveau medal 1905, obverse.

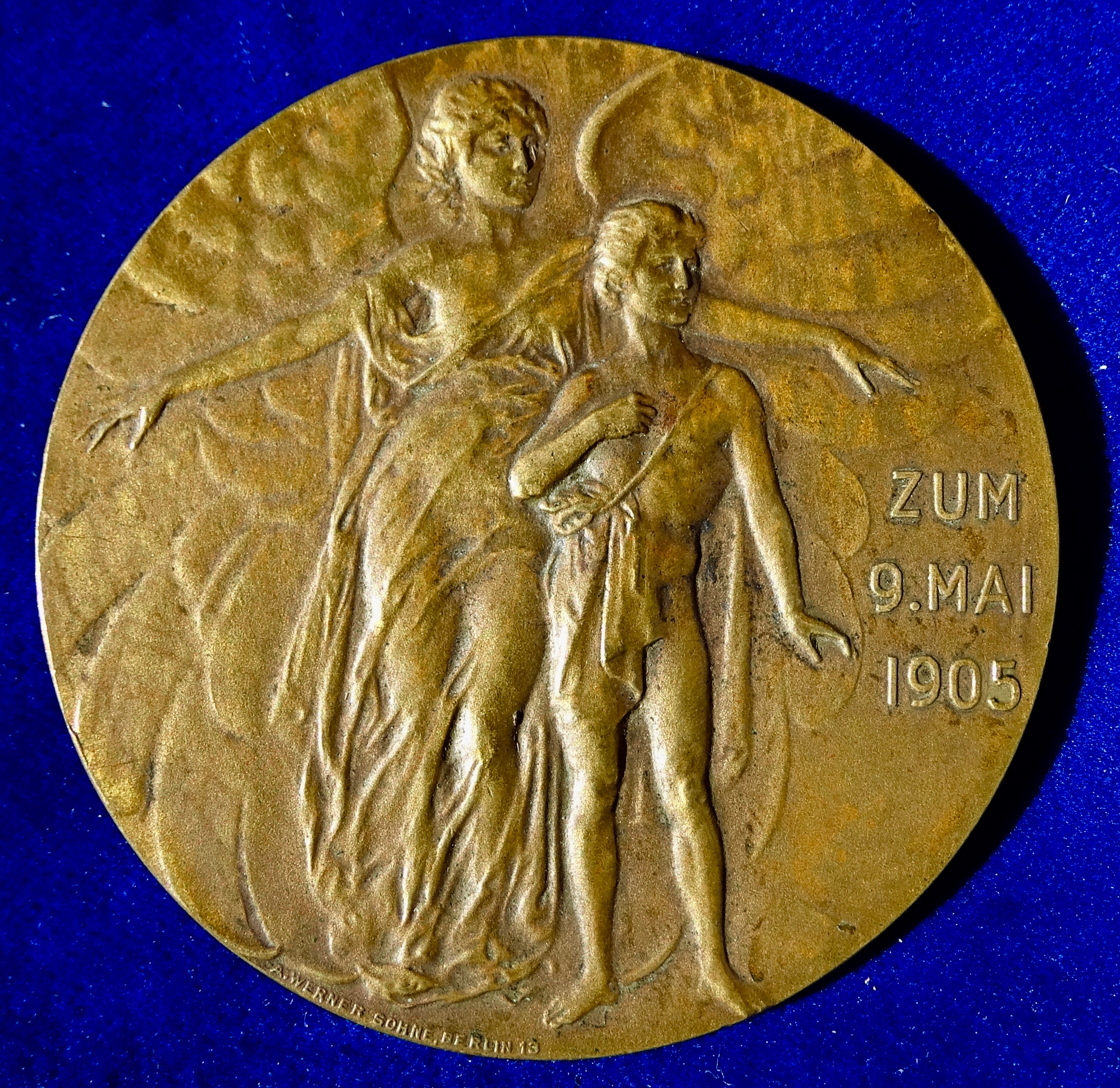
The reverse of this medal after a sculpture of Johann Heinrich von Dannecker.

Albert Moritz Wolff (15 June 1854, Berlin – 23 August 1923, Lüneburg) was a German sculptor and medallion-designer (medallist).
