= C. Bechstein =

German piano manufacturing company

C. Bechstein GmbH

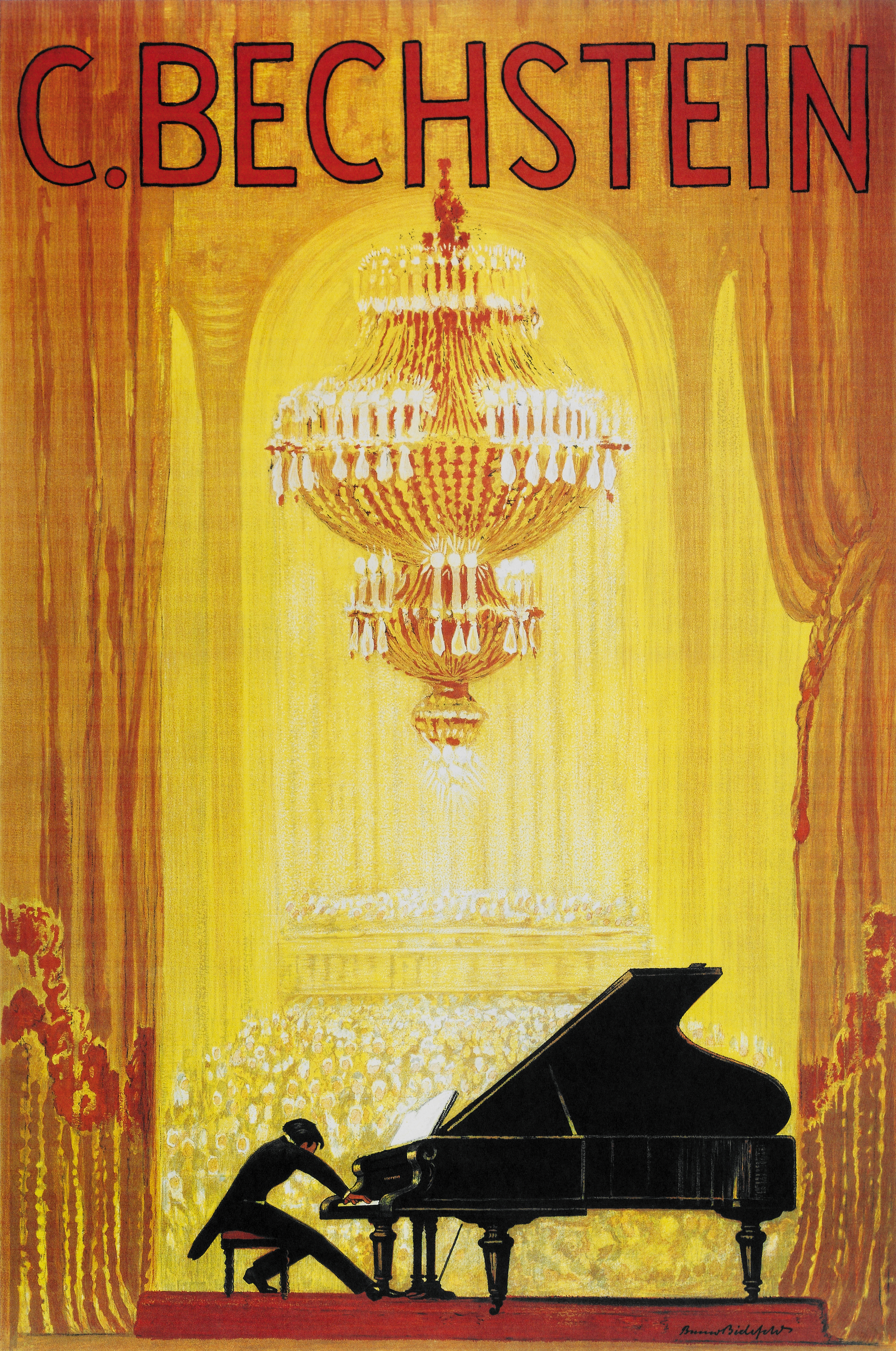
- Advertisement poster from c. 1920
- Type: Aktiengesellschaft
- Industry: Musical instruments
- Founded: 1853
- Founder: Carl Bechstein
- Headquarters: Berlin, Germany
- Key people: Stefan Freymuth (CEO)
- Products: Grand pianos and upright pianos
- Number of employees: c. 360 (Bechstein concern)
- Website: bechstein.com

C. Bechstein GmbH, known simply as Bechstein (German pronunciation: [ˈbɛçʃtaɪn]), is a German piano manufacturer of grand and upright pianos, established in Berlin in 1853 by piano builder Carl Bechstein.

== History ==
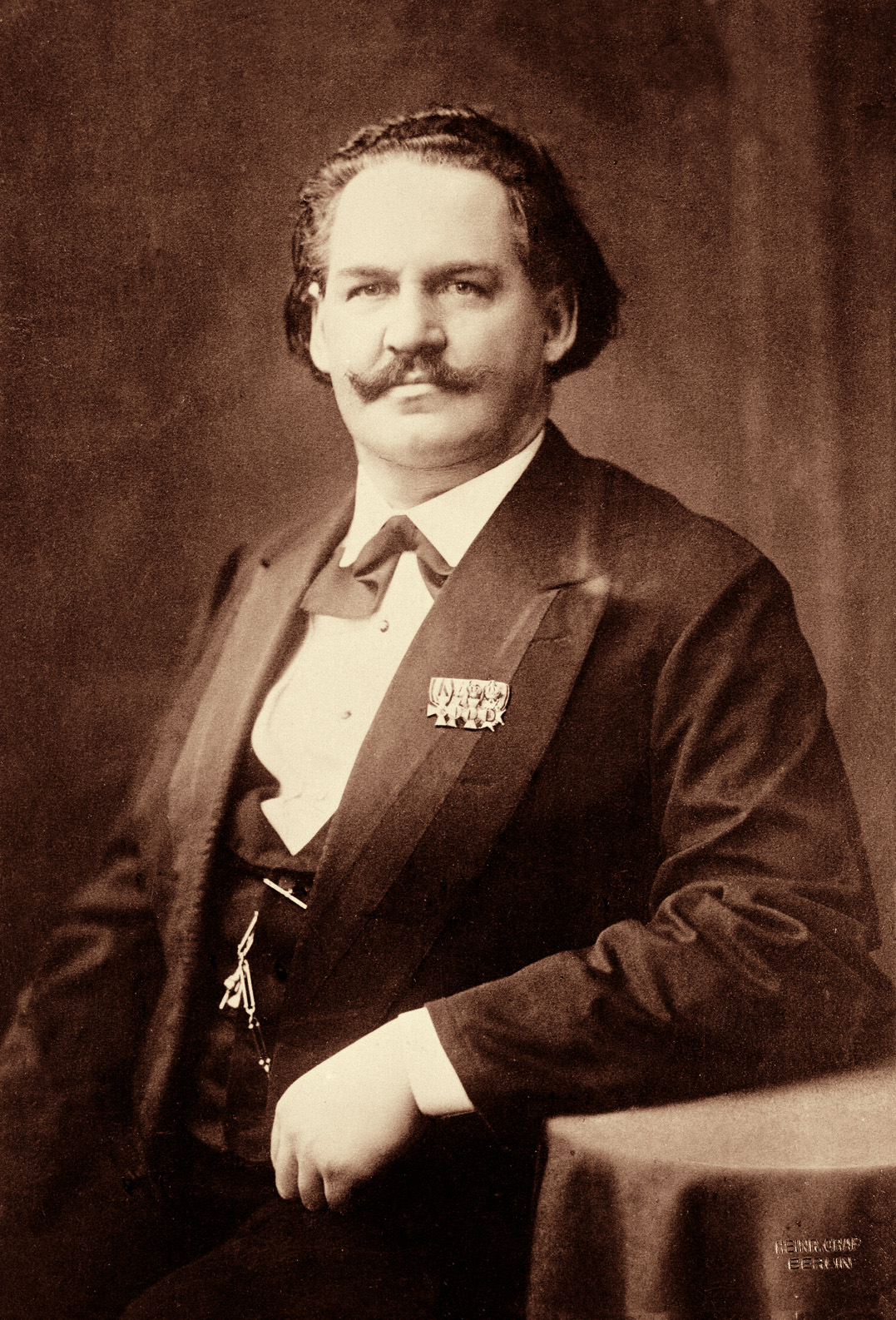
Carl Bechstein

=== Before Bechstein ===
Young Carl Bechstein studied and worked in France and England as a piano craftsman, before he became an independent piano maker. His first pianos were made for other companies.

=== C. Bechstein ===
C. Bechstein piano factory was founded on 1 October 1853 by Carl Bechstein in Berlin, Germany.

Carl Bechstein set out to manufacture a piano able to withstand the great demands imposed on the instrument by the virtuosi of the time, such as Franz Liszt. In 1857, Hans von Bülow (Liszt's son-in-law) gave the first public performance on a Bechstein grand piano by performing Liszt's Piano Sonata in B minor in Berlin.

By 1870, with endorsements from Franz Liszt and Hans von Bülow, Bechstein pianos had become a staple in many concert halls and private mansions. By that time three piano makers, all of which were founded in 1853, became established as the industry leaders across the world: Bechstein, Blüthner and Steinway & Sons.

In 1881, Bechstein began supplying pianos to Queen Victoria. A gilded art-case piano was delivered to Buckingham Palace, followed by several more Bechstein pianos to Windsor Castle and other royal residences. By January 1886 they were among the piano manufacturers holding a royal warrant as a supplier to the Queen. Several British embassies across the world acquired Bechstein pianos.

In 1885, Bechstein opened a branch in London, that eventually grew to become the largest showroom and dealership in Europe. In 1889 he moved to 40 Wigmore Street, taking over the property of H. J. Cave & Sons. By 1890, showrooms opened in Paris, Vienna, and Saint Petersburg. On 31 May 1901, Bechstein Hall, built at a cost of £100,000, opened next to the company's London showroom at 36–40 Wigmore Street. Between 1901 and 1914, C. Bechstein was the largest piano dealership in London. At that time, Bechstein was patronized by the tsars of Russia, the royal families of Spain, Belgium, the Netherlands, Italy, Sweden, Norway, Austria and Denmark, and other royalty and aristocracy. The list of royal clients of Bechstein may be found on the soundboard of vintage Bechstein pianos made before the Second World War. The list is part of the original Bechstein trademark logo; it can be seen under the strings in the centre of a piano's soundboard.

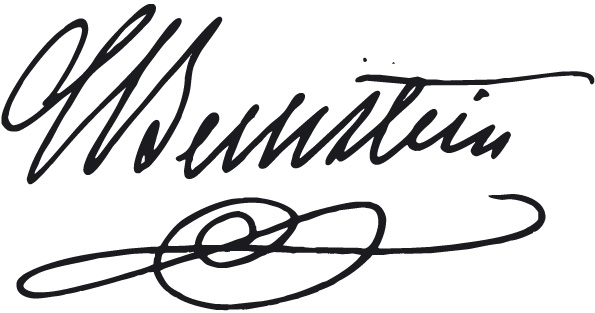
The signature of Carl Bechstein

The years from the 1870s through 1914 brought Bechstein their most dramatic increase in sales. In 1880 a second Bechstein factory was opened in Berlin, and the third factory opened in 1897 in Berlin-Kreuzberg. Production reached 3,700 pianos annually in 1900, and 4,600 in 1910, making Bechstein the largest German manufacturer of high-end pianos. At that time, about three quarters of production went to international markets, especially Britain and the Commonwealth, and Russia.

Carl Bechstein died in 1900, and the Bechstein company continued to operate under the management of his sons.

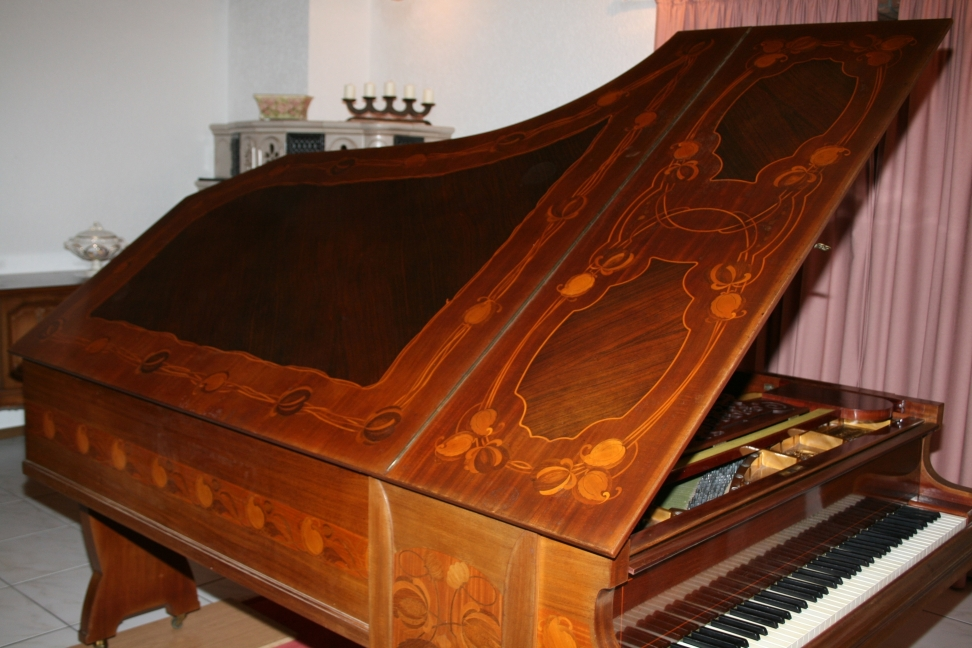
Bechstein Art Nouveau grand piano, 1902

Between 1900 and 1914 C. Bechstein was one of the leading piano makers in the world, employing 1,200 craftsmen and workers by 1913 and making five thousand pianos per year.

=== First World War ===
C. Bechstein suffered huge property losses in London, Paris, and St. Petersburg during World War I. The largest loss was in London. Although the company's position in the United Kingdom was initially unaffected, with the company still listed as holding a royal warrant in January 1915, warrants to both King George V, and his wife Queen Mary were cancelled on 13 April 1915. Bechstein was not the only musical concern to be affected by growing anti-German sentiment: there were earlier attempts, led by William Boosey, the managing director of Chappell & Co., to boycott German music altogether. In 1915 Sir Edgar Speyer—despite being a Baronet and Privy Counsellor who was then funding the Proms—was forced to leave the country. Following the passing of the Trading with the Enemy Amendment Act 1916 the British arm of the company was wound-up on 5 June 1916, all Bechstein property, including the concert hall and showrooms full of pianos, were seized as "enemy property" and closed. In 1916 the hall was sold as alien property at auction to Debenhams for £56,500. It was renamed Wigmore Hall, and then re-opened under the new name in 1917. All 137 Bechstein pianos at the Bechstein showrooms were confiscated too, and became property of the new owner of the Hall. After a dispute with his brother, Edwin Bechstein left the company and was paid off. After a century away, in 2021 the Bechstein company won planning permission to build a new showroom and hall at 22 Wigmore Street, just a few buildings East of the Wigmore Hall. The 100 seat venue, a $30m investment, is due to open in 2023.

=== Between the wars ===
Eventually the Bechstein factory resumed full-scale production during the 1920s. At that time, technical innovations and inventions of new materials and tools, as well as improvements in piano design and construction, had allowed Bechstein to become one of the leading piano makers again.

The most successful models were the updated "A"-185 and "B"-208 grand pianos. The upright pianos became more popular after the war, and C. Bechstein were successful with its upright pianos Model-8 and Model-9, both of which have been considered the finest upright pianos.

The company became a joint-stock company 1923, allowing Edwin Bechstein and his wife Helene, to re-purchase part of the company as shareholders.

In London a small number of budget-quality baby grand pianos 4'8" in size were built and marketed. They are cast "Bechstein London" on the frame and C. Bechstein on the fall board.

In 1930, the company collaborated with German electrical goods manufacturer Siemens under Nobel Prize laureate Walther Nernst to produce one of the first electric pianos, the "Neo-Bechstein" or "Siemens-Bechstein" electric grand, using electromagnetic pickups.

Edwin Bechstein and his wife, Helene Bechstein, who was an ardent admirer of the Nazi leader Adolf Hitler, bestowed many gifts on Hitler including his first luxury car, a red Mercedes costing 26,000 marks. Helene Bechstein and her friend Elsa Bruckmann introduced Hitler to Germany's cultural elite in Berlin and Munich. "I wish he were my son," she said.

After Edwin Bechstein died in 1934 in Berchtesgaden, where he had a villa named "Bechstein" in a short distance to the Obersalzberg, his body was transferred to Berlin. He was buried following a state funeral attended by Adolf Hitler and NSDAP politicians, including Wilhelm Frick and Max Amann.

=== World War II ===
In 1945, allied bombing raids destroyed the Bechstein piano factory in Berlin, along with the firm's stores of valuable wood, including the precious Alpine spruce used to make soundboards. The war also cost the company many of its experienced craftsmen. For several years after the war, Bechstein could not resume full-scale production of pianos and made only a few pianos per year.

=== After World War II ===
After de-Nazification of the C. Bechstein Company, it began to produce pianos again in 1948. C. Bechstein eventually increased piano production to about a thousand pianos per year during the 1950s and 1960s. However, the new economic situation in the post-war world was hard for the piano business. In 1961, the Bechstein piano factory was affected by the construction of the Berlin Wall. The ownership of C. Bechstein had changed several times. In 1963, all the shares were sold to the Baldwin Piano Company. Until the reunification of Germany, the company was making fewer pianos, although the quality of craftsmanship remained high.

In 1953, the centennial of Bechstein was celebrated by the Berlin Philharmonic under Wilhelm Furtwängler and Wilhelm Backhaus. Many entertainers and concert pianists, such as Leonard Bernstein, Jorge Bolet, and Wilhelm Kempff, favoured Bechstein pianos. The State Ministry of Culture of the Soviet Union made a contract to supply major state philharmonic orchestras and concert halls across the USSR with three brands of pianos: Steinway & Sons, Blüthner, and Bechstein. Blüthner and Bechstein were also made the staple practice pianos at the Leningrad Conservatory and Moscow Conservatory, while most other music schools of the USSR were limited mainly to the Soviet-made pianos. Concert pianists, such as Dinu Lipatti, Shura Cherkassky, Tatiana Nikolayeva, Vladimir Sofronitsky, and Sviatoslav Richter, among others, often chose Bechstein pianos for their studio recordings.

=== After the fall of the Berlin Wall ===
In 1986, Karl Schulze, German entrepreneur and master piano maker, bought Bechstein and continued the legacy of fine piano making. Due to reunification of Germany and elimination of the Berlin Wall, the land formerly belonging to the Bechstein factory was used for new construction in the capital. In 1992 Bechstein started a new factory in Saxony for C. Bechstein and Zimmermann instruments. The manufacturing of Zimmermann instruments in Seifhennersdorf discontinued at the end of 2011.

In 1993 the company applied for bankruptcy protection. The Berlin city government saved the company by purchasing the company's land in Kreuzberg, with Bechstein remaining as a tenant. The company withdrew its application for bankruptcy, and planned to reduce its remaining debt by selling inventory, and further sales of real estate.

In 1996, C. Bechstein went public. In 2003, Bechstein formed a partnership with Samick, in order to improve overseas distribution. Today, after the successful capital increase in 2009, Samick no longer has any shares. Nowadays major shareholders are Arnold Kuthe Beteiligungs GmbH as well as Karl Schulze and his wife Berenice Küpper, all Berlin investors.

By 2006, the company opened eight upscale showrooms and increased the number of Bechstein dealerships in major cities across Europe, North America and Asia. New Bechstein centres were opened in recent years in New York, Moscow, Shanghai as well as partner centres in Kyiv, Seoul, Sydney, and the Netherlands.

In 2007, the new C. Bechstein Europe factory opened in Hradec Králové, Czech Republic. Bechstein has invested millions of Euros to build up a new manufacturing site especially for W. Hoffmann instruments. All brands and instruments made by C. Bechstein now exclusively originate from Europe.(but see Zimmerman in 'Brands' below)

Along with the company's economic success, C. Bechstein's concert grand pianos are making their comeback on international concert stages and in recording studios.

In 2006, the first international C. Bechstein Piano Competition took place under Vladimir Ashkenazy's patronage. National C. Bechstein competitions regularly foster the musical development of young artists.

As of 1 January 2017, the group is headed up by new management: Stefan Freymuth has taken over as CEO of C. Bechstein Pianoforte AG, replacing Karl Schulze who had led the group since 1986 and will stay on to advise the new CEO as general representative.

=== Artcase pianos ===
Bechstein has been known as a maker of one-of-a-kind artcase pianos since the 19th century. Artcase pianos were commissioned by interior designers for royal palaces and mansions. Artists and craftsmen were hired by C. Bechstein to make special pianos decorated with gold, hand-carved details, and hand-painted art on the piano case. Some of the artcase Bechsteins are now museum pieces, while others are sometimes traded at musical-instrument auctions, mainly in London and New York.

== Current grand piano models ==
=== C. Bechstein Concert ===
Model	Length	Weight
D 282	282 cm (9 ft 3 in)	521 kg
C 234	234 cm (7 ft 8 in)	437 kg
B 212	212 cm (6 ft 11 in)	399 kg
A 192 (M/P 192)	192 cm (6 ft 4 in)	350 kg
L 167	167 cm (5 ft 6 in)	317 kg

=== C. Bechstein Academy ===
Model	Length	Weight
A 228 (B 228)	228 cm (7 ft 6 in)	417 kg
A 208 (B 208)	208 cm (6 ft 10 in)	375 kg
A 190 (B 190)	190 cm (6 ft 3 in)	348 kg
A 175	175 cm (5 ft 9 in)	334 kg
A 160 (B 160)	160 cm (5 ft 3 in)	308 kg

== Current upright piano models ==
=== C. Bechstein Concert ===
Model	Height	Weight
Concert 8	131 cm (52 in)	255 kg
Concert 6	126 cm (50 in)	254 kg
Elegance R6	124 cm (49 in)	260 kg
Classic R6	124 cm (49 in)	261 kg
Contur R4	118 cm (46 in)	246 kg
Classic R4	118 cm (46 in)	244 kg
Millenium R2	116 cm (46 in)	233 kg

=== C. Bechstein Academy ===
Model	Height	Weight
A6	124 cm (49 in)	251 kg
A6	124 cm (49 in)	251 kg
A2	114 cm (45 in)	235 kg
A2	114 cm (45 in)	231 kg
A2	114 cm (45 in)	231 kg

== Discontinued piano models ==
=== Grand piano models up to 1902 ===
Model	Length
I	275 cm (9 ft 0 in)
II	254 cm (8 ft 4 in)
III	234 cm (7 ft 8 in)
IV	218 cm (7 ft 2 in)
V	200 cm (6 ft 7 in)
VI	183 cm (6 ft 0 in)

=== Grand piano models after 1902 ===
Model	Length
E	275 cm (9')
D	250 cm (8 ft 2 in)
C	225 cm (7 ft 5 in)
B	203 cm (6 ft 8 in)
A	182 cm (6 ft 0 in)

=== Grand piano models introduced in the 1920s ===
Model	Length
M	178 cm (5 ft 10 in)
L	168 cm (5 ft 6 in)
K	155 cm (5 ft 1 in)
S	140 cm (4 ft 7 in)

=== Upright piano models up to 1902 ===
Model	Height
I	145 cm
II	138 cm
III	127 cm
IV	122 cm
V (Straight strung)	127 cm

=== Upright piano models after 1902 ===
Model	Height
6	145 cm
7	138 cm
8	127 cm
9	122 cm
10 (Straight strung)	127 cm

== Brands ==
In addition to the C. Bechstein brand, C. Bechstein manufactures two other brands: W. Hoffmann for the mid-level market and Zimmermann for the entry-level market.

=== W. Hoffmann ===
Made for the mid-level piano market, W. Hoffmann pianos are designed by C. Bechstein and built by C. Bechstein Europe factory in Hradec Králové, Czech Republic.

=== Zimmermann ===
Made for the entry-level piano market, Zimmermann pianos are designed by C. Bechstein and built by Hailun Piano Company factory in Ningbo, China.

== Composers ==
Four musicians who composed on Bechstein pianos were Edvard Grieg, Alexander Scriabin, Maurice Ravel, Béla Bartók.

== Performers ==
Students and followers of Hans von Bülow and Franz Liszt also developed loyalty to Bechstein pianos.

Alexander Scriabin owned a concert-size Bechstein at his Moscow home, which is now a national museum, and Scriabin's piano is still played at scheduled recitals. Tatiana Nikolayeva preferred the Bechstein for her acclaimed recordings of the music of Bach. Sviatoslav Richter grew up studying piano on a Bechstein and remembered his experience with that piano as stimulating and rewarding.

Claude Debussy said "Piano music should only be written for the Bechstein".

Edwin Fischer chose a Bechstein piano for his pioneering recording of Bach's The Well Tempered Clavier, as did Artur Schnabel for his cycle of Beethoven's 32 piano sonatas. Both artists were very fond of Bechstein pianos, as were many of the 20th century's leading pianists, such as Wilhelm Kempff, Wilhelm Backhaus, Walter Gieseking and Jorge Bolet.

Polish pianist Władysław Szpilman (famous thanks to the movie The Pianist) used a Bechstein piano until 1941 in his family private apartments in Warsaw.

For his studio recording of the music of Chopin and Beethoven, Dinu Lipatti used a Bechstein piano.

Bob Dylan played a Bechstein piano at the ABC Theatre in Edinburgh, Scotland, on 20 May 1966. He is mentioned on many Bechstein dealers' web pages as a regular Bechstein player. When Dave Stewart of The Eurythmics listed his Bechstein piano for auction, he named Bob Dylan as one of the musicians who had played the piano.

The Bechstein concert grand at London's Trident Studios, over a century old and much sought after for its sound, became one of the most frequently recorded instruments in rock history. The piano can be heard on The Beatles' "Hey Jude," Elton John's "Your Song," George Harrison's "All Things Must Pass," David Bowie's "Life on Mars?," Lou Reed's "Perfect Day," Queen's "Seven Seas of Rhye," Carly Simon's "You're So Vain," Nilsson's "Without You," and Supertramp's "Crime of the Century". It saw service in the studio from 1968 until the mid-1980s, and has since been sold at auction.

The music video for Elton John's "Sorry Seems to Be the Hardest Word" features John playing a white Bechstein grand.

Oscar Peterson played and owned a Bechstein throughout much of his career, publicity contracts with rival manufacturers notwithstanding.

Anna Ivanova (2011) played Liszt's personal 1880 Bechstein grand piano, which is displayed in the Liszt Haus in Weimar (DDR). Recordings of her playing both this grand piano, and the Bechstein 576 (which was delivered 17 March 1862 to Franz Liszt), which presently is being displayed at the Bechstein Centre in Berlin (Deutschland Global), can be found on YouTube.

Kate Bush plays an upright Bechstein. "I think my favourite piano is the one I have at home. It's an upright Bechstein. It's absolutely beautiful, but it's not ideal for master recordings. For me, the piano is one of the most difficult things to record well. It sounds good in the room, but it doesn't always sound good coming through the speakers. We find that we have to do quite a bit of work on them to get them to sound good on tape."

== Awards ==
- In 1862, C. Bechstein was awarded gold medals at the London International Exhibition.
- In 2007, C. Bechstein received the iF Gold Award for C. Bechstein Piano Model Millennium.

== See also ==
- Florian Essenfelder, piano maker
