= Helene Bechstein =

German socialite and businesswoman

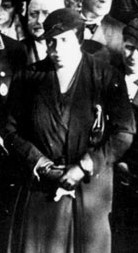
- Helene Bechstein in 1934
- Born: Helene Capito; 21 May 1876; Düsseldorf, German Empire
- Died: 20 April 1951 (aged 74); West Germany
- Known for: Etiquette tutor for Adolf Hitler
- Spouse: Edwin Bechstein

Signature
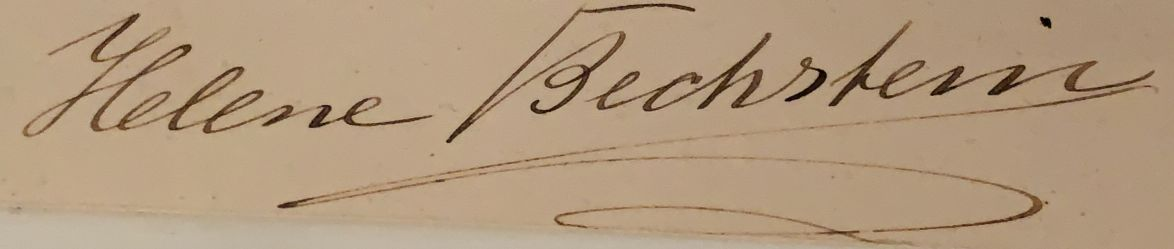

Helene Bechstein née Capito (German pronunciation: [heˈleːnə ˈbɛçʃtaɪn]; 26 May 1876 – 20 April 1951) was a German socialite and businesswoman. She was an etiquette tutor for Adolf Hitler and was the wife of Edwin Bechstein, the owner and later majority shareholder of C. Bechstein, a leading manufacturer of pianos.

== Background ==
Helene Capito was born in Düsseldorf on 21 May 1876. Helene married Edwin Bechstein, the son of Carl Bechstein, the owner of the C. Bechstein piano factory. Both Helene and her husband were conservative nationalists.

In 1923, following C. Bechstein becoming a limited company, Helene and Carl started buying the majority of shares with Helene speaking in public on the company's behalf. At numerous events, she was heard making antisemitic comments, which led to a number of high-profile musicians boycotting C. Bechstein pianos. In 1934, the company was restructured so that Helene became the majority shareholder. To help raise capital, she sold company property to Hermann Göring through his capacity as Minister President of Prussia.

== Hitler ==
Bechstein first met Adolf Hitler in 1921 through the writer Dietrich Eckart at her Berchtesgaden villa. She took a liking to him, invited him to stay at her home when he was in Berlin, and when he was imprisoned after the failed Beer Hall Putsch, she would regularly visit him in prison. She once claimed to the prison that he was her adopted son. Upon Hitler's release, Bechstein introduced him to German high society in Berlin. Along with Elsa Bruckmann and Winifred Wagner, she helped to teach Hitler table manners and helped reform his public image. Bechstein also bought him neat shoes and respectable evening dress.

Both Bechstein and Hitler grew close to each other, with Bechstein giving Hitler gifts including a Daimler built Mercedes, which cost RM26,000. She called him "mein Wölfchen" ("my little wolf"), stating she would have liked to have had him as a son. Hitler reciprocated by allegedly giving her an original manuscript of Mein Kampf. The Bechsteins both publicly funded Hitler, giving him the funds to continue publishing the newspaper Völkischer Beobachter.

When the Nazis came to power in 1933, Hitler awarded her the Golden Party Badge in 1934. Bechstein herself did not join the Nazi Party until 1944. Bechstein had hoped that Hitler would marry her daughter.

== Later life ==
After Nazi Germany's surrender in the Second World War, C. Bechstein was commandeered by the Allies in the US Occupation Zone and Bechstein's shares were confiscated by the Americans. The company was not permitted to start making pianos again until 1948. Bechstein herself was sentenced to 60 days hard labour and had 30% of her assets stripped from her for being a Nazi collaborator. She died in 1951.
