= Edwin Bechstein =

German businessman and early supporter of Adolf Hitler (1859-1934)

- Born: 11 February 1859; Berlin, German Confederation
- Died: 15 September 1934 (aged 75); Berchtesgaden, Bavaria, Nazi Germany
- Occupations: Piano maker, businessman
- Known for: Financial supporter of Adolf Hitler
- Spouse: Helene Bechstein

Signature
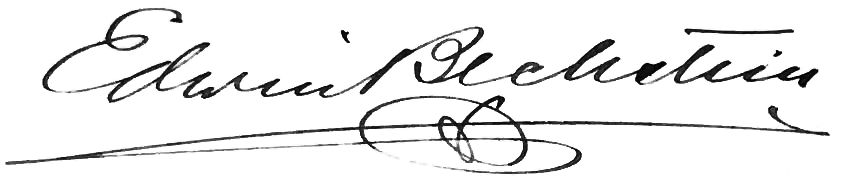

Edwin Bechstein (German pronunciation: [ˈɛtvɪn ˈbɛçʃtaɪn]; 11 February 1859 – 15 September 1934) was a German piano maker and businessman and early supporter of Adolf Hitler. He was the son of Carl Bechstein and was the owner of the C. Bechstein piano company from 1900 to 1923 when it became a limited company. A later restructuring in 1934 put his wife Helene Bechstein as majority shareholder. He died on 15 September 1934 and received a state funeral attended by Hitler and other Nazi Party officials.

== Early career ==
Bechstein was born in 1859 as the oldest of three brothers, Carl Jr., and Johannes, sons of the piano maker Carl Bechstein. He took over the company from his father in 1900 following Carl's death. He spent most of his time working in the firm's London operations and influenced the design of the Bechstein Theatre (later renamed Wigmore Hall) in London. Whilst in London he met Helene Capito, whom he would marry. During the First World War, Bechstein left the United Kingdom in 1914 with the company's assets being seized as enemy property in 1916 under the Trading With The Enemy Amendment Act 1916. In 1923, C. Bechstein became a limited company with all three brothers on the board. In 1926, Bechstein was behind the opening of a new showroom on Berlin's Kurfürstendamm.

== Hitler ==
In 1921, Edwin met Hitler and lent him the Bechstein's home as a Berlin residence. The Bechsteins supported Hitler and the NSDAP and gave him financial contributions with Edwin specifically helping to fund the publication of the Nazi Völkischer Beobachter newspaper. Following his release from prison after the Beer Hall Putsch, Helene had been teaching Hitler table manners and Edwin introduced him into German high society. In 1923 Edwin, Helene and Dietrich Eckart took Hitler to visit Siegfried Wagner and introduced them. At the time, Bechstein was the guardian of Wagner's daughter Winifred and responsible for her education. Reportedly Siegfried Wagner regarded Hitler as a "fraud and an upstart" for appearing before him in a traditional Bavarian checked shirt and leather shorts.

Much of the money Bechstein gave to Hitler was undocumented with the only recorded transaction being when Bechstein guaranteed Hitler for a loan of RM26,000 for a new car. However, due to his closeness with Hitler and the Nazis, Bechstein was ejected from the board of C. Bechstein because of negative press coverage about it impacting the company. Though Edwin retained shares, his close family took control in 1934 when a company restructuring made Helene the majority shareholder. Hitler also resided at Bechstein's apartment on 29 January 1933 on his last day as a private citizen before becoming Chancellor of Germany.

== Death ==
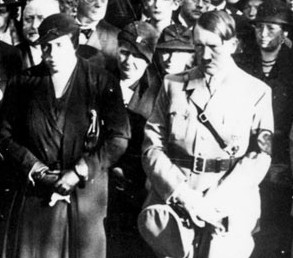
Helene and Hitler at Edwin's state funeral

Bechstein died on 15 September 1934 in Berchtesgaden. Hitler gave him a state funeral in Berlin, attending personally along with other high ranking Nazi officials. He was buried in Friedhof II der Sophiengemeinde Berlin though his grave was later lost.
