= Kate Kühl =

German performer and actor

Kate Kühl (born Elfriede Katharina Nehrhaupt: 16 December 1899 – 29 January 1970) was a German cabaret performer, chanteuse and film actor. After 1933, her brand of political cabaret was no longer permitted and she found herself subject of a Berufsverbot (government work ban): she left Berlin and supported herself as a regional (unnamed) radio announcer. She was able to return to the stage after 1945, however.

== Biography ==
=== Early years ===
Katharina Nehrhaupt was born in Cologne where her father worked as a physician. He recognized and backed his daughter's artistic ambitions from early on. As a nineteen year old, shortly after the end of the World War I, she came to Berlin in 1919 to obtain a classical training as a singer. She was accepted at the prestigious Stern Conservatory (today part of the Berlin University of the Arts), and quickly acquired the potential to build a career as an oratorio singer. But she very soon parted company with the mainstream classical repertoire. Katharina preferred to engage with the more bohemian world in the western part of Berlin, with its coffee houses and artists' districts that clustered around the (at that time complete) Kaiser Wilhelm Memorial Church. A particularly fashionable meeting point for the youthful postwar arts and literature set was the Café des Westens (often identified by the mocking soubriquet Café Größenwahn) on the corner of the Kurfürstendamm and the Joachimsthaler Straße. Another regular at the Café Größenwahn was the sculptor Karsten Kühl (?–1964). They married in or around 1920. Kühl was instrumental in Katharina's decision to become a cabaret artiste.

=== Cabaret and theatre ===
Karsten Kühl told his young wife that the established cabaretiste Rosa Valetti was planning to set up her own "literary cabaret" upstairs, directly above the Café des Westens. Kate Kühl sent the artist a letter offering her services and was instantly offered a job by Valetti. Four days after her twenty-first birthday, on 23 December 1920, she made her stage debut, performing a series of chansons to her first cabaret audience. Her restrained yet coarse delivery created overnight a completely new style of erotic ballad style cabaret presentation, which she applied to the lyrics of Klabund and Walter Mehring. Her debut did not go unremarked, and she quickly came to know musicians and composers such as Friedrich Hollaender and Werner Richard Heymann. She was also befriended by "rival artistes" including Blandine Ebinger and Annemarie Hase. But within this circle there was one new friendship which would be more important and long-lasting than any of these others in building and sustaining her artistic career: according to one commentator, for Kühl's idiosyncratic performing style the couplets penned by Kurt Tucholsky resonated just as finely as the songs, chansons and ballads of Mehring or indeed Brecht. The first song that Tucholsky both wrote himself and had performed in public, "Schiff ahoi!", was indeed written for "his muse", Kate Kühl.

The "Cabaret Größenwahn", as it had become known, under the leadership of Rosa Valetti, flourished only briefly. Postwar Weimar Germany was overwhelmed by crippling reparation requirements and hyperinflation between 1921 and 1923. Many cabaret venues were forced to close down, but some nevertheless survived. That was the context in which Trude Hesterberg was able to entice Kühl to work at her cabaret, the Wilde Bühne in the Tingel-Tangel-Theater, at which (again) Kurt Tucholsky was a regular patron. Tucholsky's chanson "Die Dorfschöne", dedicated, as he expressed it, to his "Kulicke", dates from this period. In February 1924 "Tucho" accepted an offer from Siegfried Jacobsohn which involved moving to Paris as a theatre critic for Die Weltbühne and the Vossische Zeitung, but he retained in frequent contact with her, both on account of his regular trips home to Berlin and through an animated exchange of letters which was at once professional and friendly. During the second part of the 1920s, Kühl performed on all Berlin's principal cabaret stages including those at Kabarett der Komiker (KadeKo) at Die Katakombe. She also enjoyed professional success on the Berlin theatre stage, appearing on 31 August 1928 at the Theater am Schiffbauerdamm in the premiere of The Threepenny Opera by Kurt Weill und Bertolt Brecht. She was engaged to play the part of Lucy, the daughter of the London police chief.

=== National Socialist years ===
By the early 1930s the glory days of Berlin cabaret were fading. As politics in the country became more polarised, the remaining cabaret shows became less politicised, content to soothe patrons with happy melodies. Outside on the streets violent confrontations between Nazi Paramilitaries and communist "Red Front Fighters" were becoming more frequent and more bitter. Kühl and the other performers made no secret of their hostility to Nazism and after the power seizure in January 1933 many of the better known cabaret celebrities disappeared overnight, turning up abroad a few weeks later. Most, including Kühl, were prevented from pursuing their careers in Nazi Germany by a Berufsverbot (government work ban). Nevertheless, she remained in Germany, working as an unnamed radio announcer on local radio stations and supplementing her income by sometimes taking supporting roles in entertainment films.

=== After the war ===
Directly after the war, Kühl became a member of one of the first newly established Berlin Cabaret groups, Die Außenseiter (The Outsiders), co-founded by Curth Flatow. Many of her closest friends and associates from before World War II were by now dead. Still surviving was Ernst Busch, with whom she now formed a close and enduring professional friendship. It was Busch who persuaded her to cross the (at this stage still for many purposes invisible and ignorable) border into the eastern part of Berlin, which had ended up after May 1945 as part of the Soviet occupation zone. She also took the significant step of joining a political party, the Communist Party. Together Kühl and Busch appeared in the productions of Bertolt Brecht. Busch helped Kühl launch her career as a recording artist in the Soviet zone (relaunched in October 1949 as the Soviet sponsored German Democratic Republic (East Germany)). After Brecht and Helene Weigel, his wife, launched the Berliner Ensemble in 1949, Kühl appeared in several stage productions with that company. She also embarked on musical collaborations with Brecht's friend, the composer Hanns Eisler and, later, with the composer-librettist Boris Blacher.

The so-called Inner German border remained relatively permeable through much of the 1950s, and in the middle of the decade Kühl relocated from East Berlin to West Berlin. By this time the Cold War had become a fact of life for Europeans, and she had moved close to the West German Social Democratic Party which she supported, most particularly, in the struggle against the growing threat of another major war.

== Filmography (selection) ==
- Morgenrot (1933)
- Ich und die Kaiserin (1933) Director: Friedrich Hollaender
- Capriccio (1938) Director: Karl Ritter
- Hello Janine! (1939) Director: Carl Boese
- Wir tanzen um die Welt (1939) Director: Kal Anton
- Central Rio (1939)
- Achtung! Feind hört mit! (1940) – Director: Arthur Maria Rabenalt
- The Swedish Nightingale (1941) – Director: Peter Paul Brauer
- Ein Windstoß (1941)
- My Friend Josephine (1942) – Director: Hans H. Zerlett
- Aufruhr des Herzens (1944) – Director: Hans Müller
- Light of Heart (1943)
- Der verzauberte Tag (1944) – Director: Peter Pewas
