= Café des Westens =

Coffeehouse in Berlin

Coordinates: 52°30′14″N 13°19′52″E

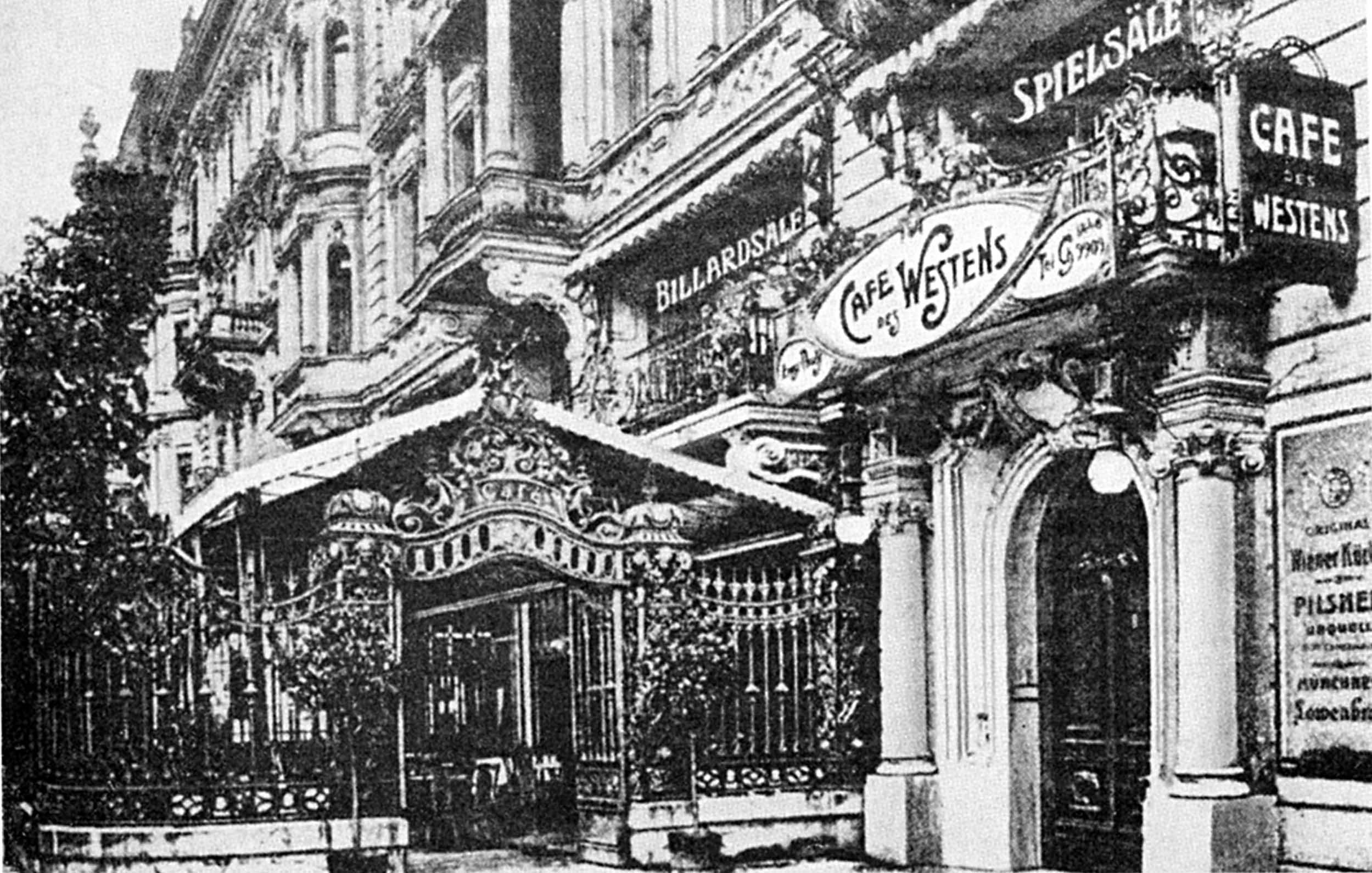
Kurfürstendamm 1819 Berlin, former Café des Westens

The Café des Westens, on No.18/19 Kurfürstendamm in Berlin, was a coffeehouse which operated from 1898 to 1915, and became famous as a meeting place for turn of the century artists. It was known colloquially as Café Größenwahn; the German Größenwahn meaning "delusions of grandeur".

== History ==
The café opened in 1893 on the ground floor of a newly erected lavish residential building in Charlottenburg, part of the Wilhelmine Ring in the fashionable "New West" area next to the German capital. Then named Kleines Café ("Little Café"), it was one of the first coffee houses on Kurfürstendamm boulevard and soon became a popular venue for a literary circle around Maximilian Bern. Renamed Café des Westens in 1898, with new cuisine, it gained attractiveness even for artists from the historic city centre in present-day Berlin-Mitte. In 1904, the establishment was again enlarged, with a billiard room on the first floor.

Over the years, several artist groups met here regularly: writers and critics like Alfred Kerr and Herbert Ihering, painters around Max Liebermann, as well as a regulars' table of operetta composers led by Paul Lincke, Walter Kollo, and Jean Gilbert. At the café, Ernst von Wolzogen sketched the idea for his Überbrettl cabaret, opened in 1901 and soon followed by Max Reinhardt's Schall und Rauch ("Smoke and Mirrors"), the first of numerous Kabarett venues in Germany. Reinhardt and Christian Morgenstern were heads of an aspiring Bohème circle; Richard Strauss, Maximilian Harden, Ludwig Fulda, Paul Lindau, Frank Wedekind, and Carl Sternheim were regular guests. Painters like Emil Orlík and Ernst Oppler, both members of the Berlin Secession, caught the dynamic atmosphere in their drawings.

In pre-World War I times, Café des Westens became a centre of the German Expressionist literary movement: around Else Lasker-Schüler and her husband Herwarth Walden, artists like René Schickele, Roda Roda, Johannes Schlaf, Erich Mühsam and John Henry Mackay, Paul Scheerbart, Frank Wedekind, Carl Sternheim und Leonhard Frank, Salomo Friedlaender, and Jakob van Hoddis met up here. In 1910 Walden developed the idea for his Der Sturm literary magazine at the coffeehouse table, as did Franz Pfemfert in the following year publishing Die Aktion.

The café was the setting for Rupert Brooke's poem The Old Vicarage, Grantchester subtitled "Cafe des Westens, Berlin, May 1912". "This was the time when the Berlin cafés played an important part in our lives," Walter Benjamin wrote of 1914, “And let there be no mistaking: the headquarters of Bohemia up into the first years of the War was the old Café des Westens. Our world was a different one from the emancipated crowd that surrounded us there...Once, Else Lasker-Schüler drew me over to her table...”

Under increasing attacks by the conservative press, the café lost the patronage of many artists after management changes in 1913 and closed two years later. After World War I, the establishment reopened as the Rosa Valetti's Kabarett Größenwahn from 1920 to 1922. Nevertheless, the main literary venue had switched to the nearby Romanisches Café vis-à-vis Kaiser Wilhelm Memorial Church. In 1932 the original rooms of the Café des Westens were reopened as a branch of the Café Kranzler. The building was destroyed during the bombing of Berlin in World War II, in April 1945.
