= Waldorf Astoria Berlin =

Luxury hotel in Germany

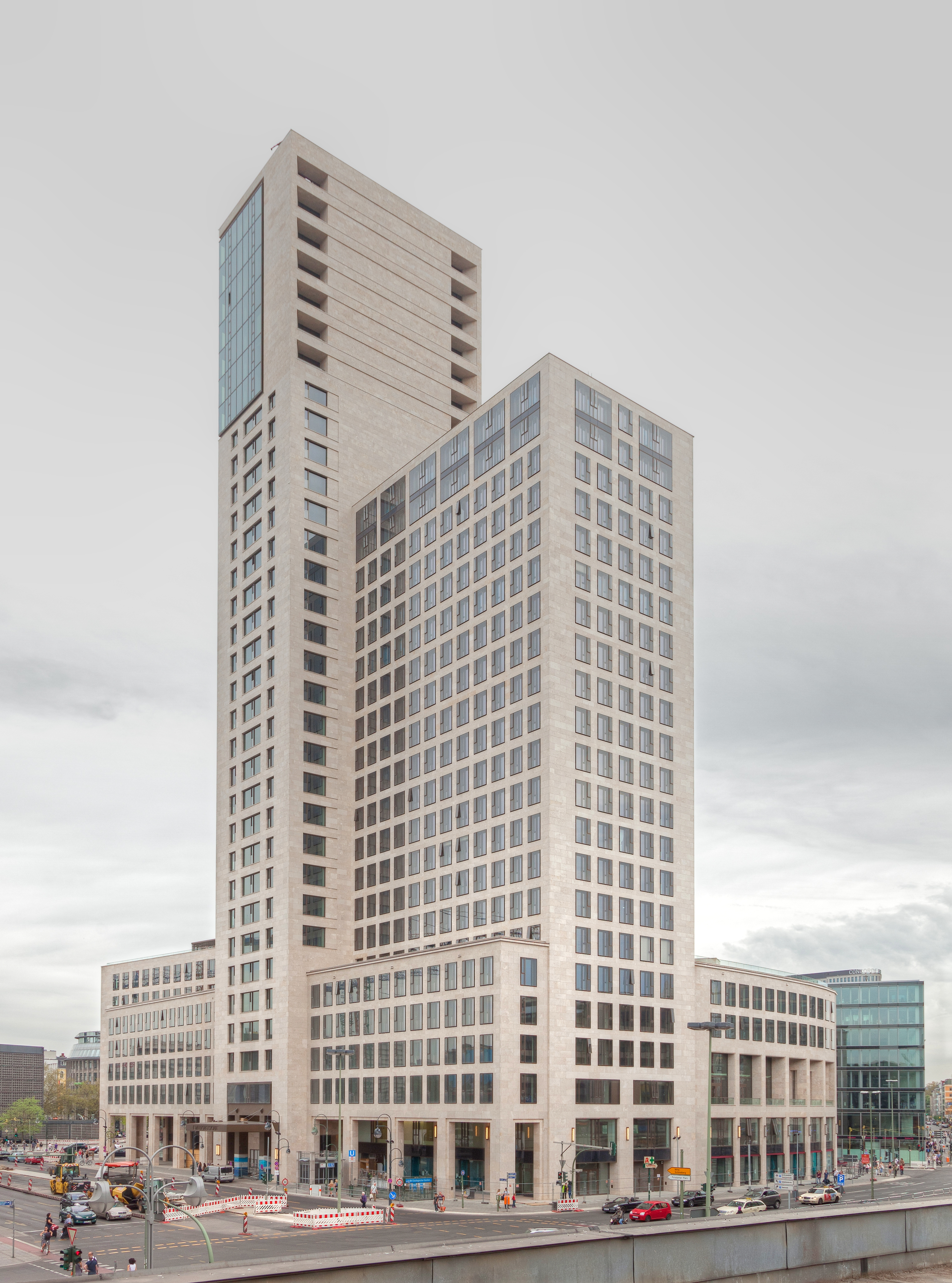
- Waldorf Astoria Berlin in April 2012

- Location within Berlin
- Hotel chain: Waldorf Astoria

General information
- Status: Open
- Type: Hotel
- Architectural style: Contemporary
- Classification: 5 stars
- Location: Hardenbergstrasse 28, Berlin, Germany
- Coordinates: 52.505695°N 13.333033°E
- Opening: 3 January 2013
- Owner: Hilton Worldwide

Website
- Official website

Waldorf Astoria Berlin is a hotel in Berlin, Germany. It is located at Breitscheidplatz in the City West area of Berlin, next to the upscale retail area Kurfürstendamm. It opened on January 3, 2013, and is the first Waldorf Astoria branded hotel in Germany. Waldorf Astoria Spa, the only one in Germany, is located at the hotel.

== Building ==
The Waldorf Astoria Berlin is situated in the Berlin building Zoofenster. It is a skyscraper in the district of Charlottenburg in Berlin. It has 32 floors and a height of 118 m and was constructed from July 2008 to March 2012.

== Awards ==
The hotel won World Luxury Spa Awards for 2014, and a Europe's Leading New Hotel of World Travel Awards.

== See also ==
- List of tallest buildings in Berlin
