= Café Kranzler =

Former café in Berlin, Germany

Coordinates: 52.504°N 13.331°E

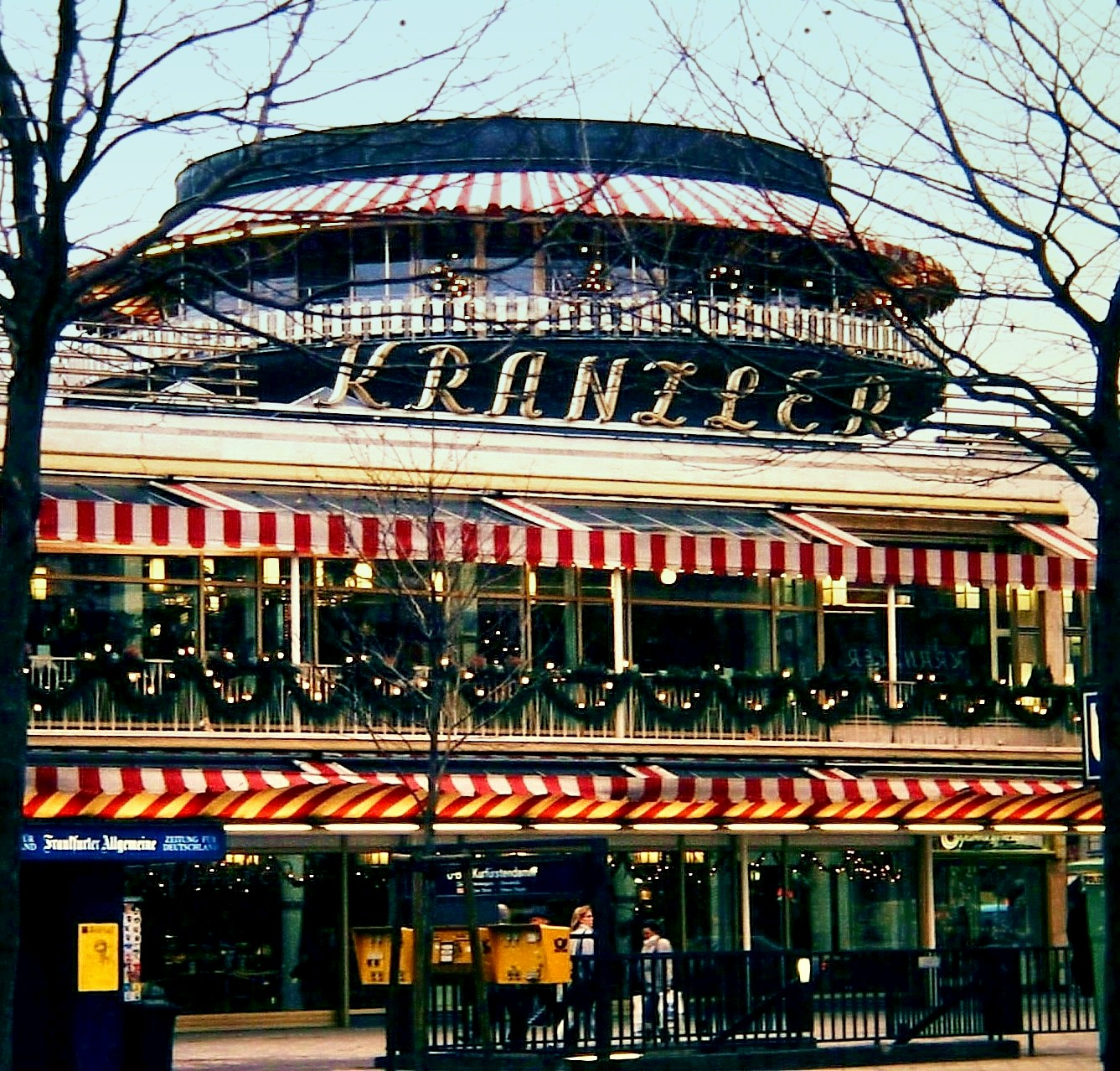
Café Kranzler on Kurfürstendamm, 1988

Café Kranzler is a famous coffeehouse in Berlin, Germany. Opened in 1834 on the Unter den Linden boulevard in the central Mitte district, its Western branch on Kurfürstendamm in Charlottenburg became an icon of West Berlin after World War II.

== History ==
In 1825 the Austrian-born confectionist Johann Georg Kranzler (1795–1866) began business in a small pastry shop (Konditorei) on Unter den Linden No. 25, at the corner of Friedrichstraße (present-day site of The Westin Grand).

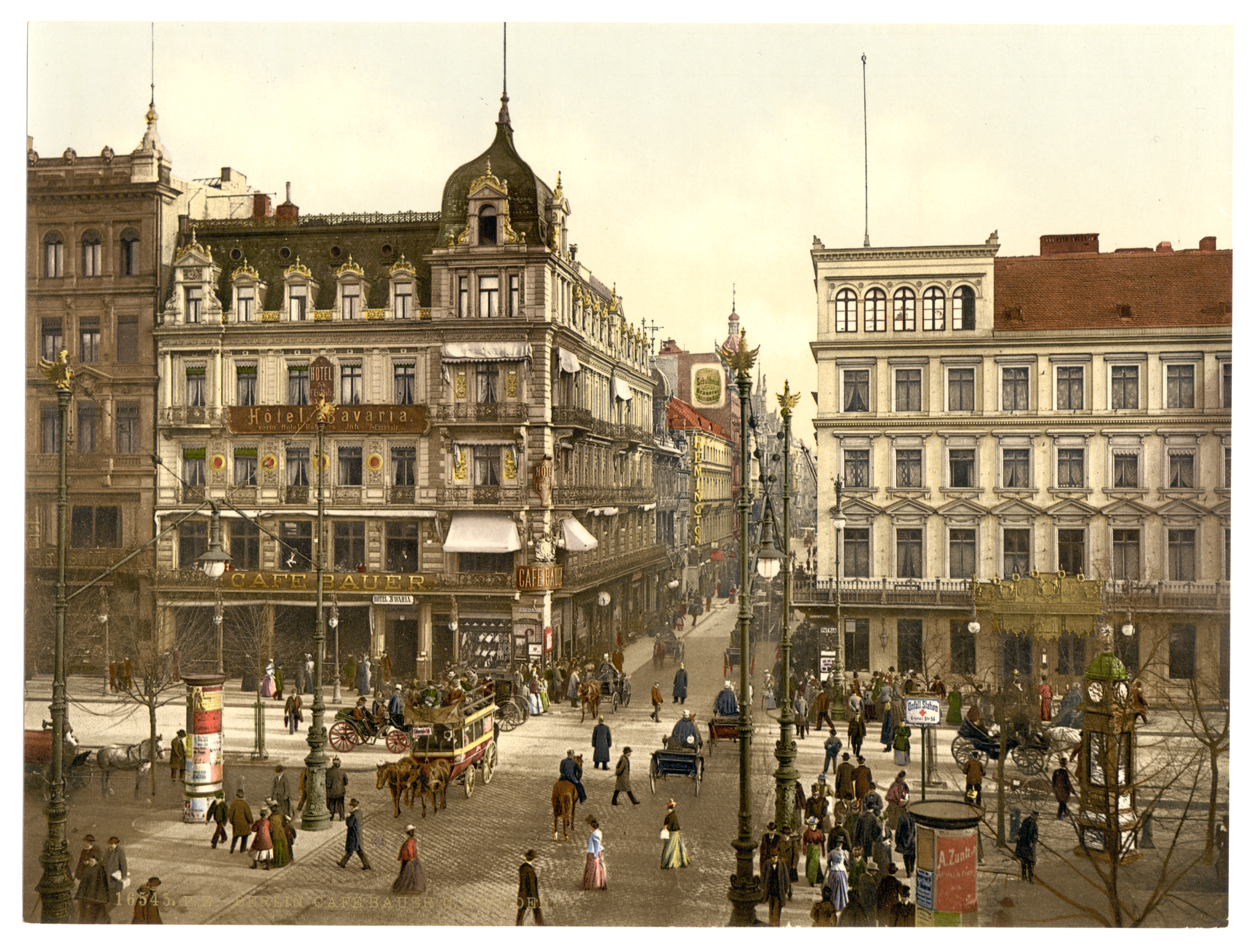
Café Bauer and Café Kranzler (right) Unter den Linden, about 1900

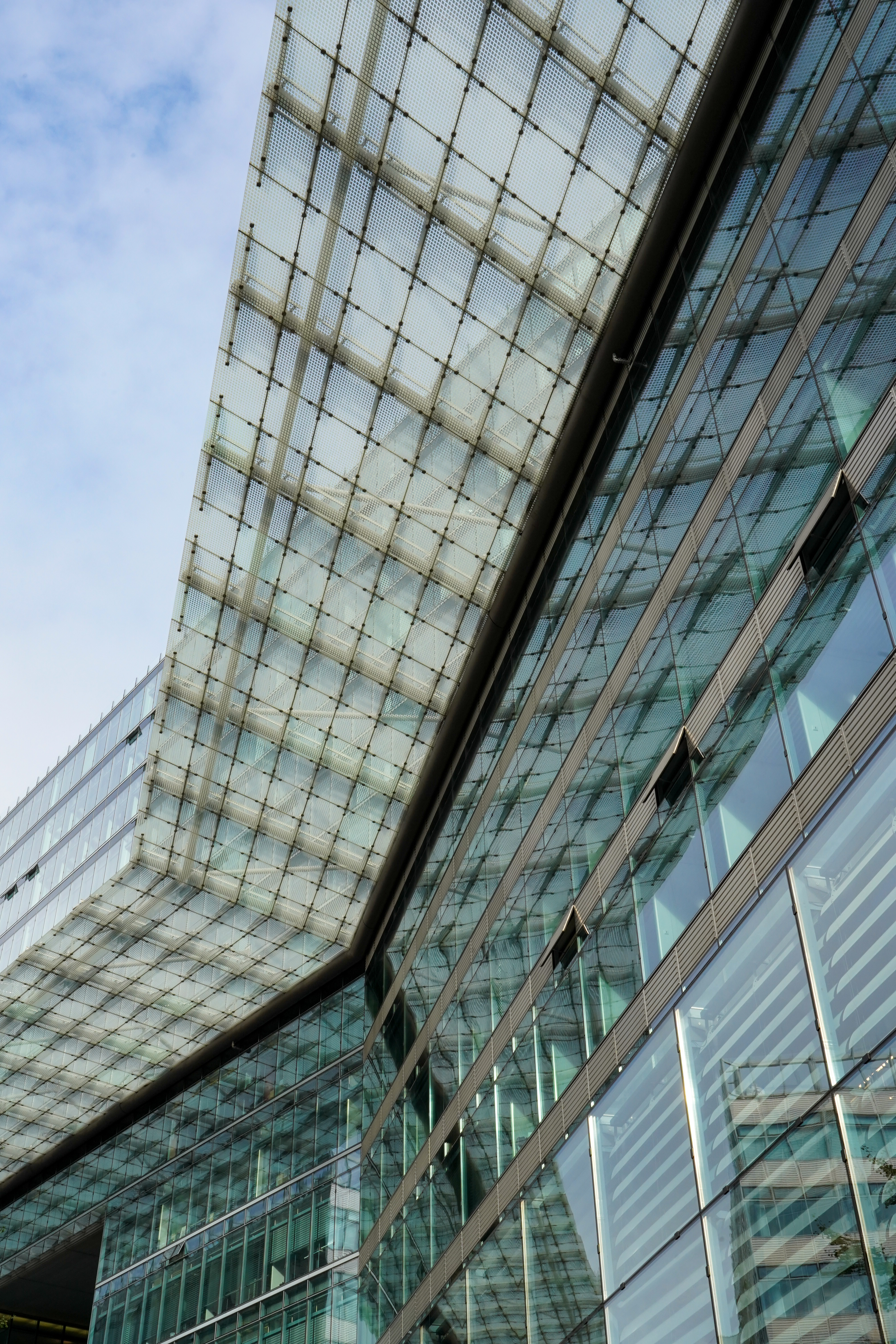
Neues Kranzler Eck, opened in 2000

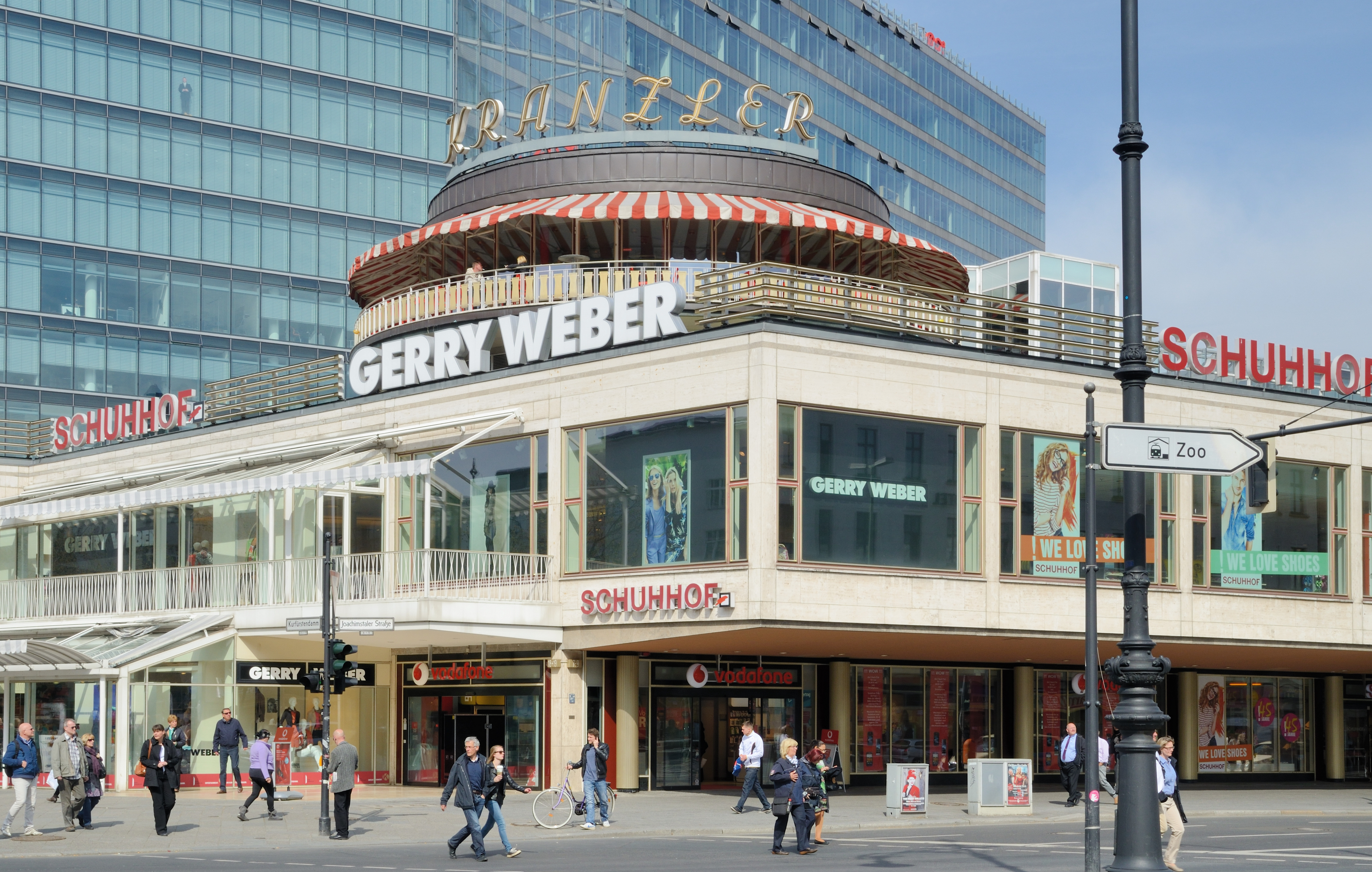
Kranzler-Eck on the corner of Kurfürstendamm and Joachimsthaler Straße, 2013

Refurbished as a coffeehouse according to plans designed by the architect Friedrich August Stüler, the original Café Kranzler was opened in 1834. Including a sun terrace, outside tables on the pavement, an ice-cream parlour and a smokers' room, it swiftly gained the reputation of being one of the city's finest cafés, also after the rivalling Café Bauer opened vis-à-vis in 1877. Café Kranzler was particularly known for its New Year's Eve celebrations that even were broadcast on national radio. In May 1944 the parent house in Mitte was destroyed during the Bombing of Berlin in World War II.

The Charlottenburg branch was opened in 1932, in the rooms of the former Café des Westens on Kurfürstendamm No. 18/19, which ran till the building's destruction in 1945. After the war, the building was reconstructed employing contemporary model designs. However, the renovation disregarded historic features and height limitations of the building. Following the renovations business was resumed at the site in 1951. The current flat-roofed Kranzler-Eck building, with its distinct rotunda and red-white touched awnings, was erected in 1957/58. The Charlottenburg branch, in what was then West Berlin, went on to become a major tourist attraction of the Wirtschaftswunder era.

However, after the fall of the Berlin Wall in 1989, the Café Kranzler fell victim to the massive redevelopment programme which has since then been changing the face of the city. In 2000 business discontinued and the Kranzler re-opened as a small bar in the rotunda on the second floor above the retail premises of a Gerry Weber store, built-in the Neues Kranzler Eck office building and shopping complex designed by Helmut Jahn. Since December 2016, the building’s main tenant is British fashion label Superdry while the cafè is currently leased to local coffee-roasting house The Barn. It now attracts a younger student clientele who enjoy sitting on the floor cushions.
