= Breitscheidplatz =

Square in Berlin, Germany

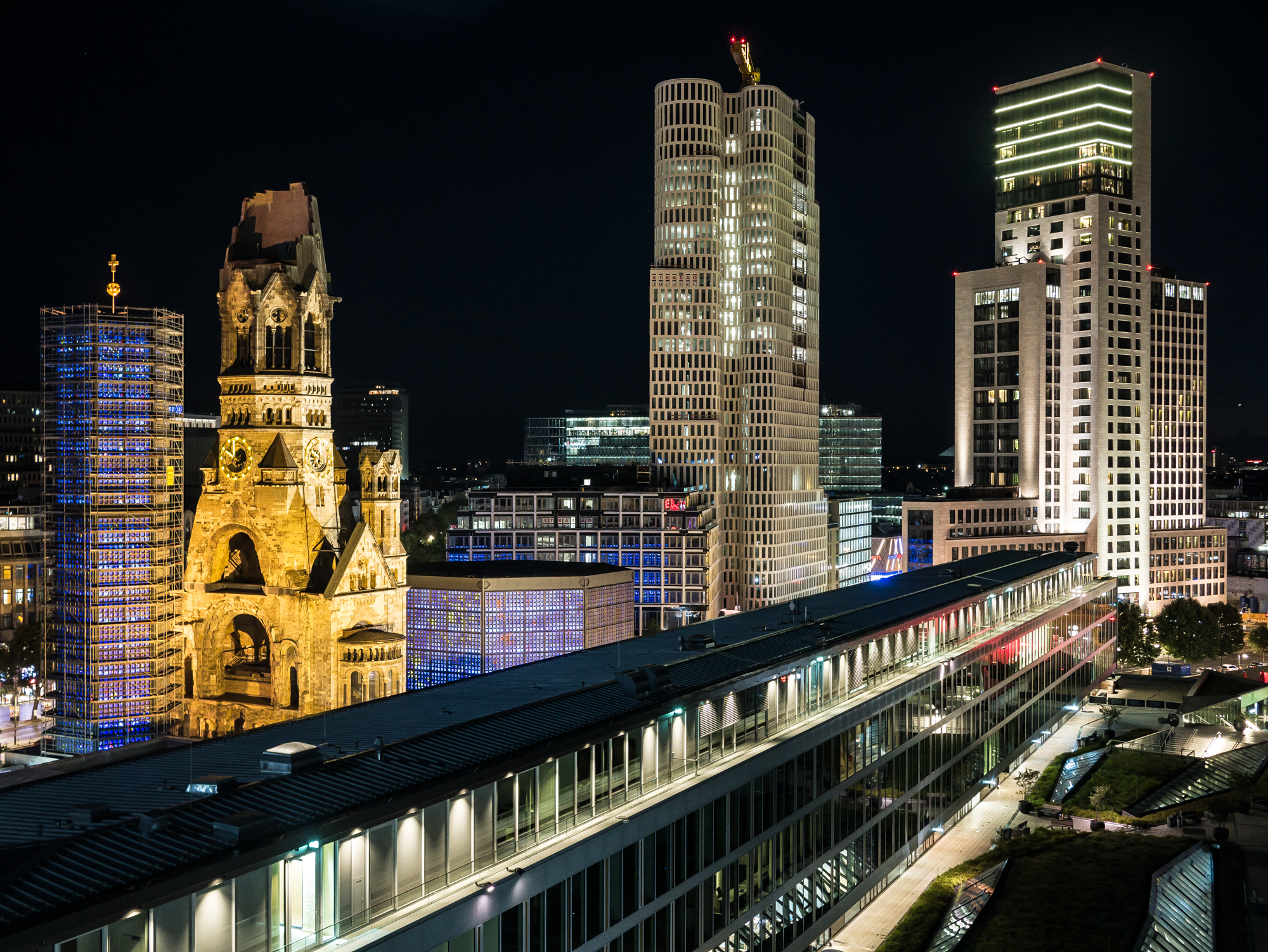
- Breitscheidplatz with Kaiser Wilhelm Memorial Church, Upper West under construction, Zoofenster and Bikini-Haus in 2016
- Interactive map of Breitscheidplatz
- Former names: Gutenbergplatz; (1889–1892); Auguste-Viktoria-Platz; (1892–1947)
- Namesake: Rudolf Breitscheid
- Type: Public square
- Location: Berlin, Germany
- Quarter: Charlottenburg
- Nearest metro station: Kurfürstendamm
- Coordinates: 52°30′17″N 13°20′10″E
- West end: Hardenbergstraße; Kantstraße; Kurfürstendamm
- Major junctions: Rankestraße
- East end: Budapester Straße; Tauentzienstraße

Breitscheidplatz (German pronunciation: [bʁaɪtʃaɪtˌplats]) is a major public square in the inner city of Berlin, Germany. Together with the Kurfürstendamm boulevard, it marks the centre of former West Berlin and the present-day City West. It is named after Rudolf Breitscheid.

== Location ==
Breitscheidplatz lies within the Charlottenburg district near the southwestern tip of the Tiergarten park and the Zoological Garden at the corner of Kurfürstendamm and its eastern continuation, Tauentzienstraße, leading to Schöneberg and the Kaufhaus des Westens on Wittenbergplatz. The Europa-Center mall and highrise closes off the Breitscheidplatz to the east. At its centre is the Kaiser Wilhelm Memorial Church with its damaged spire.

== History ==
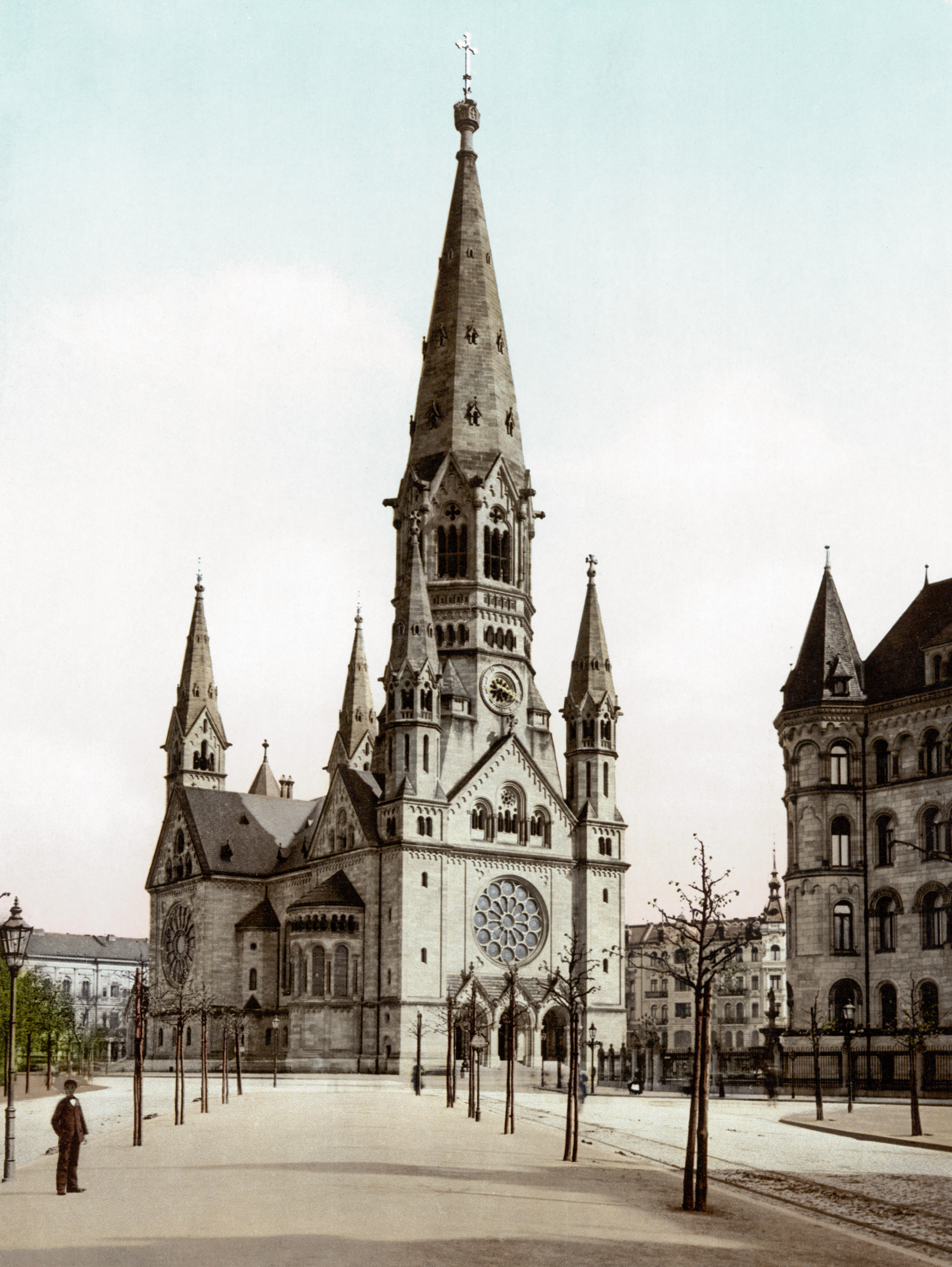
Auguste-Viktoria-Platz seen from Bahnhof Zoo, before 1900

Breitscheidplatz is at the end of the former Kurfürstendamm bridle path of 1542 which led Elector (Kurfürst) Joachim II Hector of Brandenburg to his hunting grounds in the Grunewald forest. In 1889 the square was given the name Gutenbergplatz after Johannes Gutenberg, the designer of the printing press; in 1892 it was renamed Auguste-Viktoria-Platz in honour of the German Empress Augusta Viktoria of Schleswig-Holstein.

Shortly after the square was laid out, Auguste-Viktoria's spouse Emperor Wilhelm II determined it as the site for the Kaiser Wilhelm Memorial Church in honour of his grandfather, Emperor Wilhelm I. The church, designed by royal architect Franz Schwechten, was a prime example of Romanesque Revival architecture. Being a native Rhinelander, Schwechten's design of the church was inspired by the Bonn Minster which Wilhelm II knew quite well as he studied in Bonn. It was consecrated in 1895. Around the square until World War I, further development took place in a similar Neo-Romanesque style, including on the west side the Ausstellungshallen am Zoologischen Garten, an exhibition and event space completed in 1896, and opposite it the 1899 building on the site of today's Europa-Center which after 1916 housed the Romanisches Café. The square was sometimes called the Romanisches Forum (Romanesque Forum) or Romanisches Viertel (Romanesque Quarter) as a result.

=== 20th century ===
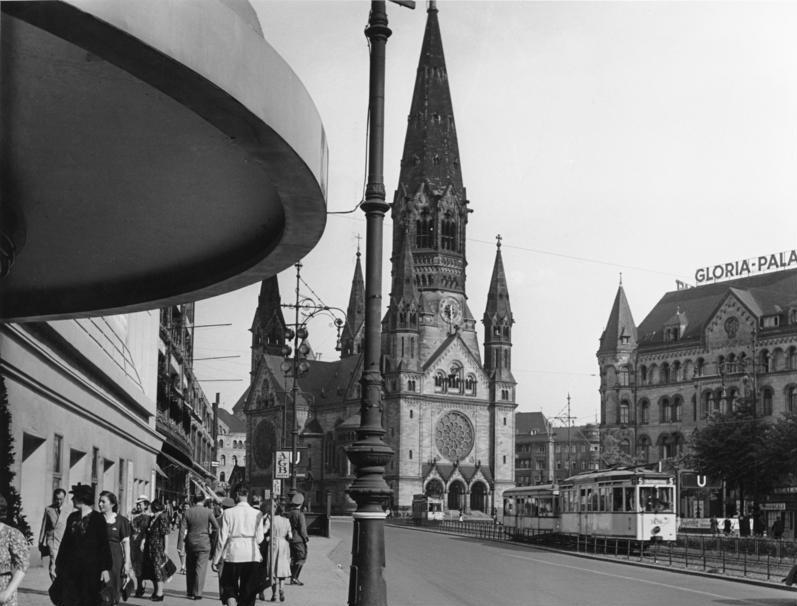
Auguste-Viktoria-Platz and Gloria-Palast cinema, about 1940

After World War I, the square became a meeting place for bohemians and intellectuals in Berlin, particularly at the Romanisches Café, where writers, artists and musicians congregated and exchanged ideas. In addition, cinema and variety theatre development had begun in the area with conversion of part of the exhibition space on the west side. In 1925 the Ufa-Palast am Zoo opened in one of these spaces, then Germany's largest cinema, followed in 1926 by the Gloria-Palast on the western side, where The Blue Angel premièred on 1 April 1930. By 1928, when Joseph Goebbels made a speech attacking the commercial establishments surrounding the Kaiser Wilhelm Memorial Church, the square contained a cluster of Berlin's premier cinemas—Ufa-Palast am Zoo, Gloria-Palast, Capitol, Marmorhaus and Tauntzien-Palast—in addition to cafés, theatres, and other business establishments, and some businessmen had sought to establish it as Berlin's Broadway.

In 1943, the square was heavily bombed and most of the area was destroyed. After World War II the square experienced massive reconstruction when it became the quasi-symbolic centre of West Berlin in compensation for the loss of the historic centre around Alexanderplatz and Unter den Linden in Mitte, then part of East Berlin. In 1947 the square was given the new name 'Breitscheidplatz' after Rudolf Breitscheid, a German Social Democrat who was killed at the Buchenwald concentration camp in 1944.

=== Post-war ===
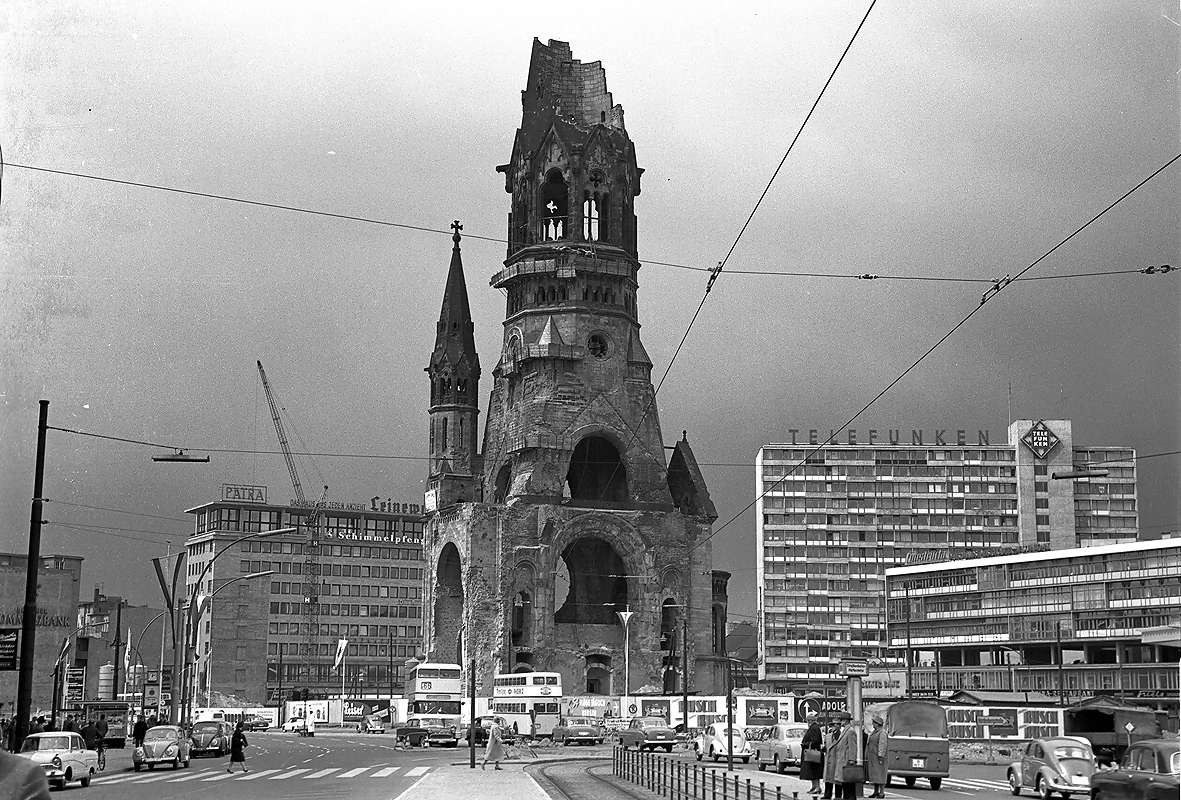
View from Tauentzienstraße, 1960

The Kaiser Wilhelm Memorial Church (informally known as der Hohle Zahn, "the Hollow Tooth", by Berliners) was in shambles after the war. In the 1950s and 1960s the trend in Berlin was to tear down buildings damaged in the war and to build anew. The renowned West German architect Egon Eiermann originally planned to completely demolish the ruins, causing numerous public protests. He then designed a modern parish church and separate belfry, beside which the ruined spire of the old church would be preserved as a memorial. The new Gedächtniskirche was consecrated in 1961 and soon became the architectural pride of West Berlin and a memorial against war and destruction.

The development of the square included the erection of the Zoo Palast cinema replacing the Ufa-Palast am Zoo in 1956, the Bikini-Haus on the northern side finished in 1957 (named after its bare "midriff" on the second floor) and the Schimmelpfeng-Haus built in 1960 (now demolished) on the site of the old Gloria-Palast.

In 1965, the Europa-Center shopping mall was opened by Mayor Willy Brandt on the site of the former Romanisches Café. It included a large cinema complex and an 86 m (282 ft) highrise. The Center with its characteristic Mercedes-Benz star on top became a major business centre and unofficially gave the Breitscheidplatz the reputation of being the commercial hotspot in West Berlin. Today the building still hosts numerous department stores, pavement coffee shops and restaurants and is a popular tourist attraction. It has landmark status.

=== Redevelopment ===
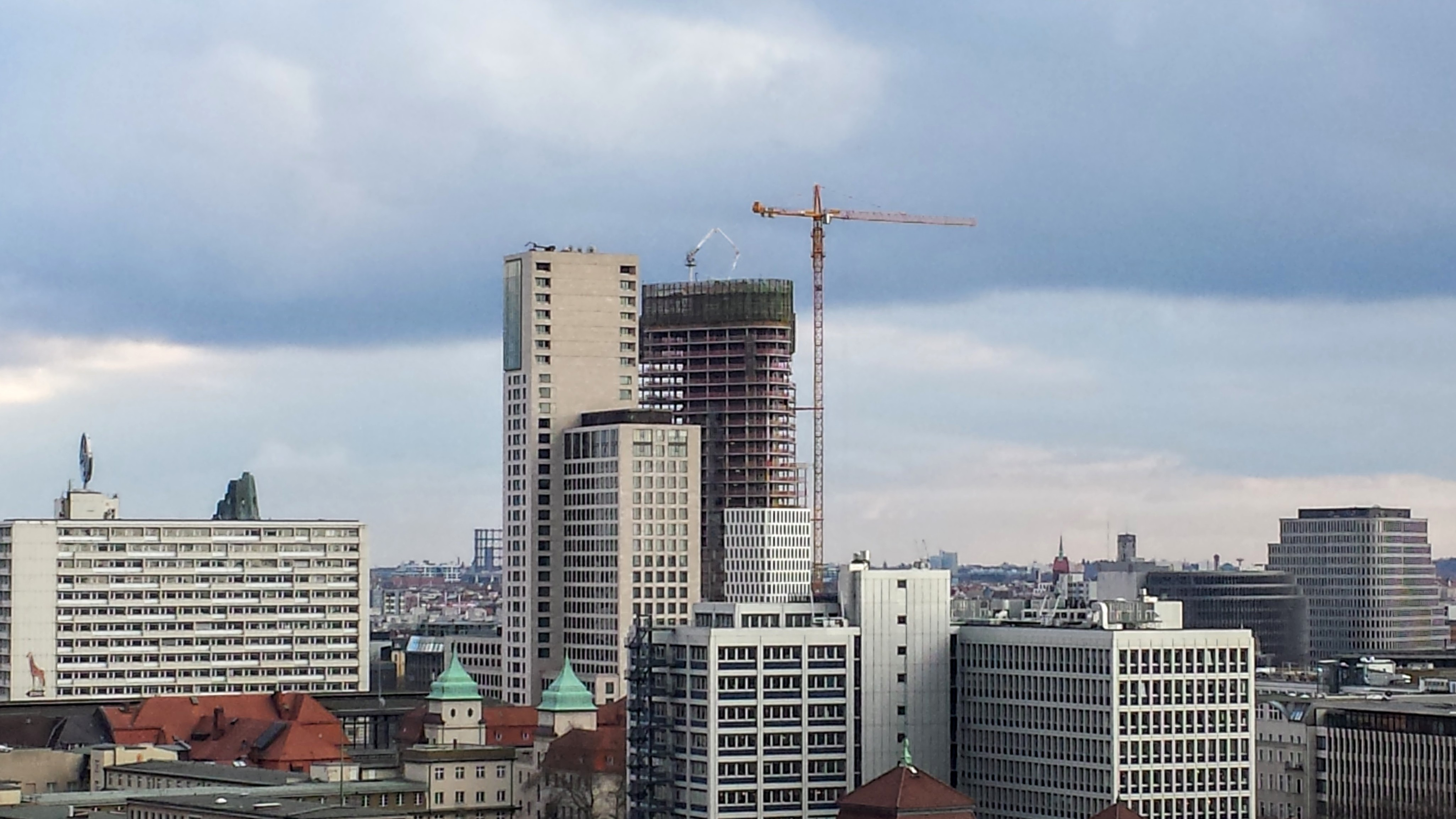
Zoofenster and Upper West construction site, February 2016

The Breitscheidplatz, still one of Berlin's most visited places, is known by many as one of the quintessential squares of Berlin. It presents an awkward yet typical Berlin combination of the old and the new, the cultural and commercial.

Since the turn of the millennium, city plans developed for the Breitscheidplatz include bettering the quality for pedestrians and more public competitions for the future planning of Breitscheidplatz. In 2006, the automobile tunnel on Budapest Street in front of the Bikini-Haus was closed and the pedestrian zone extended. From 2010 to 2014 the Bikini-Haus was refurbished as a shopping mall and a hotel, including the redevelopment of the adjacent Zoo Palast as a multi-screen cinema complex. The destruction of the Schimmelpfeng-Haus began in 2009 to build the 118 m (387 ft) Zoofenster highrise, with offices, restaurants and a Waldorf Astoria hotel, and the neighbouring Upper West tower block, to create an attractive urban area with livable space. Other plans include renovating the bus station on Hardenbergplatz in front of the Bahnhof Zoo and other urban spaces in the vicinity.

=== 2016 Christmas market attack ===
On 19 December 2016, at about 20:00 local time, a truck-ramming attack was made on the Christmas market at Breitscheidplatz, killing thirteen people and injuring 48 others.

In preparation for the Christmas market 2018, the square and its surrounding were fortified against further terrorist attacks.

== Public transport ==
Breitscheidplatz can be reached by S-Bahn via the Zoologischer Garten station (S 5, S 7, S 75, S 9) as well as by U-Bahn via Zoologischer Garten (U 2, U 9) and Kurfürstendamm stations (U 1, U 9). Busses stop at Breitscheidplatz (lines 100 and 200) and Europa-Center (M29, M19).

The Bahnhof Zoo was constructed in 1882 and functioned as the main railway station of West Berlin. Its importance as a major hub diminished when in preparation for the 2006 FIFA World Cup the new Berlin Hauptbahnhof was completed at the site of the former Lehrter Bahnhof; this is now the main train station in Berlin, and the German Intercity-Express and InterCity long-distance trains no longer stop by default at Zoologischer Garten.

== See also ==
- City West

== Sources ==
- http://www.stadtentwicklung.berlin.de 18 May 2006
- Senatsverwaltung für Stadtentwicklung, Berlin (April 2004) "Nachhaltiges Berlin".
- Senatsverwaltung für Stadtentwicklung, Berlin (December 2005) "Stadtforum Berlin".
