= Walter Mehring =

German writer (1896–1981)

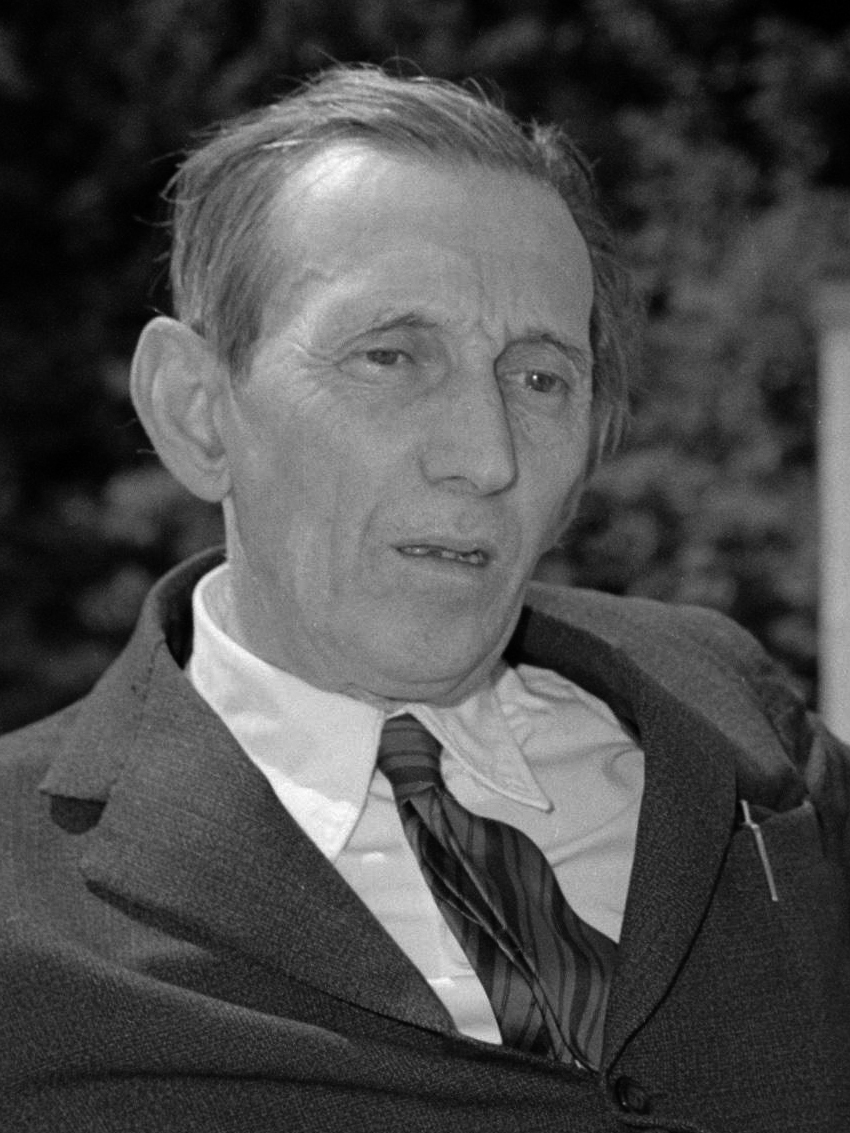
- Mehring in 1964 (Nationaal Archief)
- Born: 29 April 1896; Berlin, Germany
- Died: 6 October 1981; Zurich, Switzerland
- Occupations: Poet, Writer
- Spouse: Marie-Paule Tessier
- Writing career
- Period: Weimar Republic, Exile
- Movement: Dada

Walter Mehring (29 April 1896 – 3 October 1981) was a German author and one of the most prominent satirical authors in the Weimar Republic. He was banned during the Third Reich and fled the country.

== Early life ==
Mehring was Jewish, the son of the translator and writer Sigmar Mehring and Hedwig Löwenstein, an opera singer from Prague who later was deported to Theresienstadt by the Nazis and perished there. His literary career began with the Sturm and Berliner Dada movements.

== Early writings ==
From the 1920s, he published lyric poetry and satirical prose in various magazines and newspapers such as the famous Weltbühne or Das Tage-Buch. He fought against militarism and antisemitism and considered himself an anarchist. He also wrote songs for some of the best cabarets in Berlin: Max Reinhardt's Schall und Rauch, Rosa Valetti's Café Größenwahn and for Trude Hesterberg's Wilde Bühne. Artists like George Grosz became close friends. From 1921 to 1928, he lived and worked in Paris.

== Persecution ==
He was persecuted by the Nazis, particularly by Joseph Goebbels, and consequently fled the country. On 10 May 1933 his books were burnt during the Nazi book burnings.

Mehring emigrated to Vienna, where he met the actress and writer Hertha Pauli. She was his companion during his escape from the Nazis through France. He dedicated his "Briefe zur Mitternacht" ("Midnight Letters") to her. The period spent in France he also described in No Road Back. When the Nazis occupied France, he was briefly imprisoned in an internment camp. He managed to escape and, together with Hertha Pauli, he wandered around France, meeting many other people on the run from the Nazis: Franz Werfel, Alma Mahler-Werfel, Heinrich Mann, Leonhard Frank, Emil Gumbel. In Marseille they met Varian Fry (Emergency Rescue Committee), who helped them escape.

== Exile ==
He emigrated to the United States. With the aid of the European Film Fund he got employment with Metro-Goldwyn-Mayer. He also wrote articles for Aufbau and became a naturalized US citizen, but never really managed to settle in the United States and returned to Europe after the war.

In Europe, he was unable to replicate his earlier successes. In 1981 he died in Zurich.

== Selected works ==
- The Lost Library: The Autobiography of a Culture. Secker & Warburg, 1951.
- Timoshenko: Marshal of the Red Army. A. Unger, 1942.
- No Road Back. S. Curl, 1944.

== See also ==
- Anarchism in Germany
- List of authors banned during the Third Reich
- Transatlantic (portrayal in 2023 TV series)

== Critics ==
- Boyle, Kay: The Poetry of Walter Mehring; NO ROAD BACK, Poems by Walter Mehring, in the German text as well as English translation by S.A. de Witt. In: New York Times, 03.09.1944.
- Mehring, Walter (6 October 1981). "Walter Mehring, 85, Writer; His Sarcasm Enraged Nazis". The New York Times.
- Politzer, Heinz: "The Lost Library, by Walter Mehring." In Commentary Magazine, September 1951. http://www.commentarymagazine.com/viewarticle.cfm/the-lost-library--by-walter-mehring-1343

== Literature ==
- Allen, Roy F.: Literary Life in German Expressionism and the Berlin Circles. UMI Research Press, 1983.
- Thomson, Philip John: The Grotesque in German Poetry, 1880–1933. Hawthorn Press, 1975.
- Spalek, John M./Bell, Robert F.: Exile, the Writer's Experience, University of North Carolina Press, 1982.
