= Romanisches Café =

Cafe-bar in Berlin

Coordinates: 52.5053°N 13.3345°E

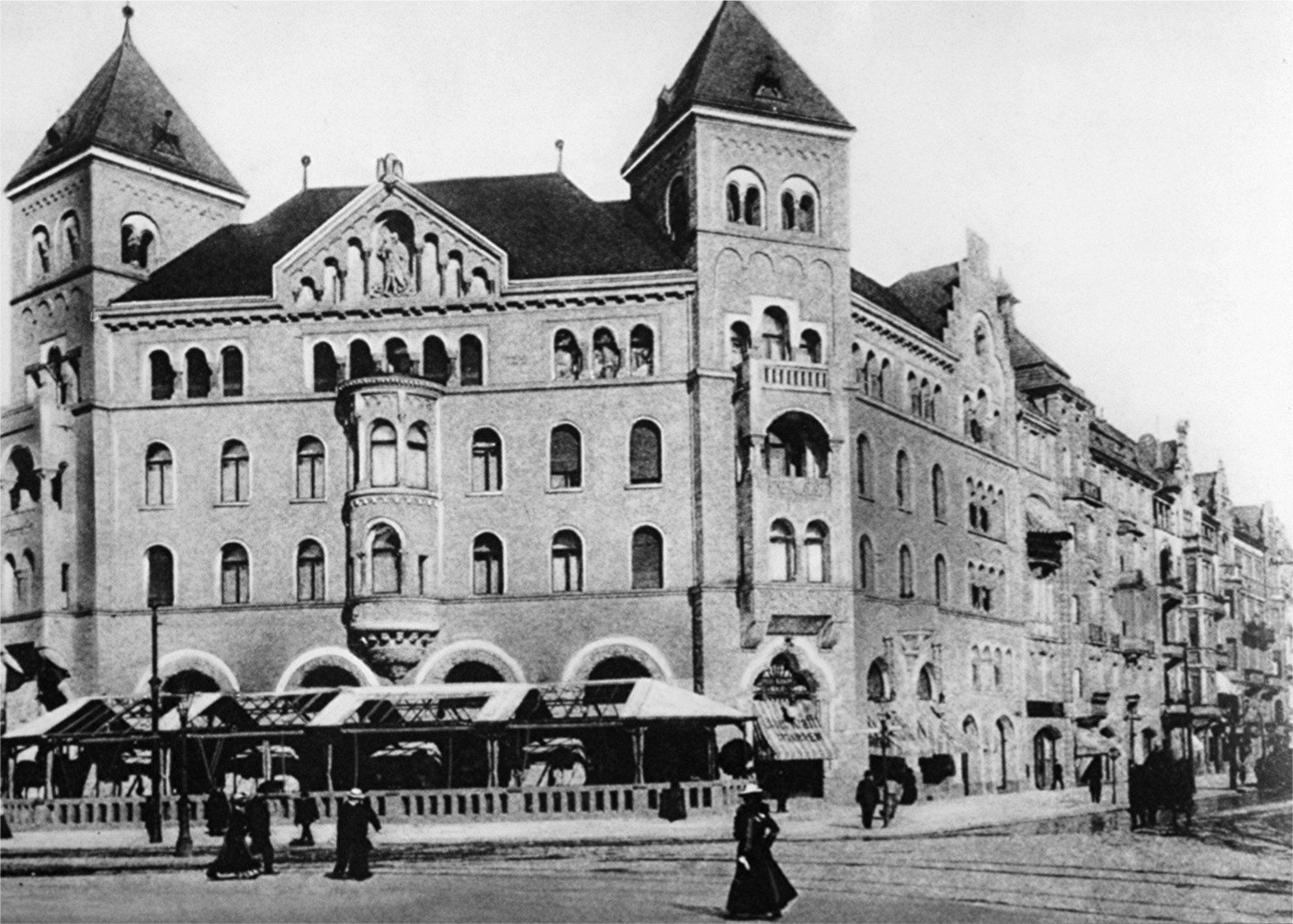
Romanisches Haus, about 1900

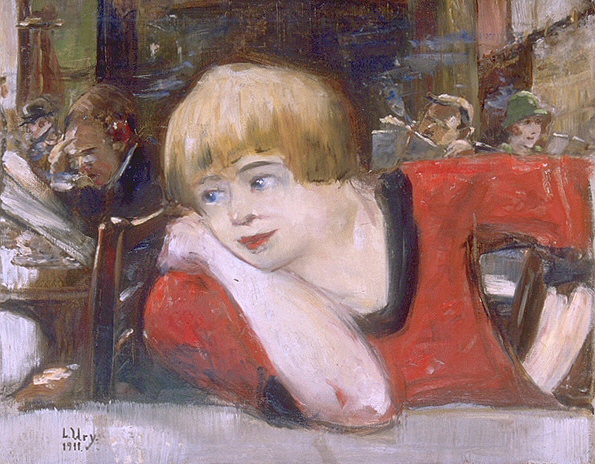
Lesser Ury: Mädchen im Romanischen Café, 1911

The Romanisches Café ("Romanesque Café") was a café-bar in Berlin known as a meeting place for artists. It was located in what is now Breitscheidplatz at the end of the Kurfürstendamm in the Charlottenburg district (although that section of the Kurfürstendamm was renamed Budapester Straße in 1925). The name was derived from the Neo-Romanesque style of the building.

== History ==
The Romanisches Café was situated in the Romanisches Haus, which was erected between 1897 and 1899 to a design by Franz Schwechten, who had also built the Kaiser Wilhelm Memorial Church located opposite. The house, equipped with two towers, stood at the eastern corner of Auguste-Viktoria-Platz (today Breitscheidplatz), approximately on the site of the present-day Europa-Center. It was initially the location of the Hotel Kaiserhof's patisserie; the café did not open until 1916. Since the old Café des Westens (another artists' haunt) had shut in 1915, it quickly developed into the most important artists' cafe in Berlin, particularly after the end of the First World War.

The café was a meeting place for the intelligentsia, a place at which the leading writers, painters, actors, directors, journalists and critics of the day consorted. At the same time it became a place for budding artists, who would try to start their careers by establishing their first contacts here. The already established artists, for their part, would group into séparées in an attempt to distinguish themselves from the mass of talent.

Towards the end of the Weimar Republic, as the political situation in Germany became more violent, the Romanisches Café gradually lost its role. As early as 1927 the Nazis instigated a riot on the Kurfürstendamm during which the café, as a meeting place for the left-wing intellectuals they hated, was among the targets of violence. The coming to power of the Nazi Party and the subsequent emigration of most of its regulars signalled the final end of the café as an artists' haunt. The Romanisches Haus was completely destroyed by an Allied air-raid in 1943.

== Renowned regulars ==
- David Bergelson
- Bertolt Brecht
- Otto Dix
- Alfred Döblin
- Hanns Eisler
- Etta Federn
- George Grosz
- Sylvia von Harden
- Mascha Kaléko
- Erich Kästner
- Alfred Kerr
- Irmgard Keun
- Arthur Kronfeld
- Else Lasker-Schüler
- Hugo Lederer
- Franz Pfemfert
- Erich Maria Remarque
- Joachim Ringelnatz
- Joseph Roth
- Abraham Nahum Stencl
- Ernst Toller
- Kurt Tucholsky
- Konrad Wachsmann
- Franz Werfel
- Billy Wilder
