= City West =

Area of Berlin, Germany

Coordinates: 52.5047°N 13.3353°E

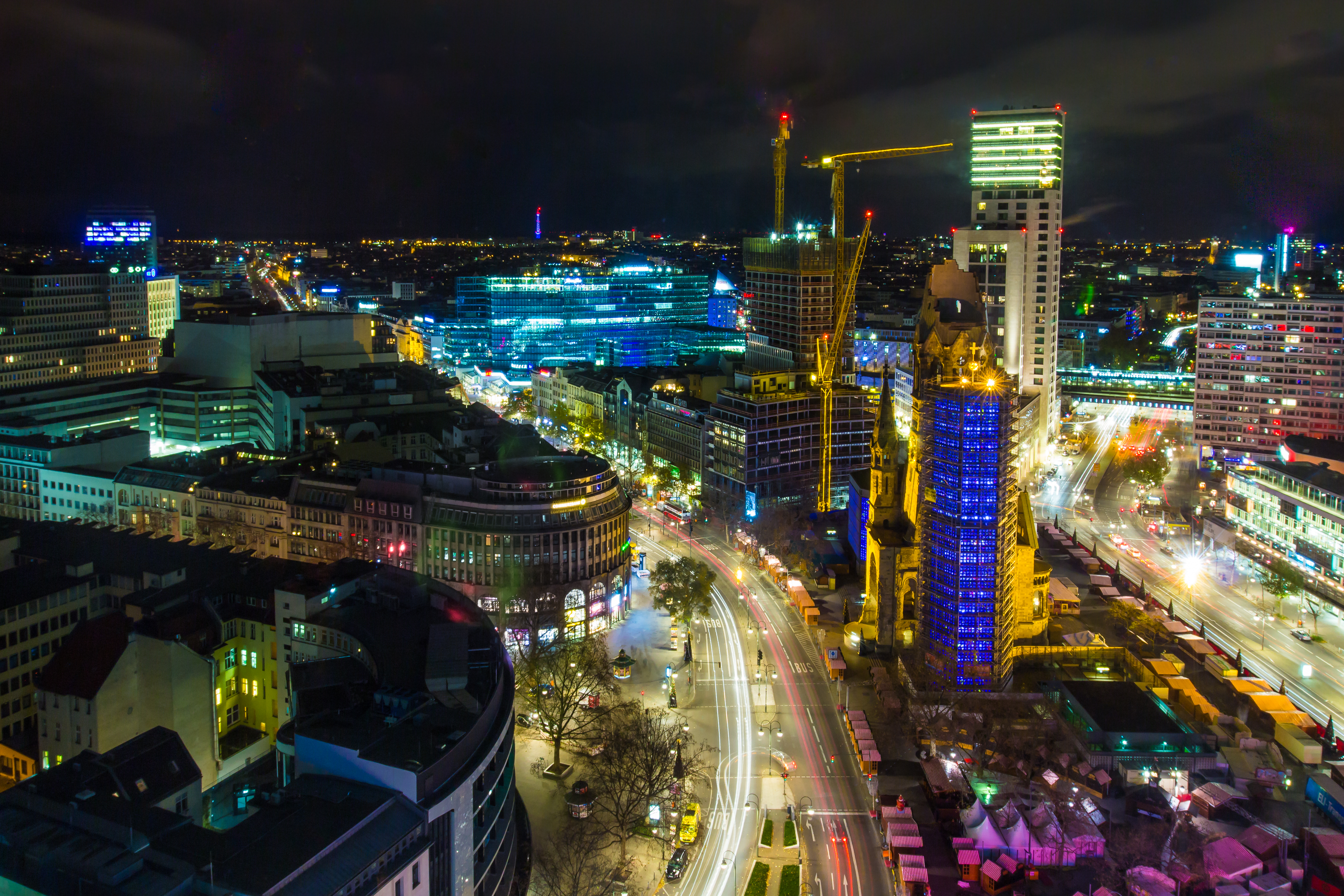
Christmas Market at the Kaiser Wilhelm Memorial Church (2015)

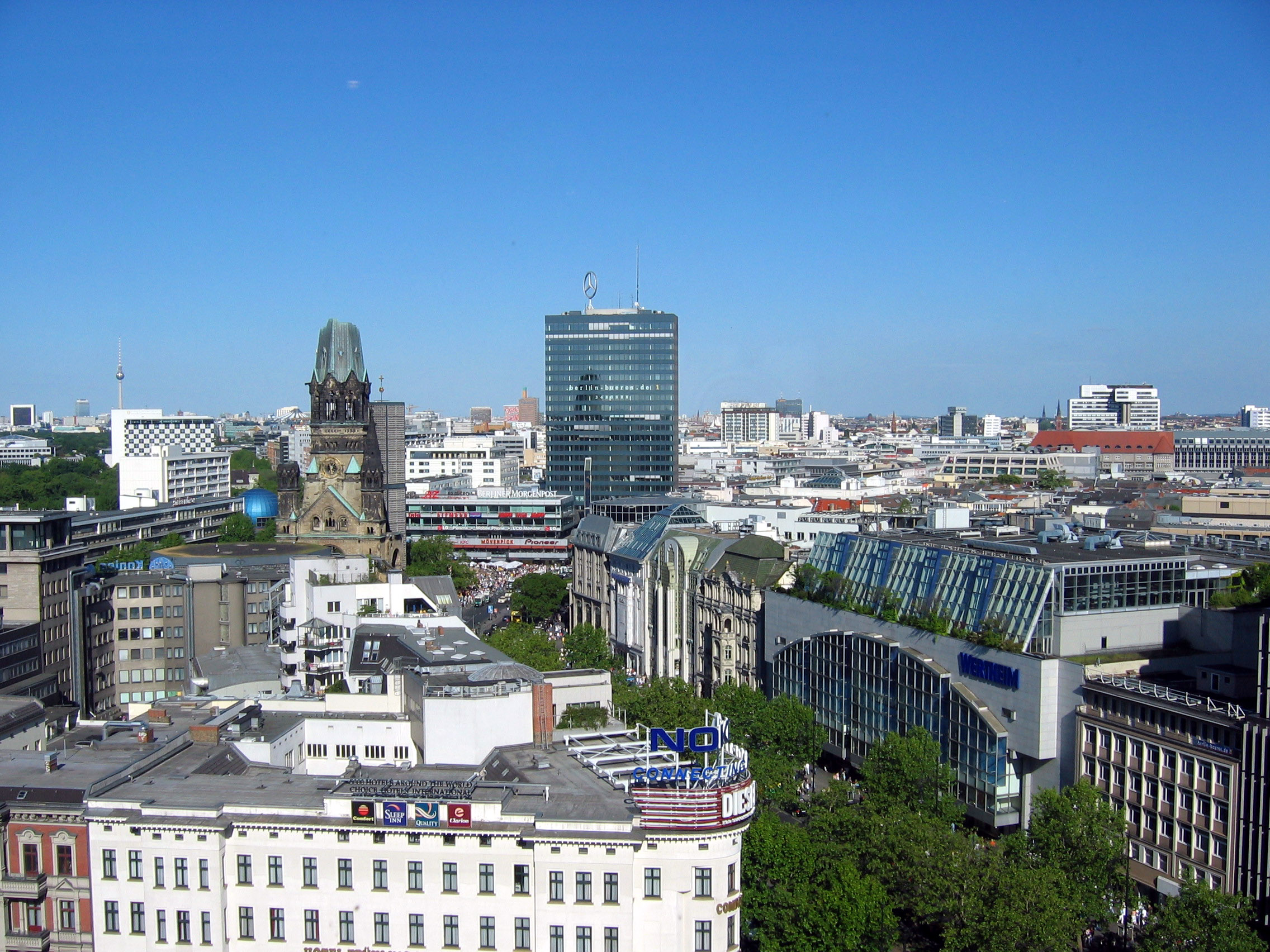
View of KuDamm in 2003

City West (formerly known as Neuer Westen ("New West") or Zooviertel ("Zoo Quarter")) is an area in the western part of central Berlin. It is one of Berlin's main commercial areas, and was the commercial centre of former West Berlin when the city was divided by the Berlin Wall.

== Geography ==
The area stretches from the localities of Charlottenburg and Wilmersdorf in the west to Schöneberg and Tiergarten in the east. It is located southwest of the central Mitte locality and the Großer Tiergarten park, along Kurfürstendamm and Tauentzienstraße, two leading shopping streets meeting at Breitscheidplatz, where the landmark of the ruined Kaiser Wilhelm Memorial Church rises.

The major part belongs to the Charlottenburg-Wilmersdorf borough, while the eastern half of Tauentzienstraße with the famous Kaufhaus des Westens (KaDeWe) department store on Wittenbergplatz belongs to Tempelhof-Schöneberg. The adjacent streets of Tiergarten in the northeast since 2001 are part of the Mitte borough.

== History ==
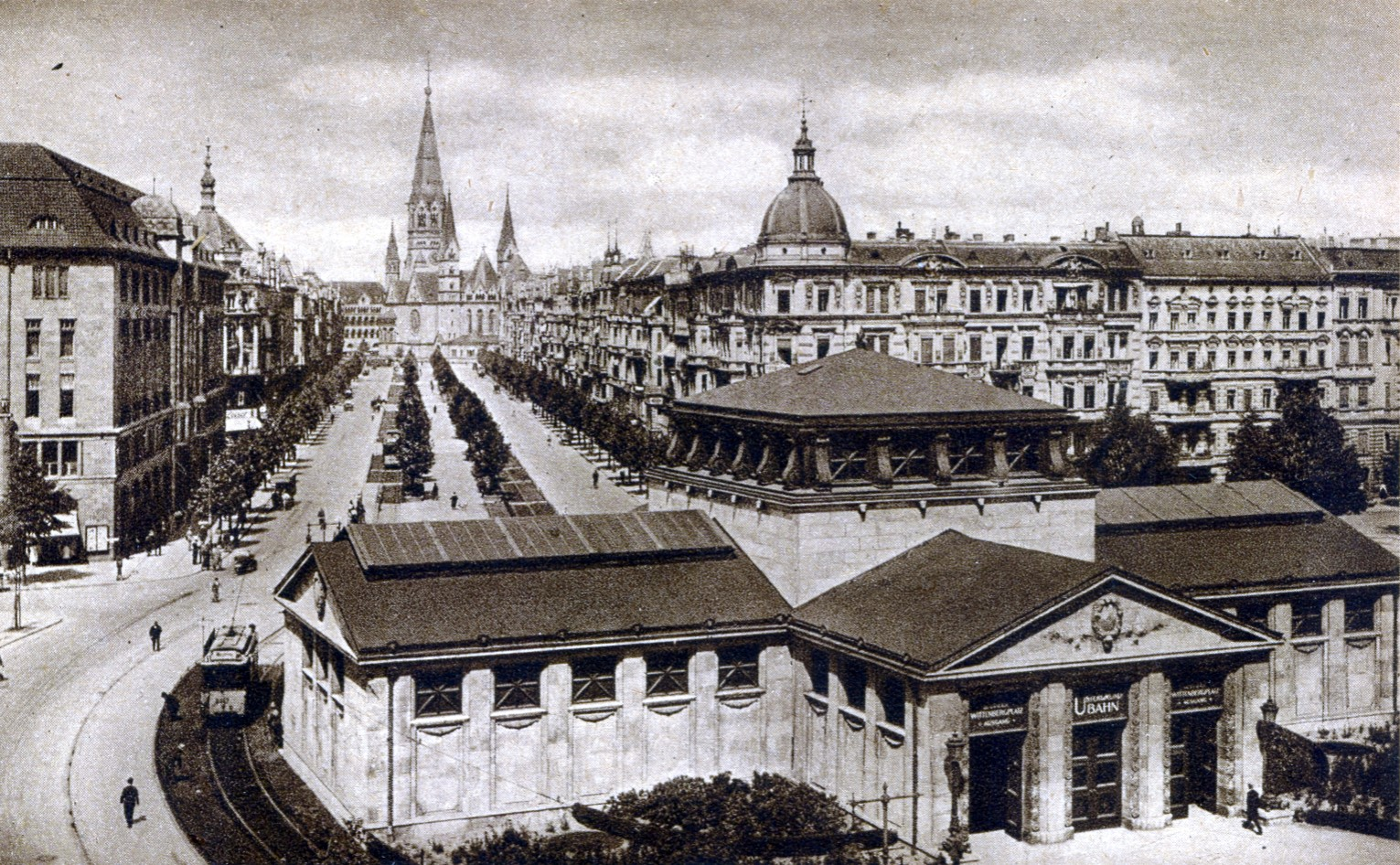
Tauentzienstraße around 1915

City West started developing in the Wilhelmine era from about 1895 onwards as a commercial and entertainment centre of the German Empire's capital, in addition to the historical centre in Mitte. At that time, Charlottenburg, Schöneberg and Wilmersdorf still were towns in their own right, rivalling with Berlin for locational advantages. The KaDeWe opened in 1907 competed with the Wertheim and Tietz department stores on Leipziger Straße in Mitte. Likewise, the Theater des Westens opened in 1896 or the Romanisches Café from 1916 were newly established cultural institutions.

In the time of the Weimar Republic after World War I, the New West incorporated by the 1920 Greater Berlin Act became synonymous to the Golden Twenties. Large cinemas like the Ufa-Palast am Zoo opened, then the main locations of German film, accompanied by a lively variety and Kabarett scene, while in 1928 Max Reinhardt took over the Kurfürstendamm theatres in the rooms of the former Berlin Secession. Shortly afterwards, first antisemitic encroachments occurred on Jewish residents and shopkeepers, culminating in the Kristallnacht pogrom of 1938.

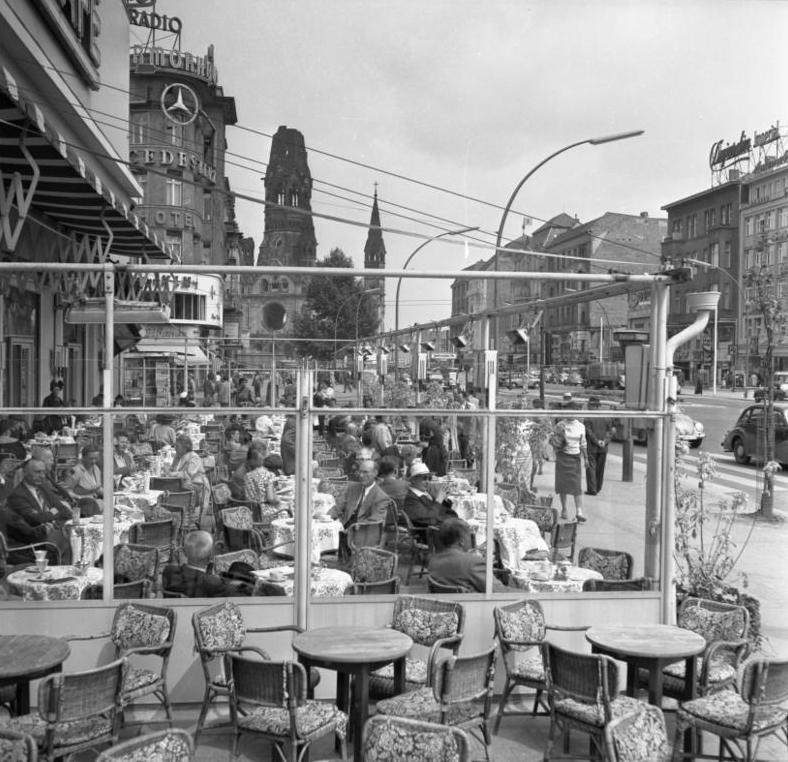
Café Kranzler, 1955

After World War II and the division of Germany the area around the Zoologischer Garten railway station developed to the West Berlin city centre in the Cold War era. The process was reinforced by the building of the Berlin Wall in 1961, followed by the opening of the Europa-Center high-rise on Breitscheidplatz two years later. After the German reunification in 1990, the central administrative functions of reunified Berlin are today again located in Mitte. Nevertheless, City West has struggled to maintain its status as "second centre" and one of the main commercial areas of the city beside Alexanderplatz, Friedrichstraße and Potsdamer Platz, stressing its distinct boulevard character and the exclusive range of items. Recent building projects like the Zoofenster document these efforts.
