= Kurfürstendamm =

Street avenue in Berlin, Germany

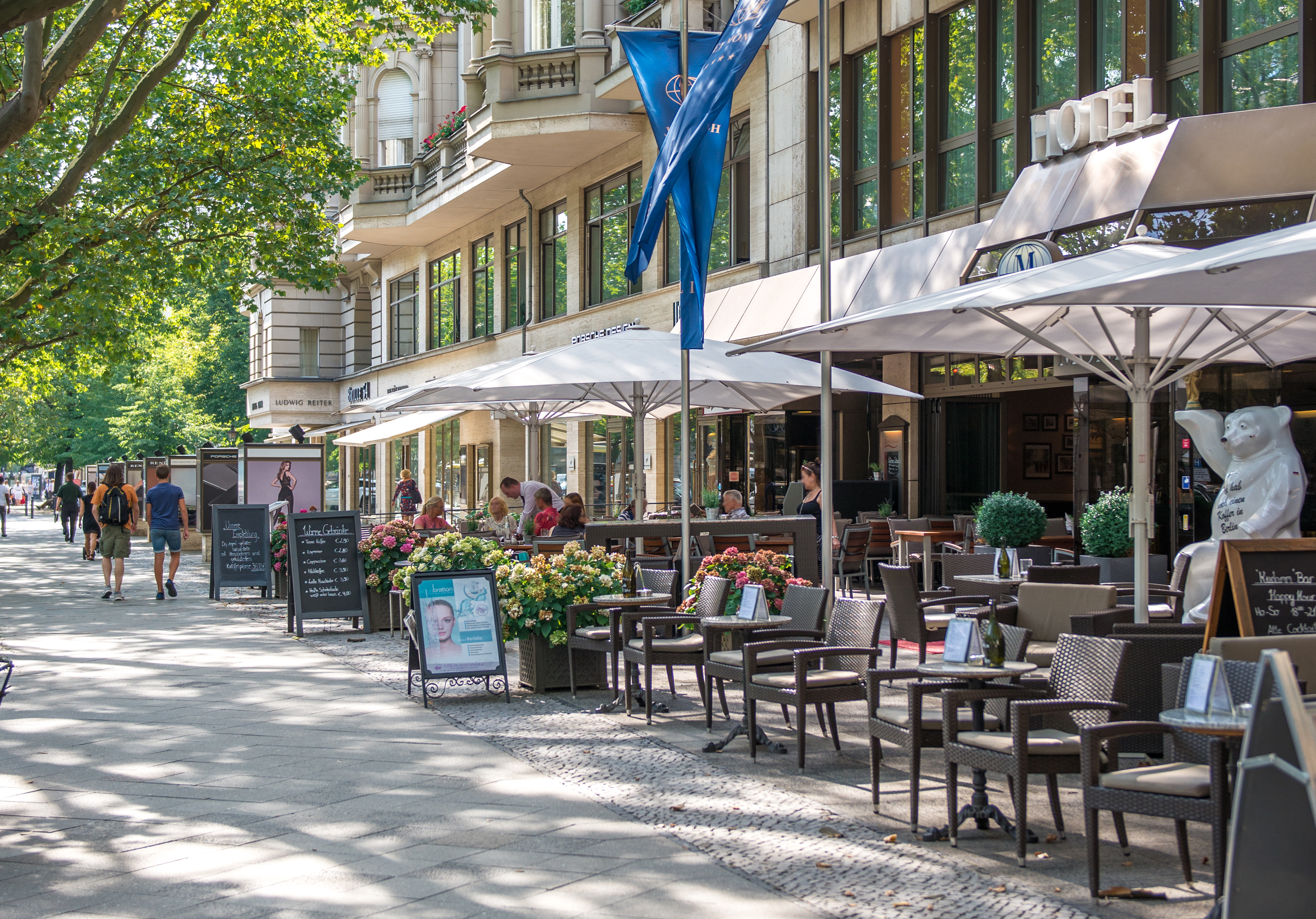
- Restaurants on the Kurfürstendamm
- Interactive map of Kurfürstendamm
- Former names: (unnamed); (1542–c. 1767); Churfürsten Damm; (by c. 1767)
- Namesake: Joachim II Hector, Prince-elector of Brandenburg
- Type: Avenue / Boulevard
- Length: 3,500 m (11,500 ft)
- Width: 53 m (174 ft)
- Location: Berlin, Germany
- Quarter: Charlottenburg, Wilmersdorf, Halensee, Grunewald
- Nearest metro station: Kurfürstendamm; Uhlandstraße; Adenauerplatz; Halensee
- Coordinates: 52°30′03″N 13°18′46″E
- East end: Tauentzienstraße; Breitscheidplatz
- Major junctions: Rankestraße; Joachimsthaler Platz; Joachimsthaler Straße; Fasanenstraße; Uhlandstraße; George-Grosz-Platz; Olivaer Platz; Leibnizstraße; Adenauerplatz; Lewishamstraße; Brandenburgische Straße; Lehniner Platz; Agathe-Lasch-Platz; Joachim-Friedrich-Straße; Henriettenplatz
- West end: Rathenauplatz; Hubertusallee

Construction
- Inauguration: 1542

The Kurfürstendamm (German pronunciation: [ˌkuːɐ̯fʏʁstn̩ˈdam]; colloquially Ku'damm, [ˈkuːdam]; English: Prince Elector Embankment) is one of the most famous avenues in Berlin. The street takes its name from the former Kurfürsten (prince-electors) of Brandenburg. The broad, long boulevard can be considered the Champs-Élysées of Berlin and is lined with shops, houses, hotels and restaurants. In particular, many fashion designers have their shops there, as well as several car manufacturers' show rooms.

== Description ==
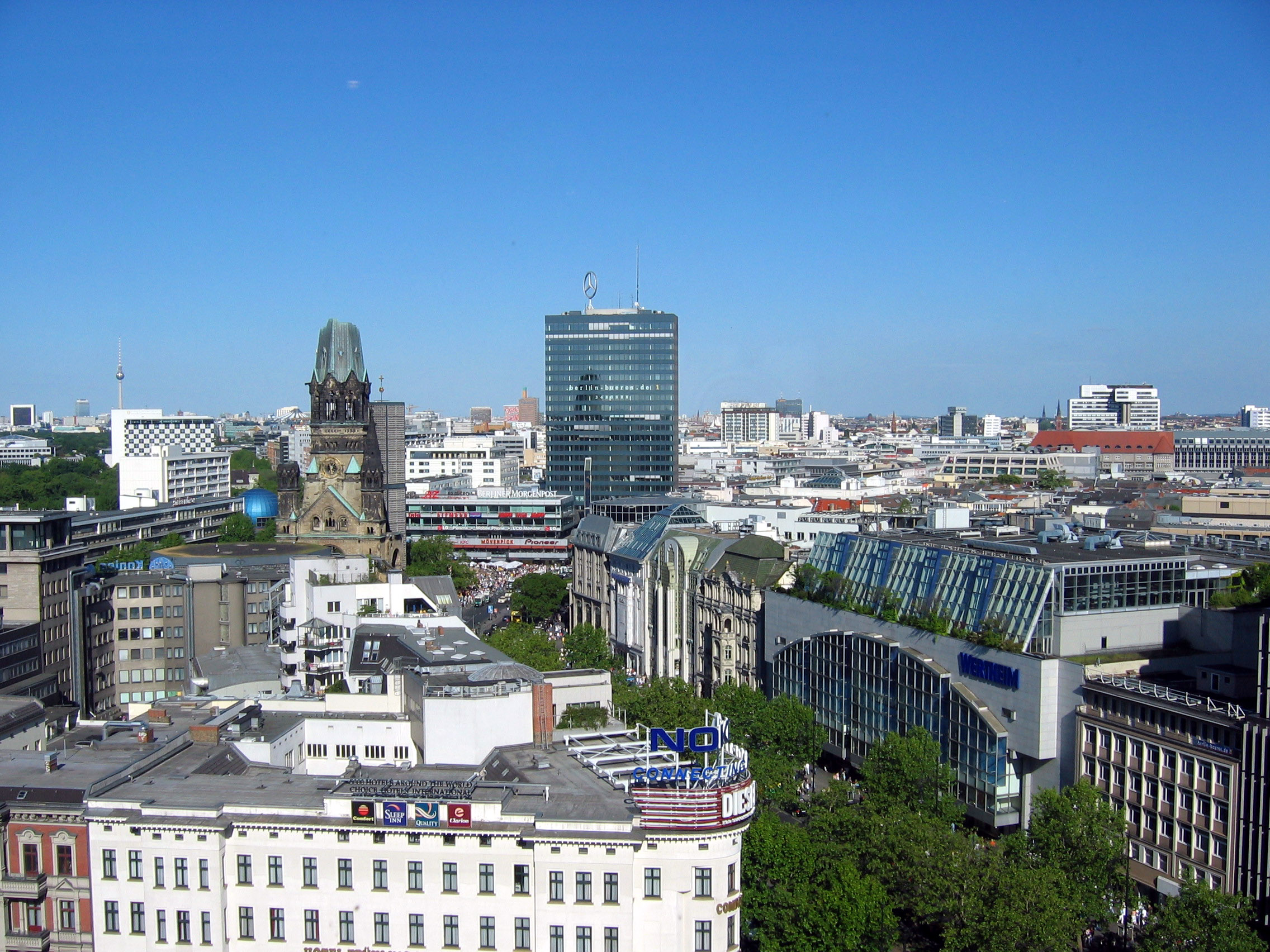
View over Kurfürstendamm

The avenue includes four lines of plane trees and runs for 3.5 km (2.2 mi) through the city. It branches off from the Breitscheidplatz, where the ruins of the Kaiser Wilhelm Memorial Church stand, and leads southwestward up to the district of Grunewald.

At the junction with Joachimstaler Straße it passes the Café Kranzler, successor of the Café des Westens, a famous venue for artists and bohémiens of the pre–World War I era. The Kurfürstendamm U-Bahn station and the Swissôtel Berlin can be found at the same junction. One block farther, near Uhlandstraße U-Bahn station, is the Hotel Bristol Berlin (formerly Kempinski) hotel as well as the Theater am Kurfürstendamm, at the site of a former exhibition hall of the Berlin Secession art association.

At Adenauerplatz the boulevard reaches the district of Wilmersdorf, where it passes the Schaubühne theatre on Lehniner Platz. The more sober western or "upper" end of the Kurfürstendamm is marked by the Berlin-Halensee railway station on the Ringbahn line and the junction with the Bundesautobahn 100 (Stadtring) at the Rathenauplatz roundabout, featuring the long-disputed 1987 "Beton Cadillacs" sculpture by Wolf Vostell.

Luxury Boutiques Kurfürstendamm

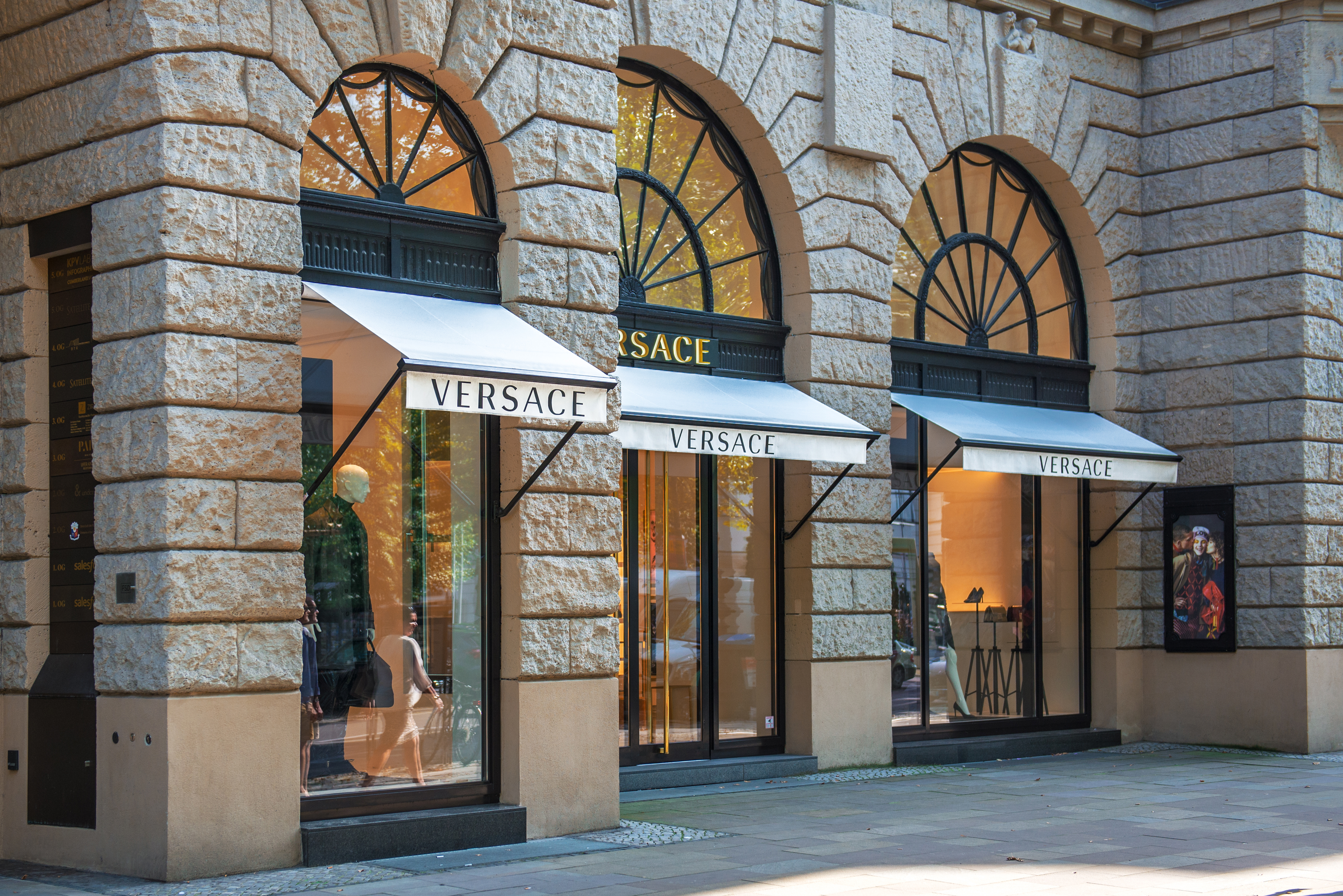
Versace Boutique

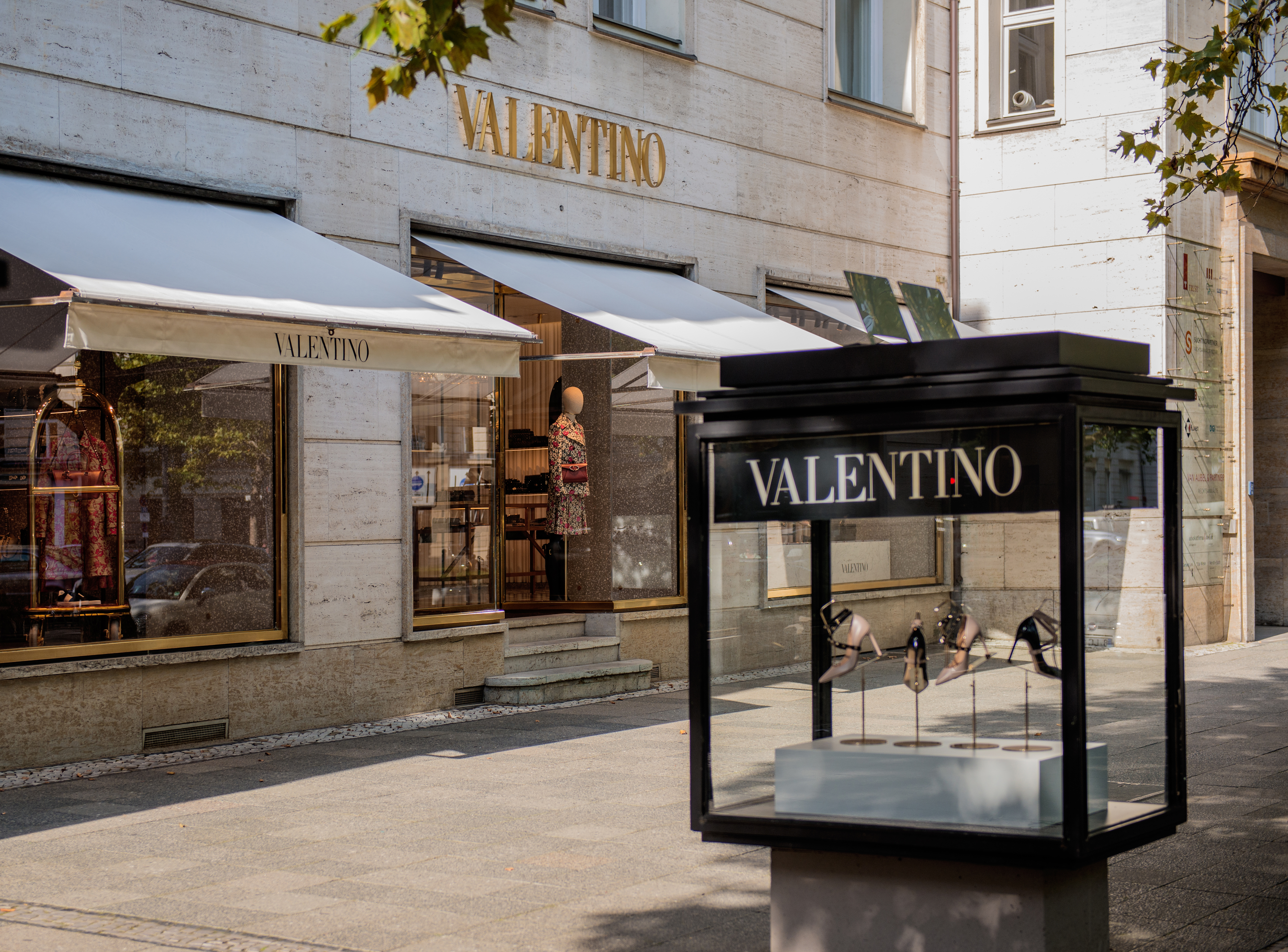
Valentino

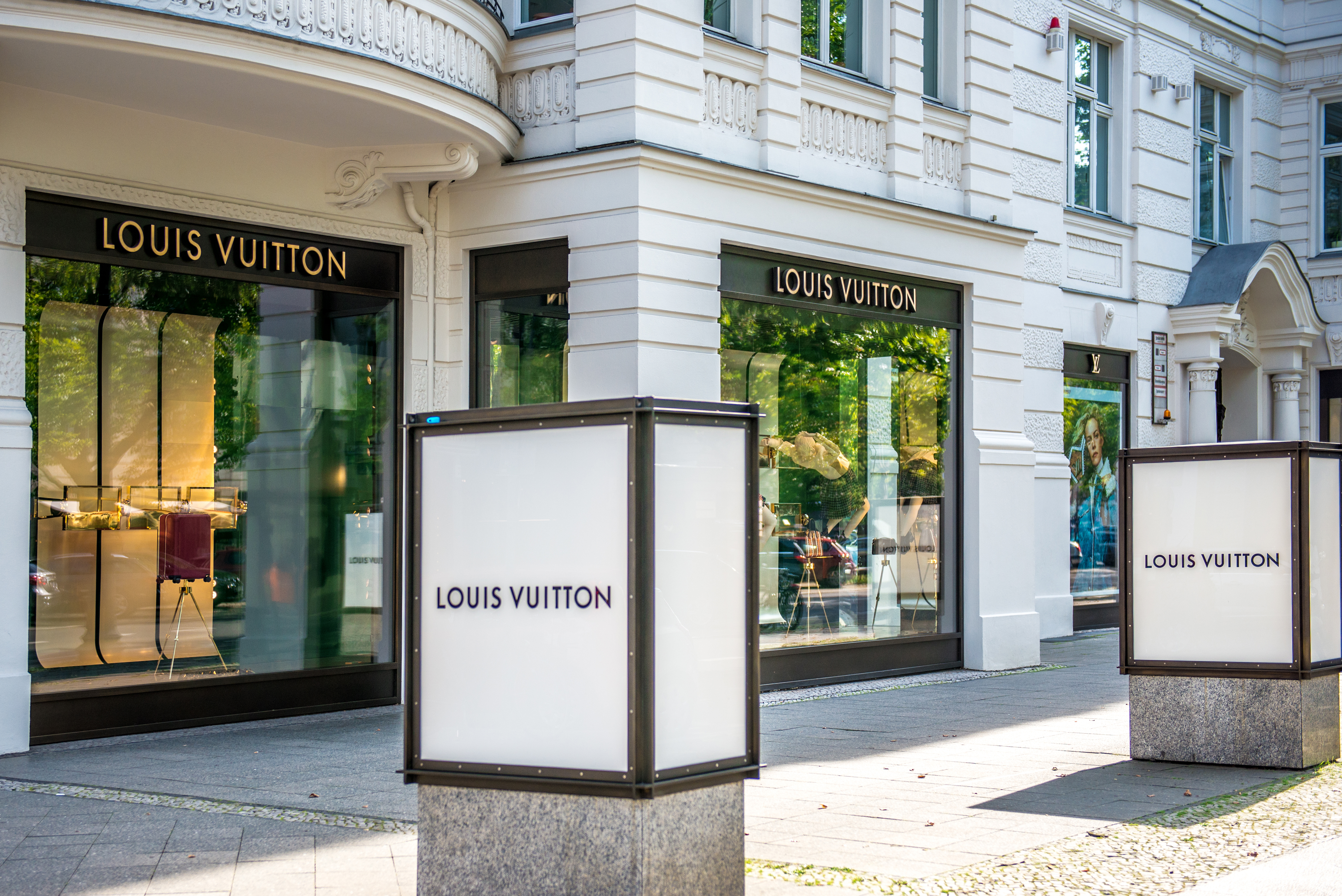
Louis Vuitton Berlin

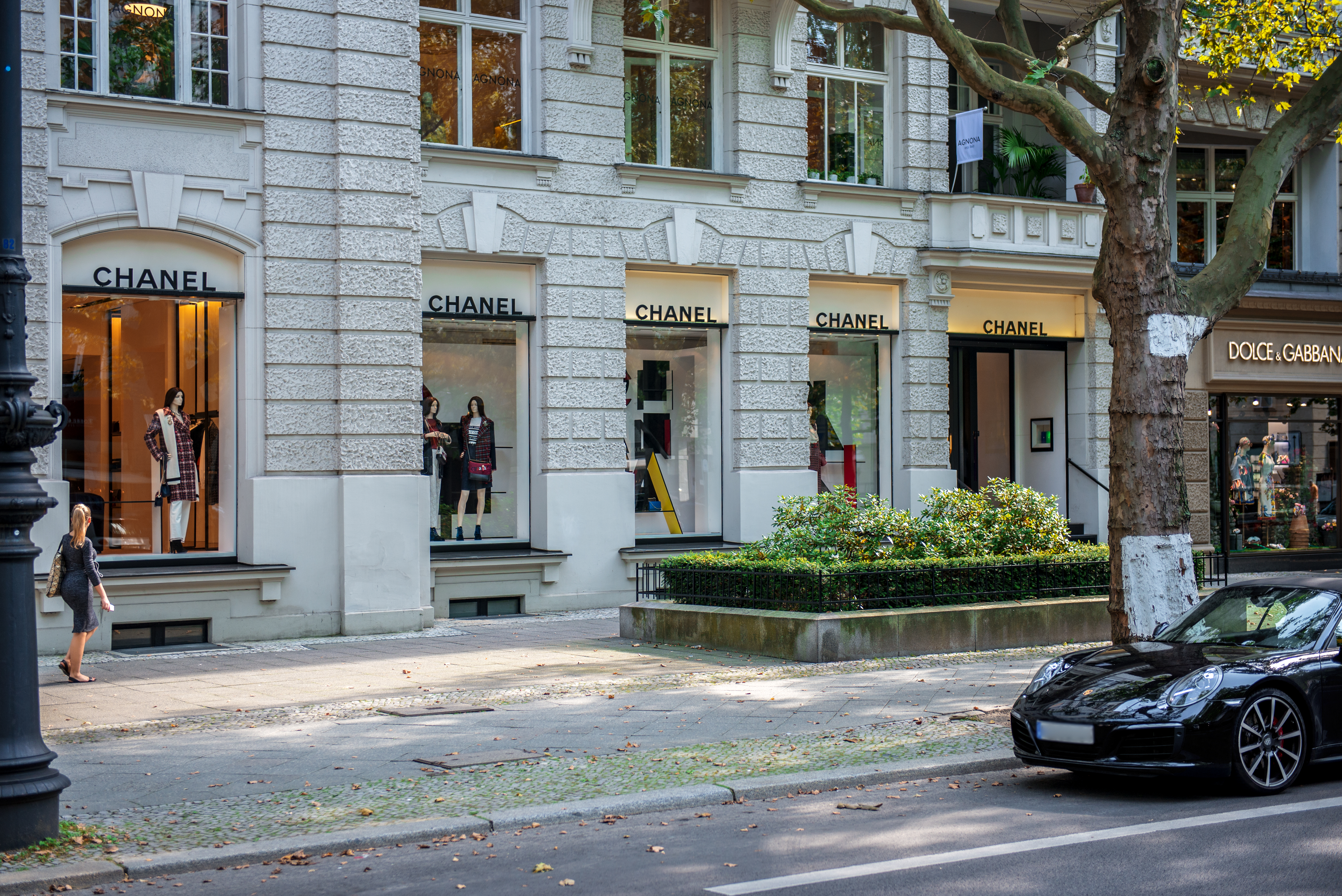
Chanel Berlin

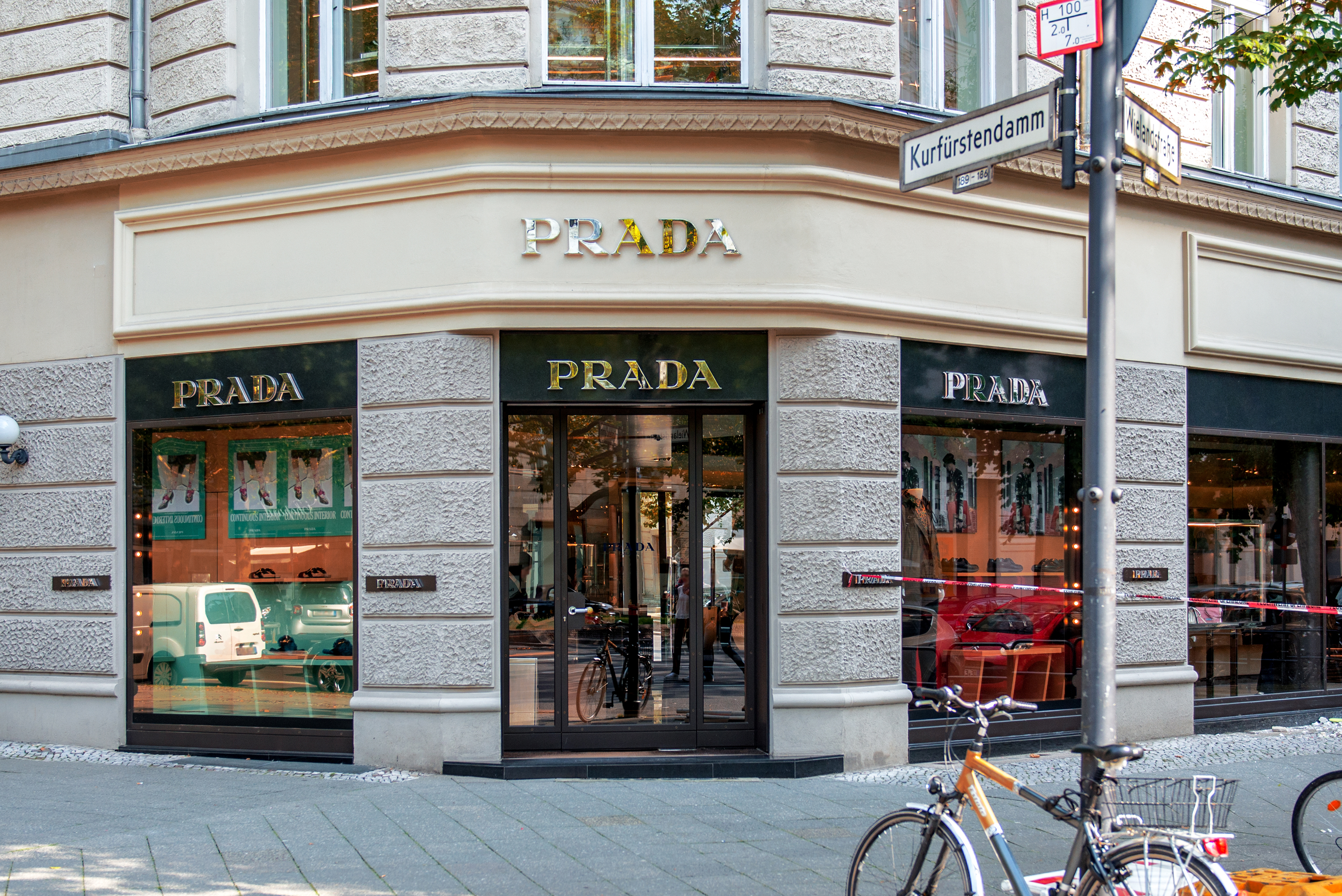
Prada Berlin

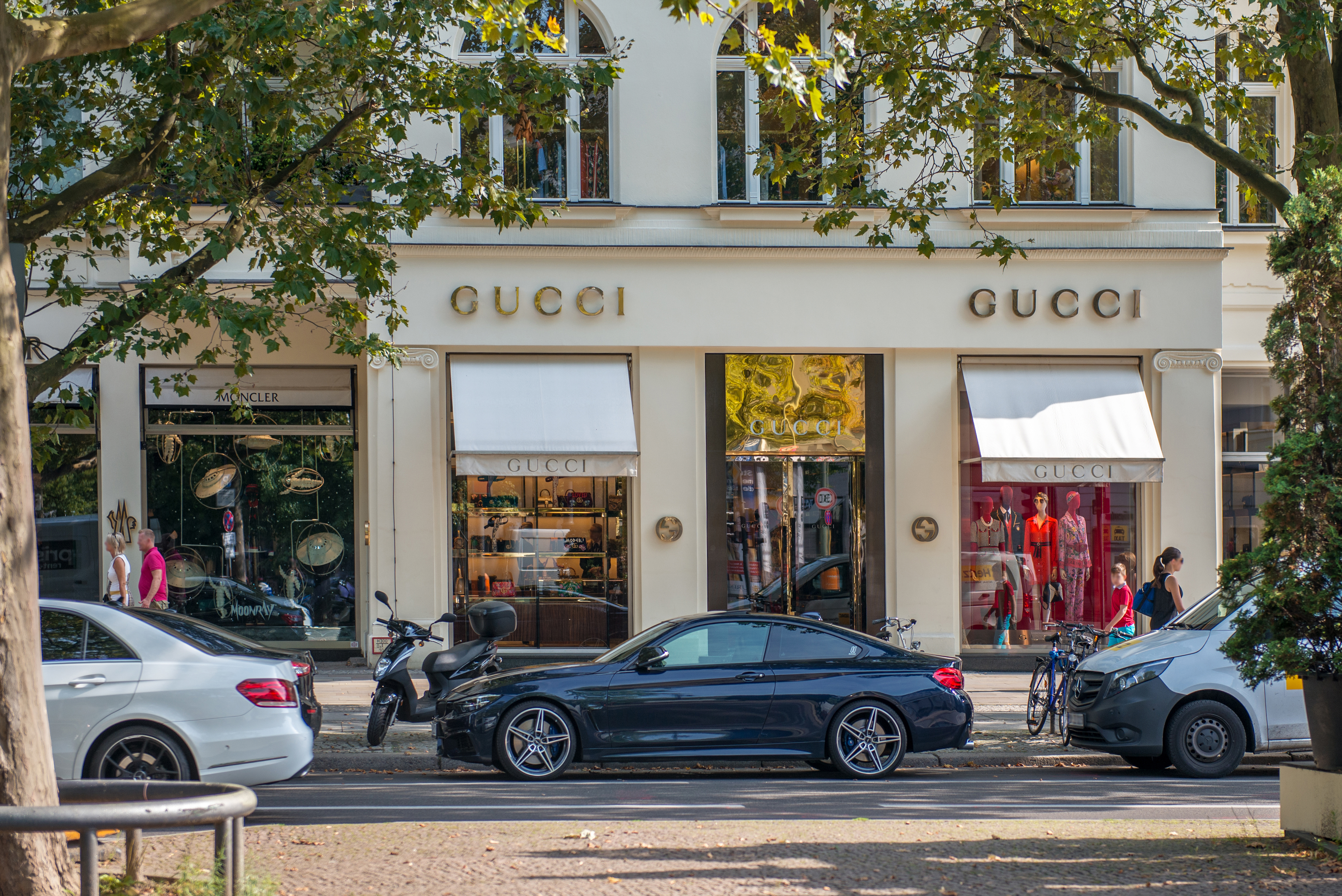
Gucci Berlin

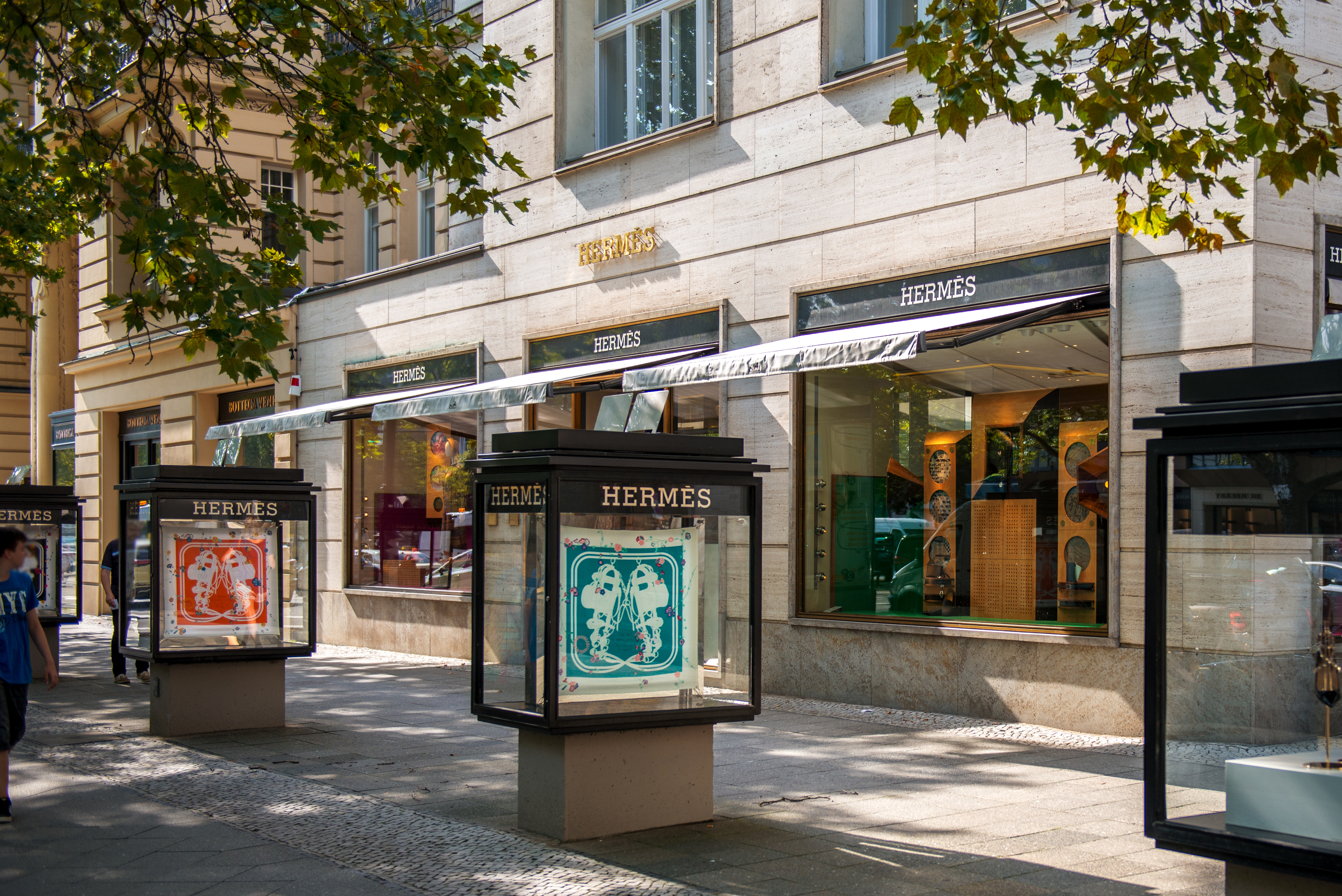
Hermès Berlin

== History ==
Unlike the adjacent streets, the Kurfürstendamm developed out of a historic corduroy road (German: Damm) laid out by the Brandenburg margraves to reach the Grunewald hunting lodge, which was erected about 1542 at the behest of the Hohenzollern elector Joachim II Hector. Although the exact date of the building is unknown, an unnamed causeway leading from the Stadtschloss through the swampy area between the settlements of Charlottenburg (then called Lietzow) and Wilmersdorf to Grunewald is already depicted in a 1685 map. The name Churfürsten Damm was first mentioned between 1767 and 1787.

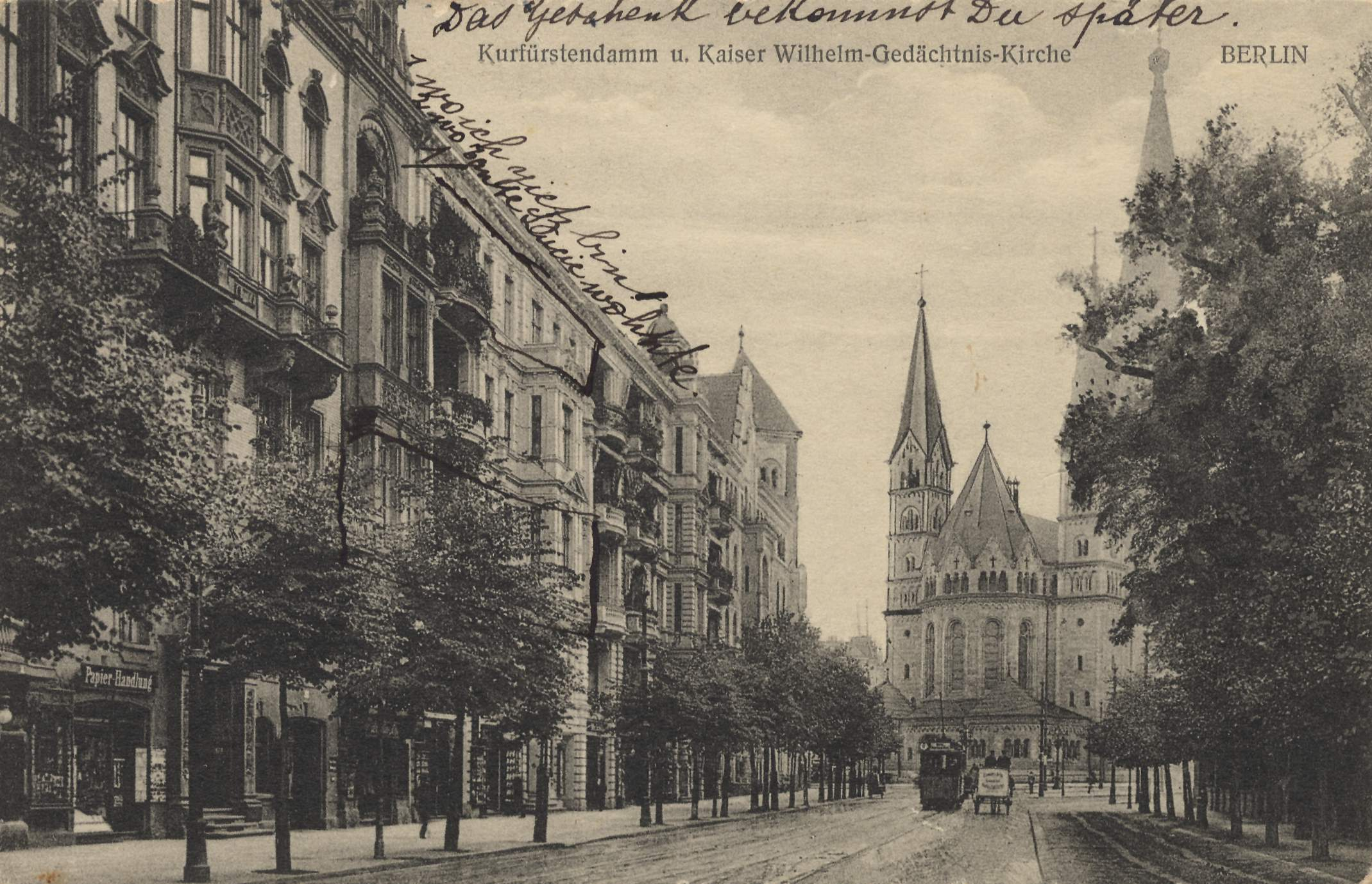
View to Kaiser Wilhelm Memorial Church, 1916 postcard

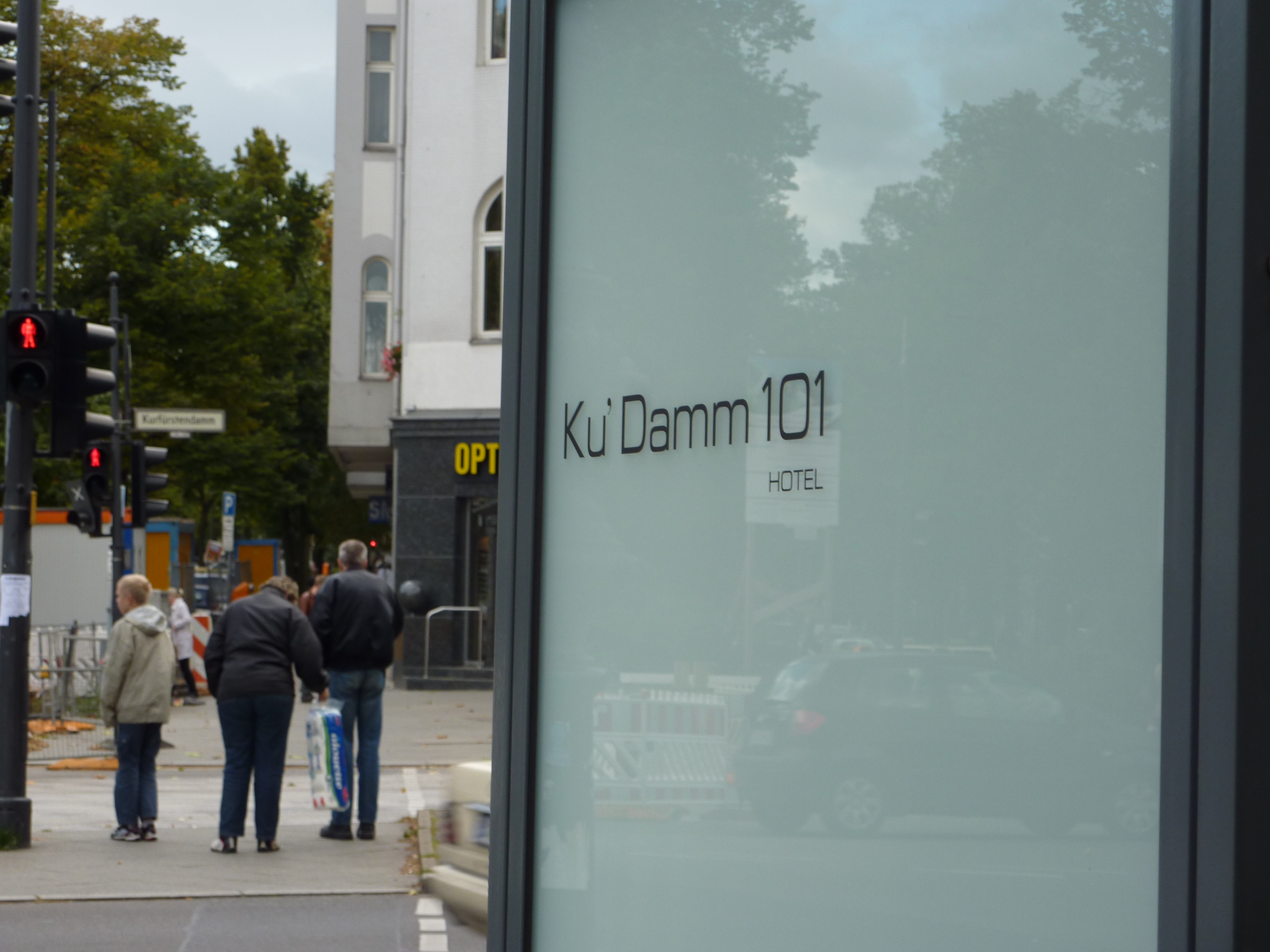
Colloquial abbreviation for Kurfürstendamm shown in name of the Ku'Damm 101 hotel

From 1875 the former bridlepath was embellished as a boulevard with a breadth of 53 m (174 ft) on the personal initiative of chancellor Otto von Bismarck, who also proposed the building of the Grunewald mansions colony at its western end. In 1882, Ernst Werner von Siemens presented his Elektromote trolley bus concept at an experimental track near Halensee station. The nearby Lunapark opened in 1909, then Europe's largest amusement park, modelled on Coney Island, where boxer Max Schmeling won his first title as German light heavyweight champion in 1926. After a long period of decline the park was finally closed in 1933. Large parts are today covered by the Stadtautobahn.

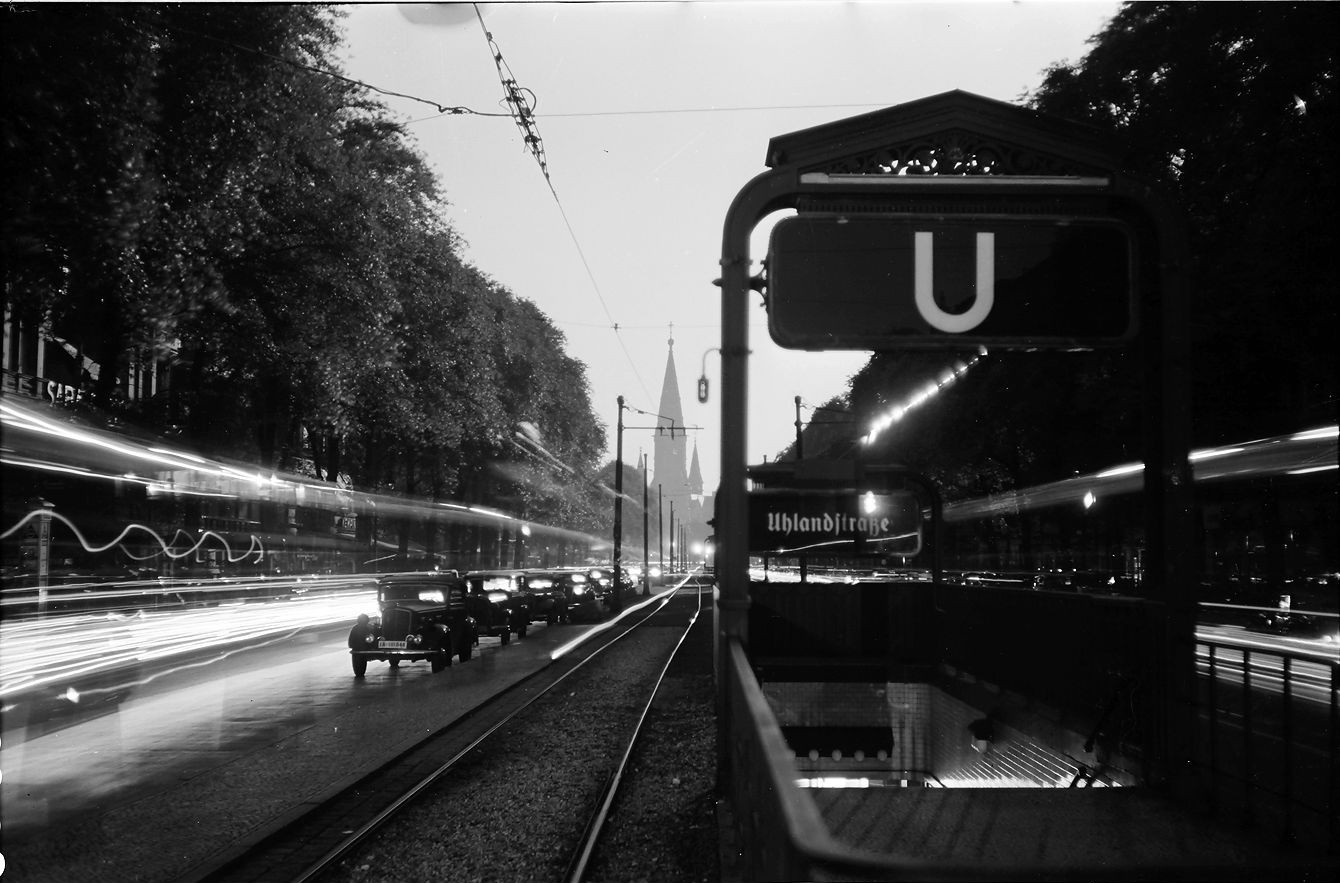
Kurfürstendamm, 1937

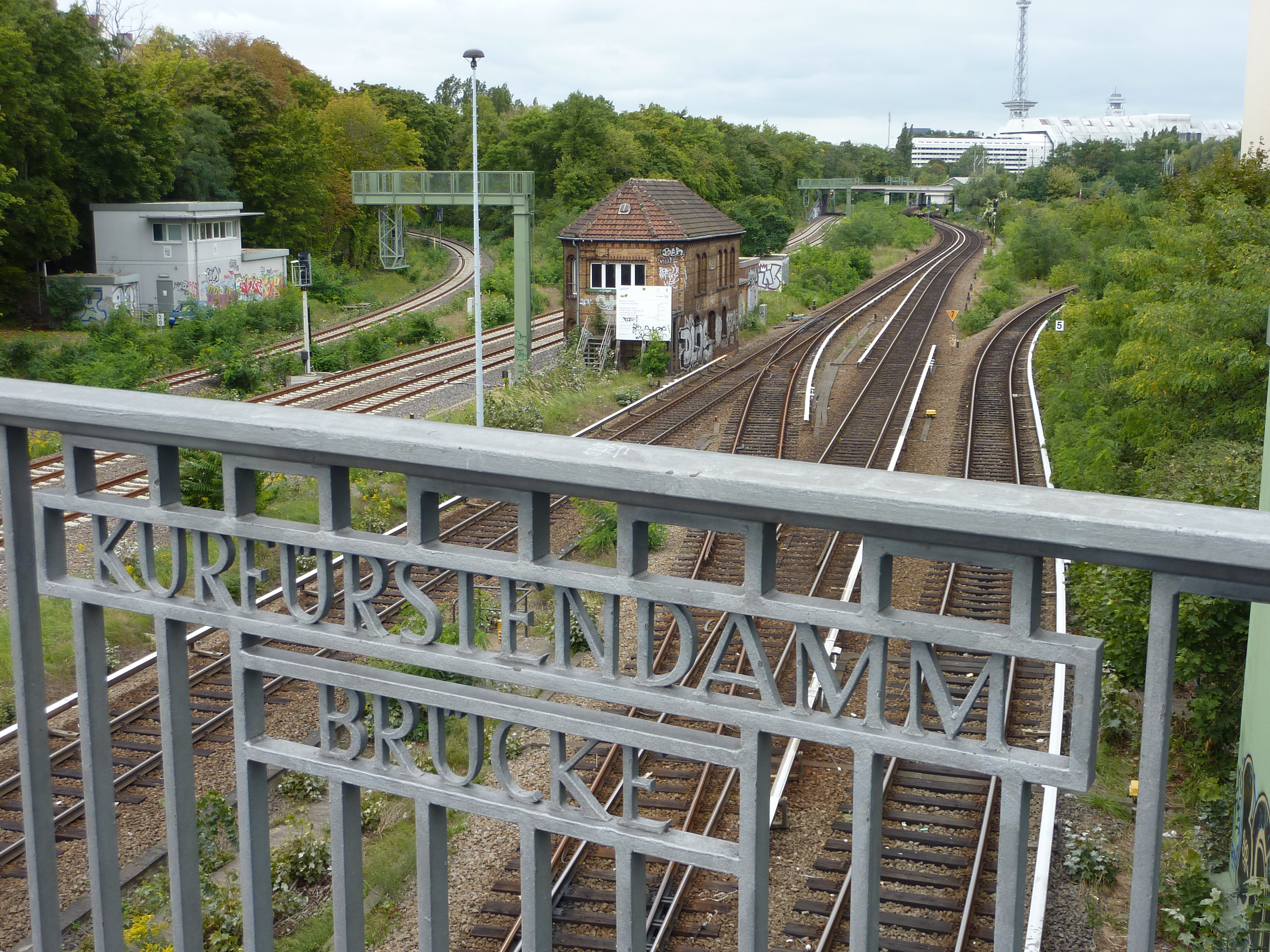
Ku'Damm Bridge

In 1913 the new Marmorhaus cinema opened. A number of major film premieres were held here during the silent era.

Especially during the "Golden Twenties" the Kurfürstendamm area of the "New West" was a centre of leisure and nightlife in Berlin, an era that ended with the Great Depression and the Nazi Machtergreifung in 1933. On Sep 12, 1931, radical antisemite Nazi Wolf-Heinrich Graf von Helldorff organized a riot, about a thousand men appeared from within the crowd on the streets and started attacking people whom they believed to be Jewish.

On July 15, 1935, about 200 Nazi Storm Troopers went on a sadistic attack, in "the most brutal anti-Jewish manifestation since Hitler's rise to power," with Hitler's instigation, and Nazi-managed press blaming the victims. Varian Fry, an American journalist and future Righteous Among the Nations, witnessed the brutality and was inspired to become an "ardent anti-Nazi." Leon Milton Birkhead, an American minister visiting Berlin, also witnessed the brutality and dedicated the rest of his life to fighting fascism and antisemitism. The shops and businesses owned by Jewish tradespeople became the target of several pogroms, culminating in the "Reichskristallnacht" of 9 November 1938. In World War II the boulevard suffered severe damage from air raids and the Battle of Berlin.

Nevertheless, after the war rebuilding started quickly, and when Berlin was separated into East and West Berlin, the Kurfürstendamm became the leading commercial street of West Berlin in its Wirtschaftswunder days. For that reason, too, John F. Kennedy's tour of West Berlin on June 26, 1963, included a portion of it. A few years later, the Kurfürstendamm became the site of protests and major demonstrations by the German student movement. On 11 April 1968, spokesman Rudi Dutschke was shot in the head while leaving the office of the Sozialistischer Deutscher Studentenbund on Kurfürstendamm No. 140.

After German reunification the Kurfürstendamm had to compete with central places like Potsdamer Platz, Friedrichstraße, and Alexanderplatz, which led to the closing of numerous cafés and cinemas. It retained the character of a flâneur and upscale shopping street as the western continuation of the Tauentzienstraße with its large department stores.

The globally unique international art project United Buddy Bears was presented in Berlin on the Kurfürstendamm during the summer of 2011.

== See also ==
- City West
