= Christuskirche, Rome =

Lutheran Evangelical church in Rome, Italy

Coordinates: 41°54′32″N 12°29′30″E

Christuskirche
- Evangelisch-lutherische Christuskirche
- Italian: Chiesa evangelica luterana
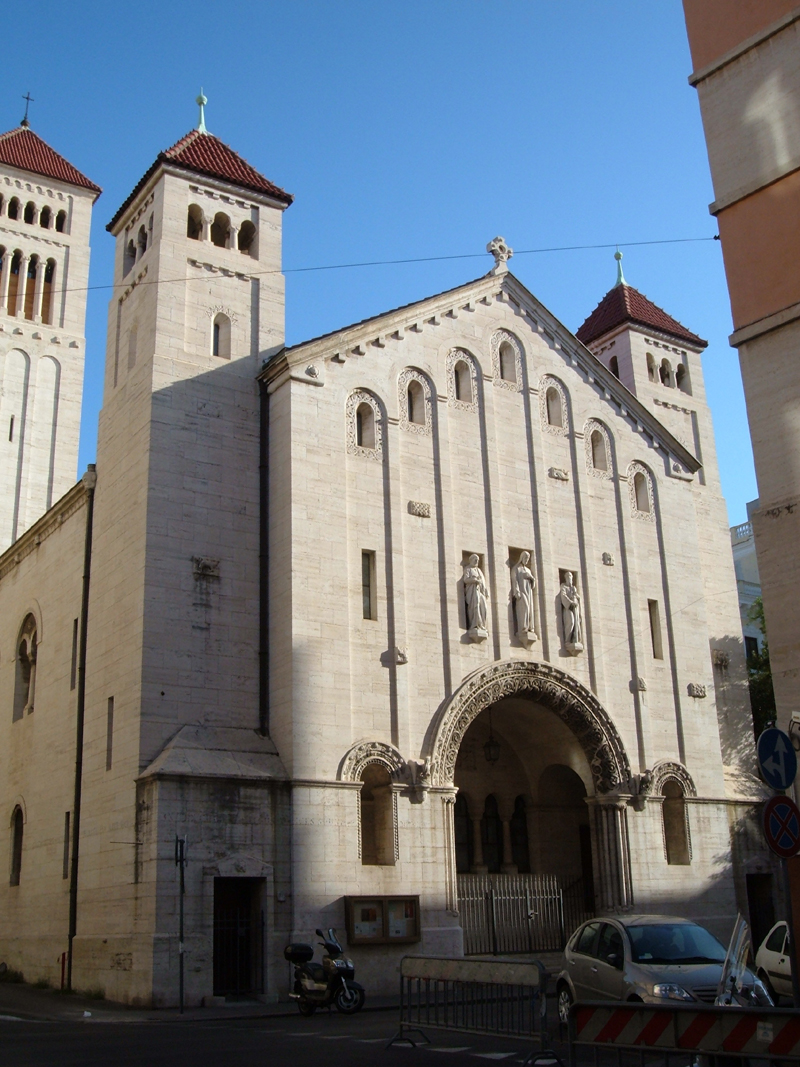
- Christuskirche in 2008
- Christuskirche
- Denomination: Lutheran
- Website: www.ev-luth-gemeinde-rom.org

Architecture
- Architect: Franz Schwechten
- Style: Romanesque Revival
- Groundbreaking: 1910
- Completed: 1922

The Christuskirche is a Lutheran Evangelical church in Rome. It was built between 1910 and 1922 under the direction of architect Franz Heinrich Schwechten, who was also responsible for the Kaiser-Wilhelm-Gedächtniskirche in Berlin.

On 11 December 1983, Pope John Paul II visited the church and participated in an ecumenical service, the first papal visit ever to a Lutheran church. The visit took place 500 years after the birth of the German Martin Luther, the former Augustinian friar and Protestant Reformer.

On January 14, 2015, Swedish actress Anita Ekberg's funeral Mass was held at Christuskirche.
