= Hermann Schaper (painter) =

German artist (1853–1911)

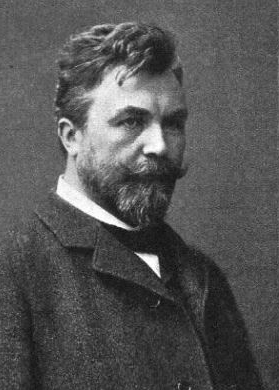
- Born: 13 October 1853; Hanover, Germany
- Died: 12 June 1911 (aged 57); Hanover, Germany
- Education: Academy of Fine Arts, Munich
- Occupation: Artist
- Known for: Painting, mosaics

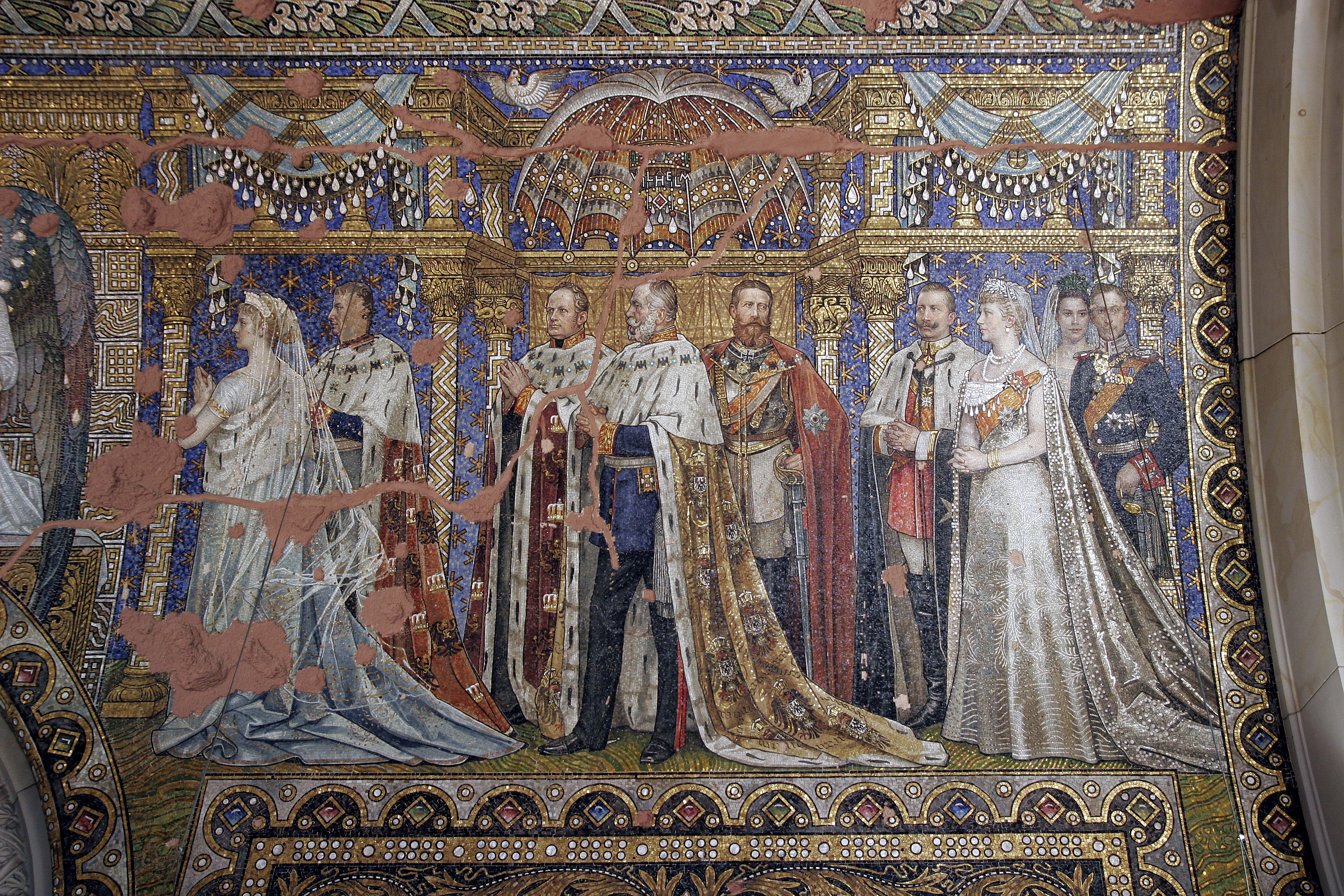
Mosaic in the Kaiser Wilhelm Memorial Church

Hermann Schaper (13 October 1853 – 12 June 1911) was a German portrait and church painter. He also created mosaics and interior designs.

== Biography ==
He was born in Hanover. His father was the Hanoverian court decorator, Christian Schaper. After attending the local gymnsium, he studied at the Technical High School from 1869 to 1873. There, he majored in art history and medieval architecture. His primary instructor was Conrad Wilhelm Hase.

From there, he went to Munich, where he enrolled at the Academy of Fine Arts. His primary instructors there were Ludwig von Löfftz and Wilhelm von Diez . He was there until 1875. For a time he was also an assistant to the architect Georg von Hauberrisser.

Upon returning to Hanover, he joined the Hannoverscher Künstlerverein The following year, he took over the family business. Whether his father died or simply retired appears to be unknown. From then through 1879, he painted decorations at various buildings in Hanover, including the Alte Rathaus. After that, he became a free-lance painter.

In 1889, he was appointed a professor and went on a study trip to Tavenna, Italy. He became a member of the Hannoversche Bauhütte, an architect's association, in 1900. At the Große Berliner Kunstausstellung (Great Berlin Art Exhibition) of 1905, he was awarded a small gold medal.

He devoted himself primarily to decorating historical buildings and churches. His best-known works include the design of the Aachen Cathedral and murals for the Altes Rathaus in Göttingen as well as Malbork Castle, in Malbork, Poland. He also created designs for mosaics, including the ones depicting members of the Hohenzollern family in the Kaiser Wilhelm Memorial Church in Berlin. Until 1911, his workshop was busy with orders for large mosaics, most of which were constructed by Puhl & Wagner, a Berlin-based company that also produced stained glass.

His studio continued operating for a time after his death, but the loss of his younger employees in World War I led to its closure. During World War II, many of his works were destroyed.
