= Stalingrad Madonna =

Drawing of the Virgin Mary

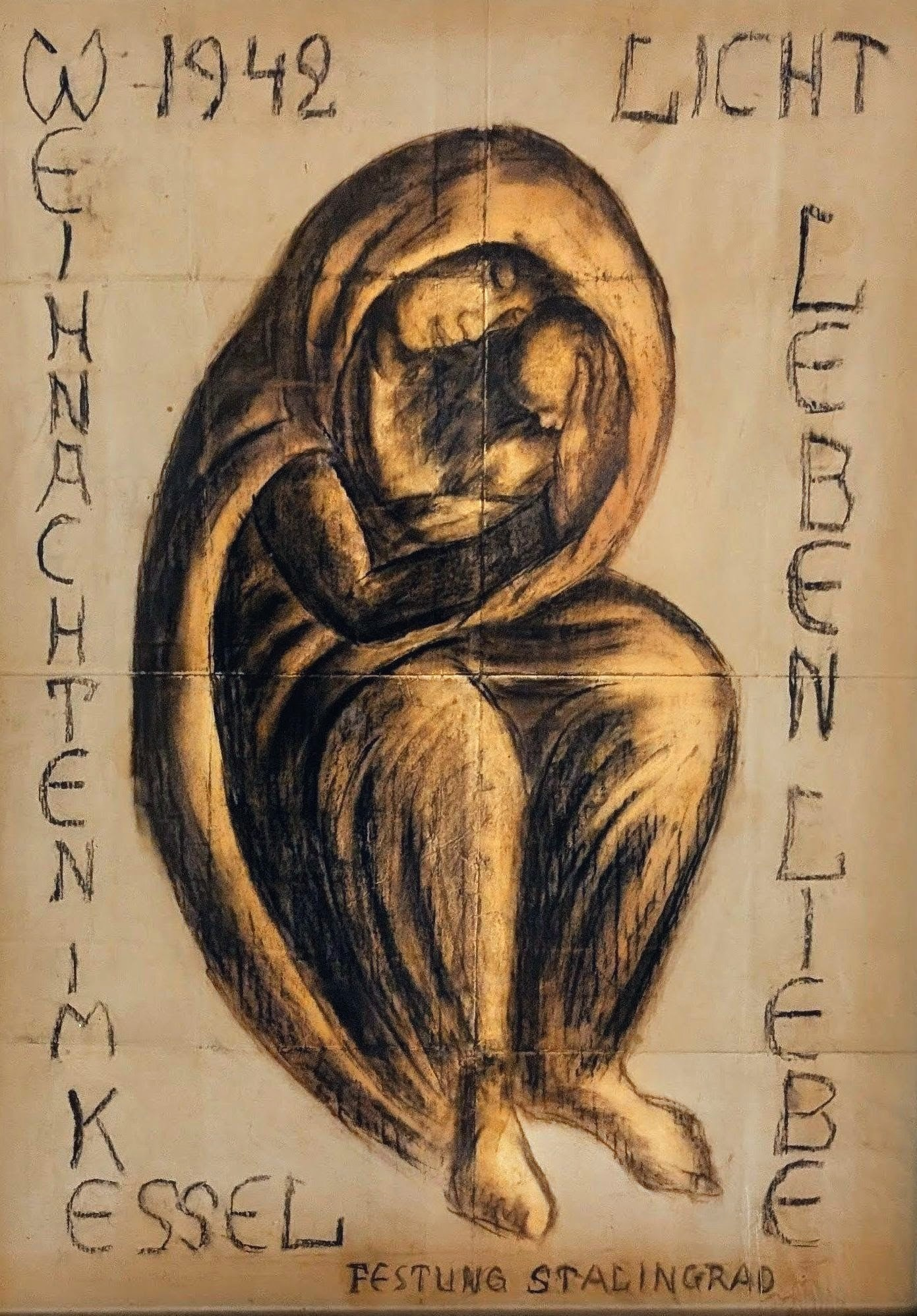
The Stalingrad Madonna

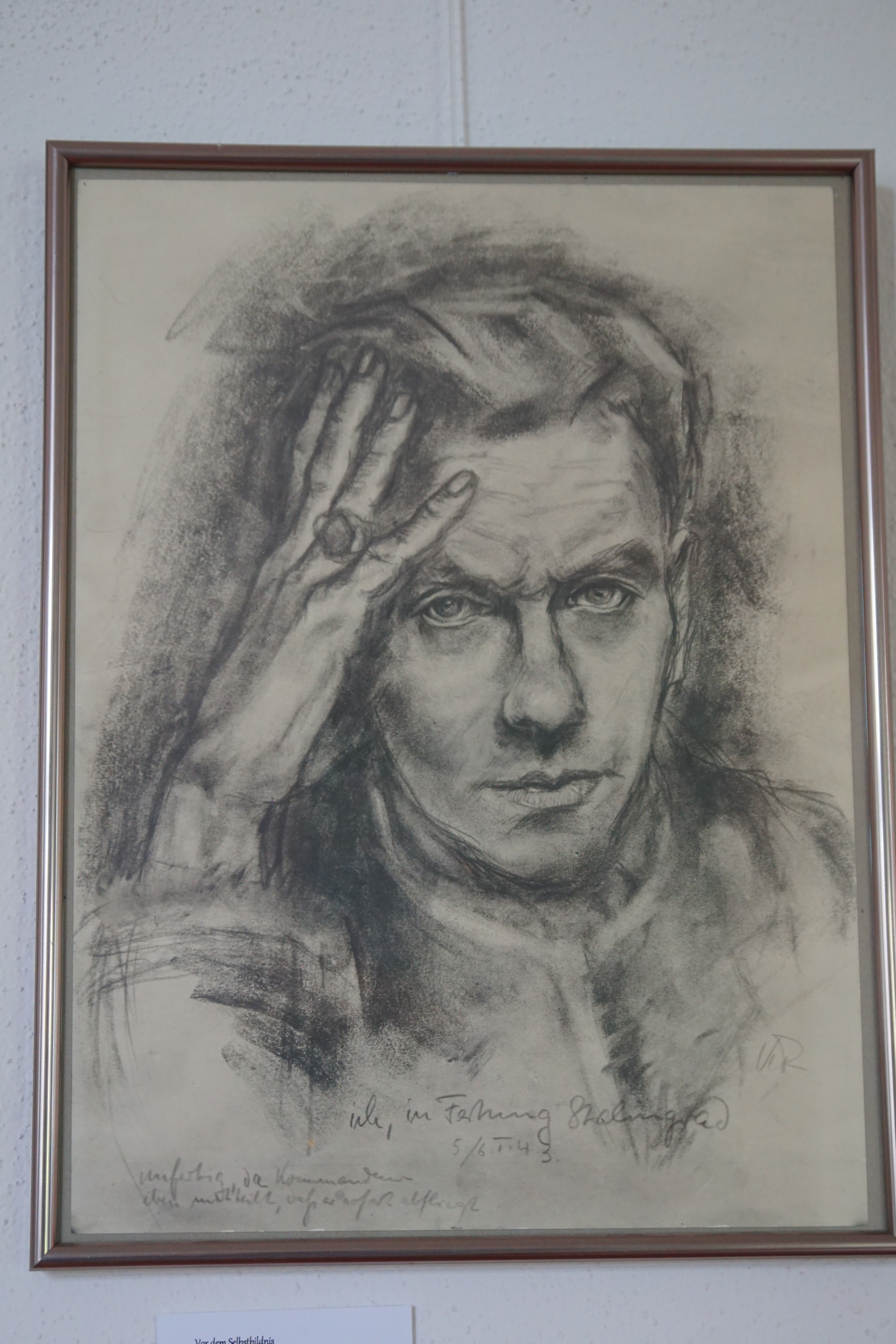
Kurt Reuber, self-portrait made in Stalingrad

The Stalingrad Madonna (German: Stalingradmadonna) is an image of the Virgin Mary drawn by a German soldier, Kurt Reuber (1906–1944), in 1942 during the Battle of Stalingrad. The original is displayed in the Kaiser Wilhelm Memorial Church, Berlin, while copies now hang in the cathedrals of Berlin, Coventry, and Kazan Cathedral, Volgograd, as a sign of the reconciliation between Germany and its enemies the United Kingdom and Russia during the Second World War.

== Design ==
The piece is a simple charcoal sketch, measuring three feet by four feet (900 mm × 1200 mm). Mary is depicted wrapped in a large shawl, holding the infant Jesus close to her cheek. On the right border are the words Licht, Leben, Liebe ("Light, Life, Love"), from the Gospel of John. On the left, Reuber wrote Weihnachten im Kessel 1942 ("Christmas in the Kettle 1942") and at the bottom Festung Stalingrad ("Fortress Stalingrad"). Kessel ("kettle") is the German term for an encircled military area, and Fortress Stalingrad was the label for the encircled army promoted in the Nazi press.

== History ==
The picture was drawn by Lieutenant Kurt Reuber, a German staff physician and Protestant pastor, in December 1942 during the Battle of Stalingrad. Reuber wrote:

I wondered for a long while what I should paint, and in the end I decided on a Madonna, or mother and child. I have turned my hole in the frozen mud into a studio. The space is too small for me to be able to see the picture properly, so I climb on to a stool and look down at it from above, to get the perspective right. Everything is repeatedly knocked over, and my pencils vanish into the mud. There is nothing to lean my big picture of the Madonna against, except a sloping, home-made table past which I can just manage to squeeze. There are no proper materials and I have used a Russian map for paper. But I wish I could tell you how absorbed I have been painting my Madonna, and how much it means to me.
The picture looks like this: the mother's head and the child's lean toward each other, and a large cloak enfolds them both. It is intended to symbolize "security" and "mother love". I remembered the words of St.John: light, life, and love. What more can I add? I wanted to suggest these three things in the homely and common vision of a mother with her child and the security that they represent.

He added that he:

went to all the bunkers, brought my drawing to the men, and chatted with them. How they sat there! Like being in their dear homes with mother for the holiday.

Later, Reuber hung the drawing in his bunker for his unit celebration, which he described as a moment of Christian devotion shared by all the soldiers in his command.

When according to ancient custom I opened the Christmas door, the slatted door of our bunker, and the comrades went in, they stood as if entranced, devout and too moved to speak in front of the picture on the clay wall. ...The entire celebration took place under the influence of the picture, and they thoughtfully read the words: light, life, love. ...Whether commander or simple soldier, the Madonna was always an object of outward and inward contemplation.

The Madonna was flown out of Stalingrad by Dr Wilhelm Grosse, his battalion commander of the 16th Panzer Division on the last transport plane to leave the encircled German 6th Army. Reuber was taken captive after the surrender of the 6th Army, and died in a Soviet prisoner of war camp in 1944. The Madonna and a number of letters from Reuber were delivered to his family. There they remained, until German Federal President Karl Carstens encouraged Reuber's surviving children to donate the work to the Kaiser Wilhelm Memorial Church in Berlin. Springer, Reuber's three children, and Prince Louis Ferdinand (in his role as chair of the Memorial Church board of trustees) attended the dedication ceremony in August 1983.

== Influence ==
The drawing and Reuber's letters were published shortly after the war, and Navy chaplain Arno Pötzsch wrote an apologetic book of poetry entitled The Madonna of Stalingrad in 1946. The work became a powerful symbol of peace in the Cold War era, as well as part of the mythologising of Stalingrad and the events of the Second World War in German society. Copies were presented, and are displayed, in the cathedrals of Volgograd (formerly Stalingrad), Berlin, and Coventry as a symbol of reconciliation. Similarly a Cross of Nails from Coventry is displayed with the Madonna in the Kaiser Wilhelm Memorial Church.

== The Prisoners' Madonna ==
Reuber painted a second similar picture in captivity around Christmas 1943. He was by this time in a prisoner of war camp in Yelabuga, some 1,000 kilometres north-east of Stalingrad, and the painting was made for the prisoners' newspaper. He titled it The Prisoners' Madonna. Reuber did not live to see another Christmas, dying of illness a few weeks later on 20 January 1944.
