= Imperial Castle, Poznań =

Imperial Castle
- Zamek Cesarski
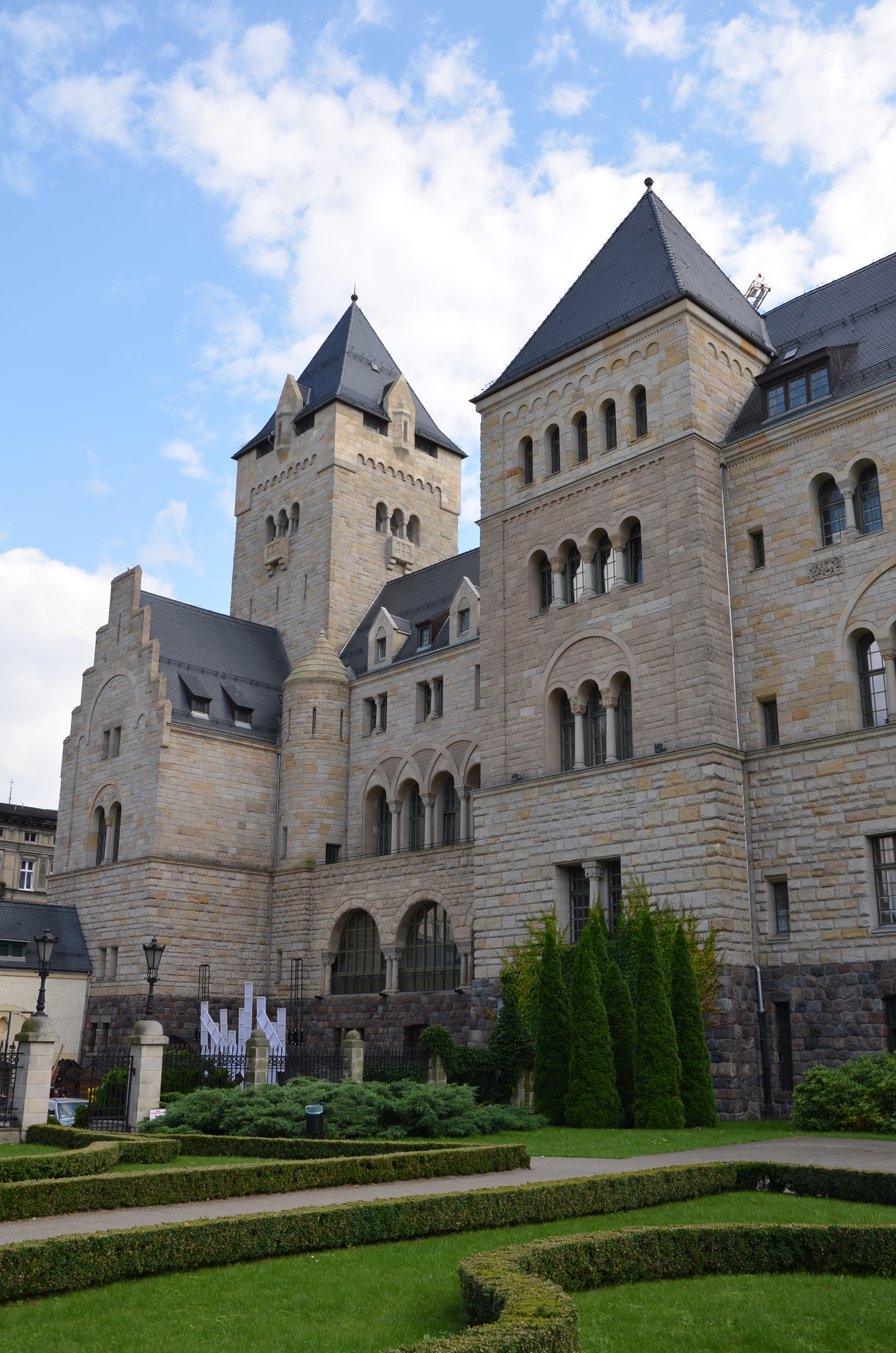
- Façade of the castle

- Location within Poland Location within Greater Poland Voivodeship

General information
- Type: Palace
- Architectural style: Neo-Romanesque
- Location: Poznań, Poland, Poland
- Coordinates: 52°24′28″N 16°55′07″E
- Current tenants: Zamek Culture Centre
- Construction started: 1905
- Completed: 1910
- Inaugurated: 21 August 1910
- Demolished: 1945 (castle tower)
- Cost: 5 million German mark
- Client: Wilhelm II
- Owner: Polish government

Height
- Height: 75 m (246 ft)

Technical details
- Floor area: 25.127 m^{2}

Design and construction
- Architect: Franz Heinrich Schwechten
- Other designers: August Oetken

Website
- Official Website

The Imperial Castle in Poznań, popularly called Zamek, "the Castle" (Polish: Zamek Cesarski w Poznaniu, German: Königliches Residenzschloss Posen), is a palace in Poznań, Poland. It was built under German rule in 1910 by Franz Schwechten for Wilhelm II, German Emperor, with substantial suggestions from the Emperor.

Since its completion, the building has housed government offices of Germany (to 1918, and during World War II) and of Poland (1918–1939, 1945–present).

== Naming ==
The name of this structure can be misleading, as the building is a palace rather than a castle. Another difference arises from the adjective imperial (cesarski) preferred by the Poles and royal (königliches) used by the Germans. The German name refers to Wilhelm II as King of Prussia, in this function he had the palace built as his provincial residence, while the Polish name refers to him as German Emperor because the term "royal" is reserved for the Poznań's Royal Castle, residence of the medieval kings of Poland.

== Location ==
The location of the castle was not accidental. After the deconstruction of the polygonal part of the Stronghold Poznań, Poznań was transformed to a residential city (Haupt- und Residenzstadt). On the new lands, Prussian authorities – who annexed the city in the Second Partition of Poland in 1793 – decided to build a new Germanic urban core, known as the "Imperial District". The projects for the new district were prepared by Josef Stübben. Monumental buildings of the Imperial Districts surrounding the castle included:

- Post Office building
- headquarters of the Prussian Settlement Commission (now Collegium Maius)
- Royal Academy (Königliche Akademie in Posen) (today Aula of the Adam Mickiewicz University, Collegium Minus and the Collegium Iuridicum)
- City Theatre (today the opera house)
- Academy of Music (Akademia Muzyczna w Poznaniu)
- Evangelical-Augsburg Church of St. Paul (today Roman Catholic Church of the Holiest Savior)
- Monument to Otto von Bismarck

== Architecture ==
The castle was built in Neo-Romanesque style, considered by Wilhelm to be the most "Germanic" and representing the glory of the Holy Roman Empire. The new residence was intended to reflect the control over Greater Poland by the Kingdom of Prussia and the German Empire.

The main building located in the southern part of the complex has two wings: the western – the larger one – consisting of apartments, and the eastern with representative rooms. On the ground floor of the western wing were rooms of the Court Marshal, Chamberlain and other members of imperial court. On the first floor were the apartments of the Emperor and his wife. A private chapel in a Byzantine style (decorated by August Oetken) was located in a tower. Under the chapel, on the western side of the tower was the entrance reserved for the Emperor. From the entrance, stairs lead straight to the first floor. The bedrooms of the emperor and the empress were connected by a corridor with four statues of the following rulers: Margrave Gero, Emperor Otto I, Emperor Frederick Barbarossa, and Duke Władysław II the Exile. The second floor was planned to be used by the Crown Prince (the so-called prince rooms). Most of rooms were connected by a foyer surrounding the inner yard.

The most impressive room of the representative wing was the Throne Room in Byzantine style. The room was lighted by huge windows from three sides, positioned between the columns and the arches. Eight statues of Holy Roman Emperors were placed under the arches. The throne, designed in an oriental style, was situated under the middle arch. Over the windows was a gallery for guests and the orchestra. The entrance to this part of the castle was from Wałowa Street (today Kościuszki Street).

The north part of the complex, facing Berlin Street (now Fredry Street), comprised service rooms, a garage, a stable, and a coach house. These structures and two wings of the main building surround a rose garden that includes a fountain modeled on the Fountain of the Lions in the Court of the Lions in the Alhambra, in Granada, Spain.

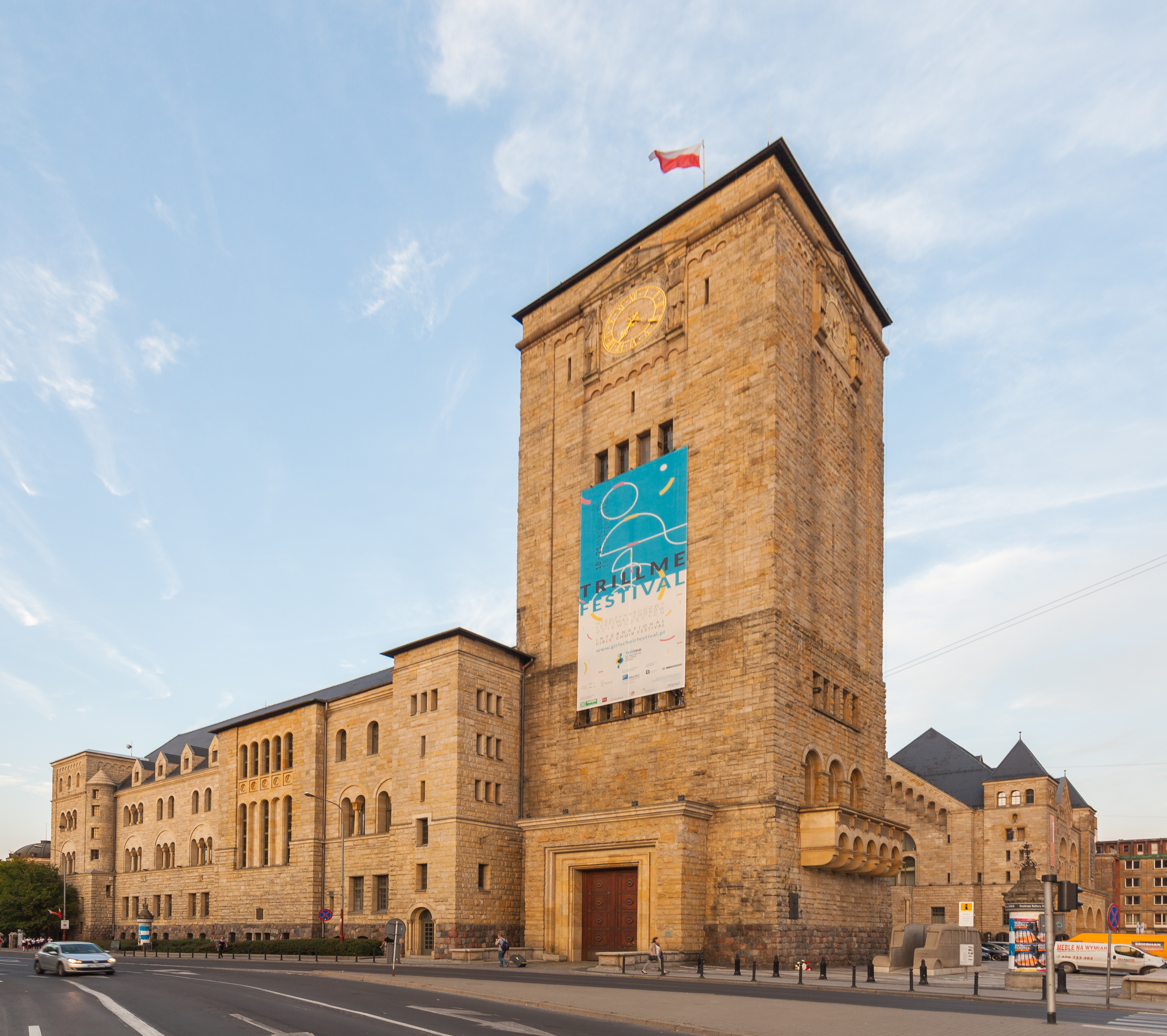
Imperial Castle

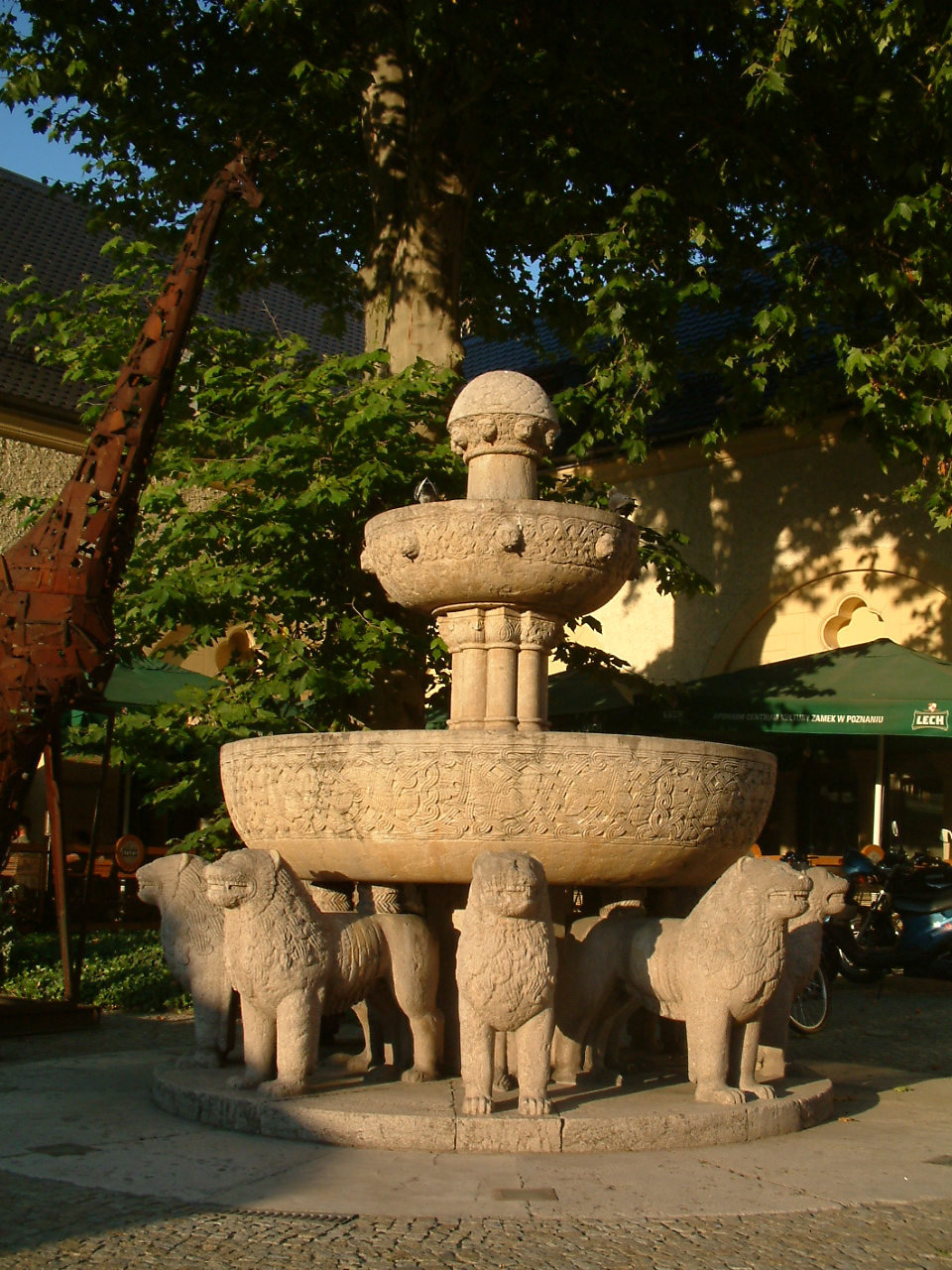
Fountain with lions

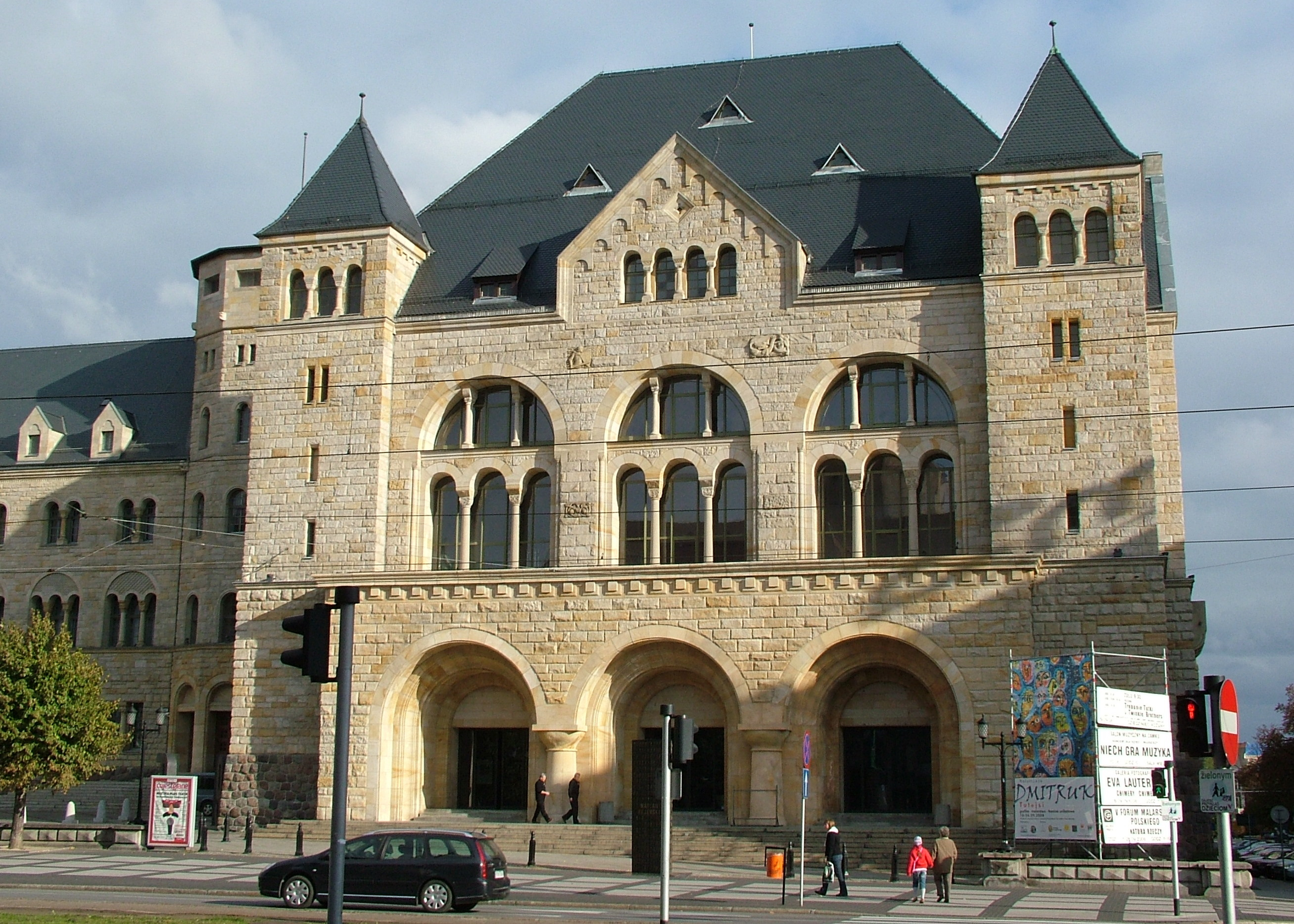
Western, representative wing, whose entrance was built during World War II

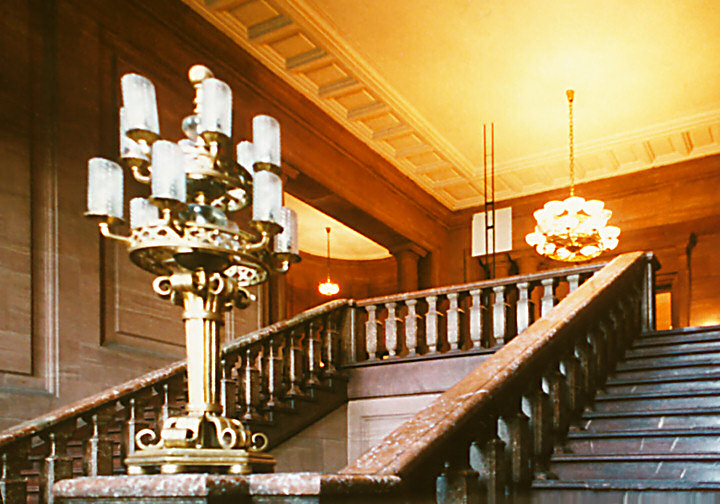
Kaiserliche Stairs in Castle

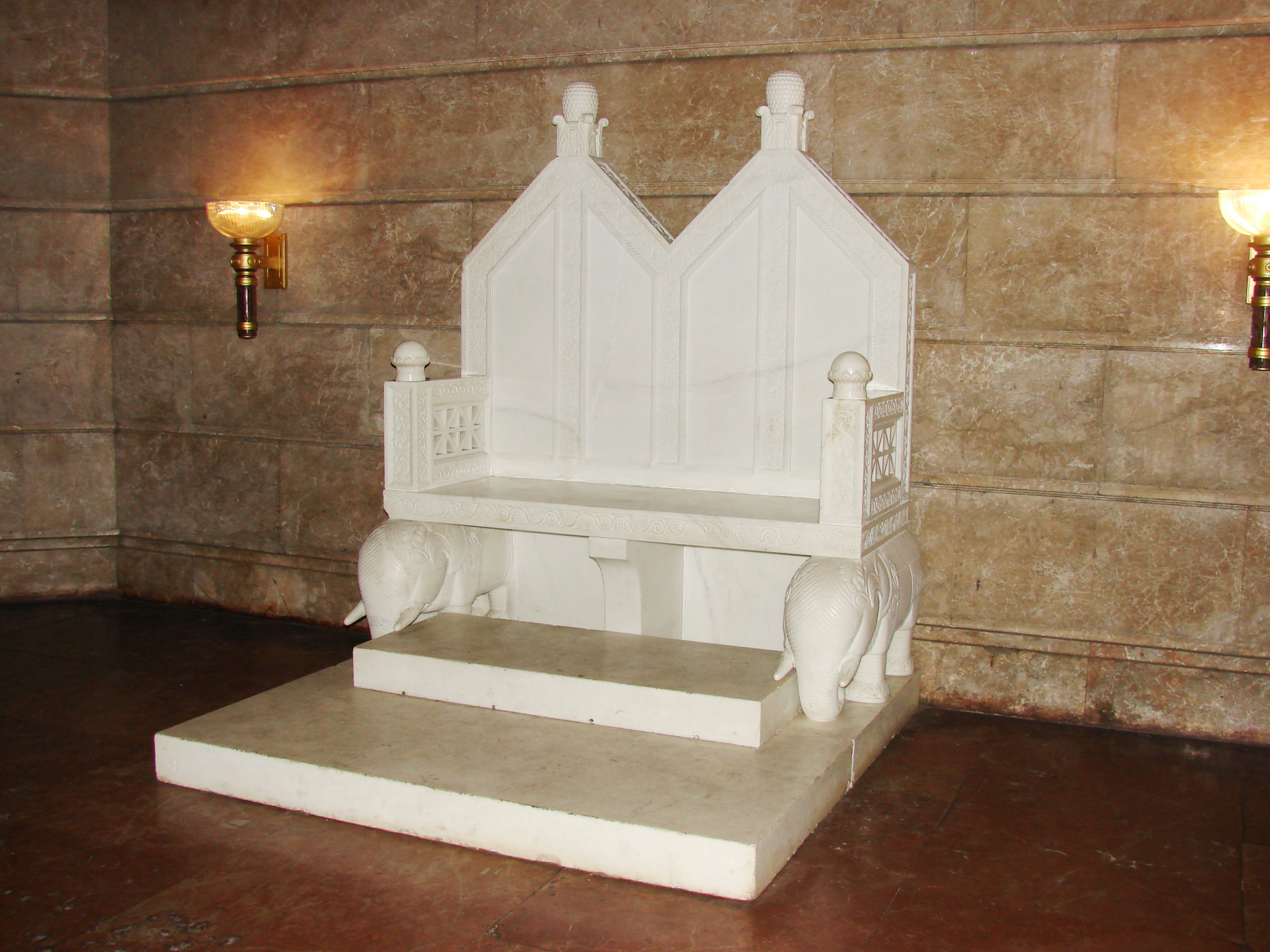
Emperor's throne

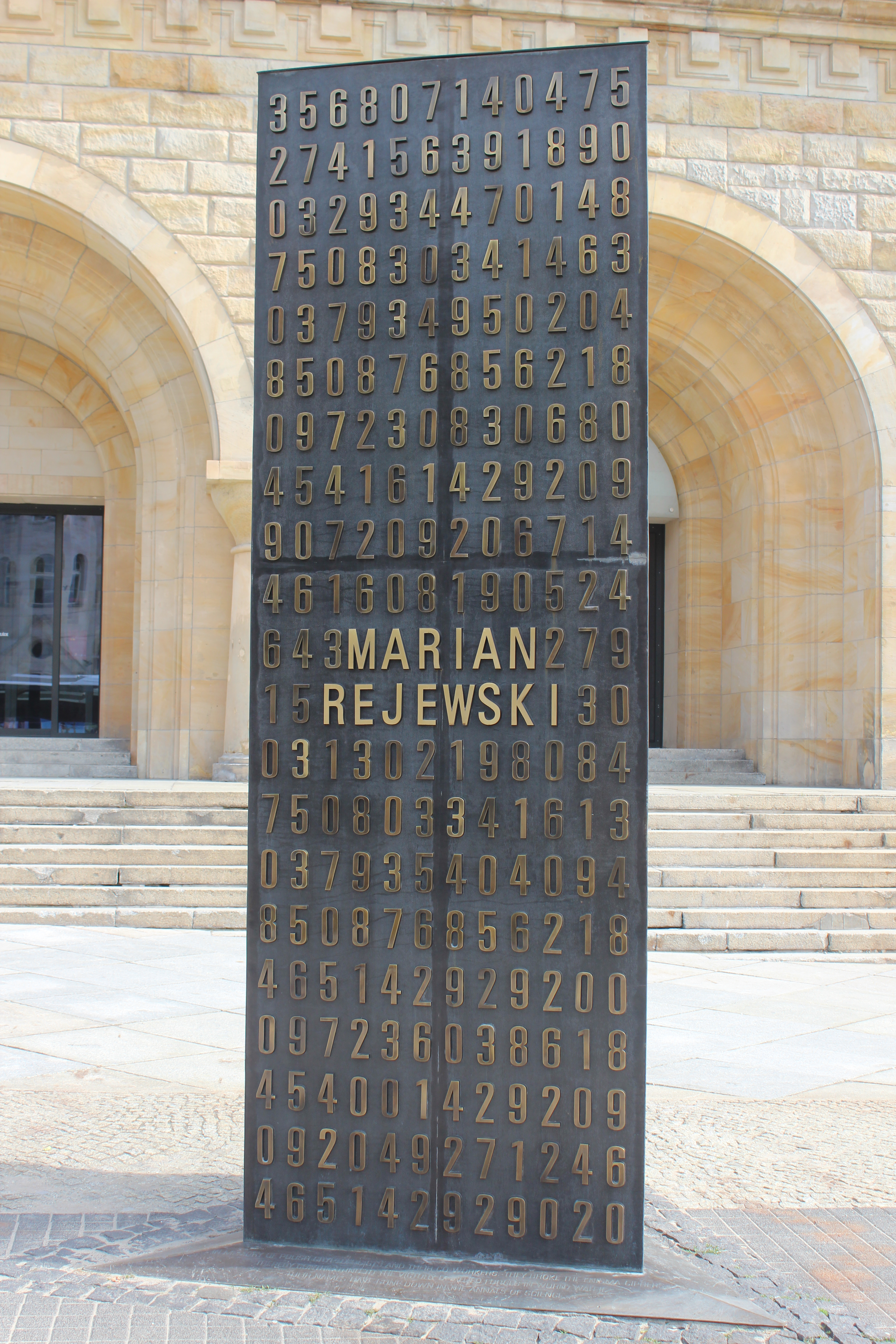
Monument to Polish cryptologists who first broke Germany's Enigma ciphers

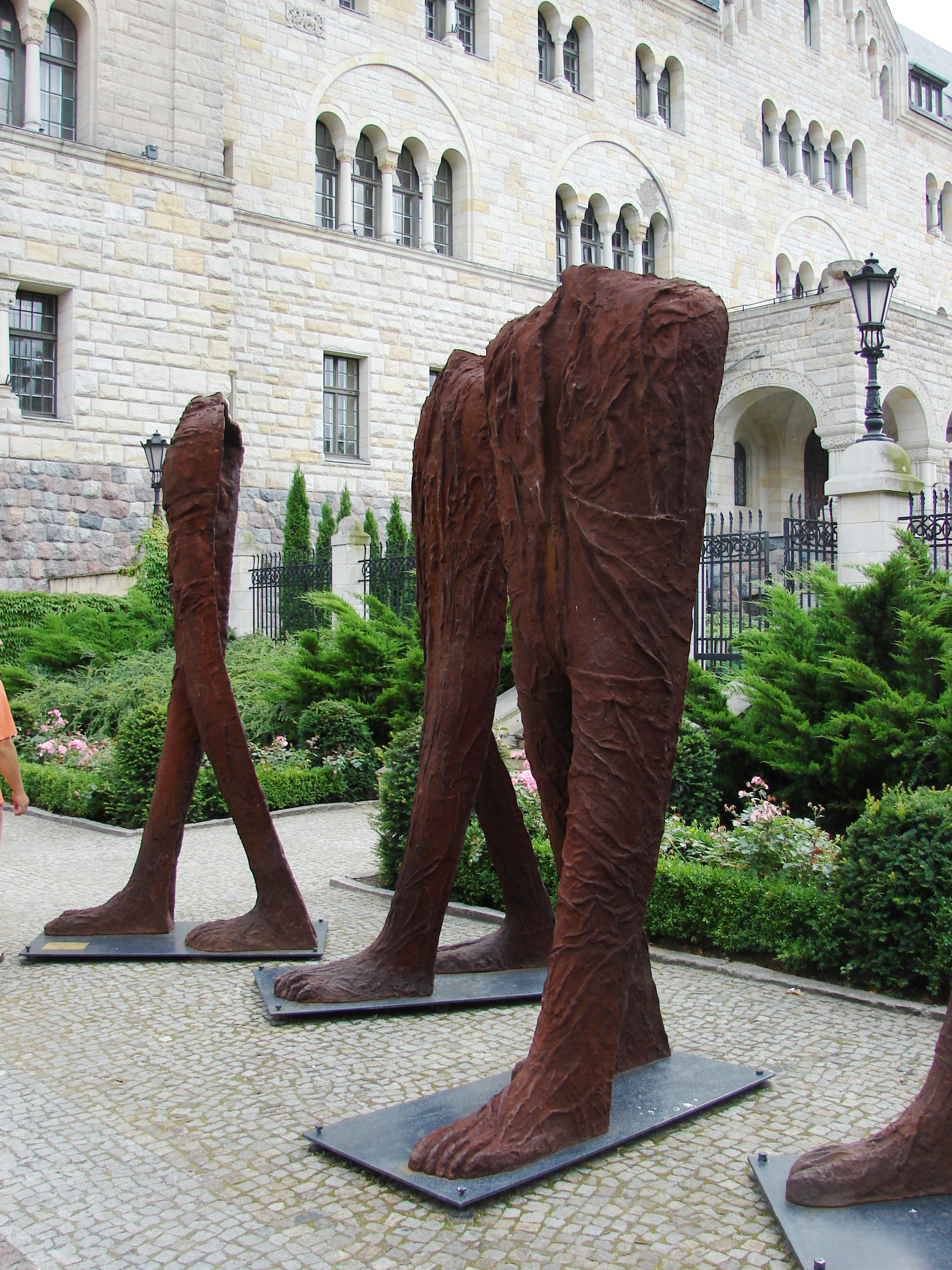
Abakans, sculptures by Magdalena Abakanowicz in Poznań Castle's rose garden

== History ==
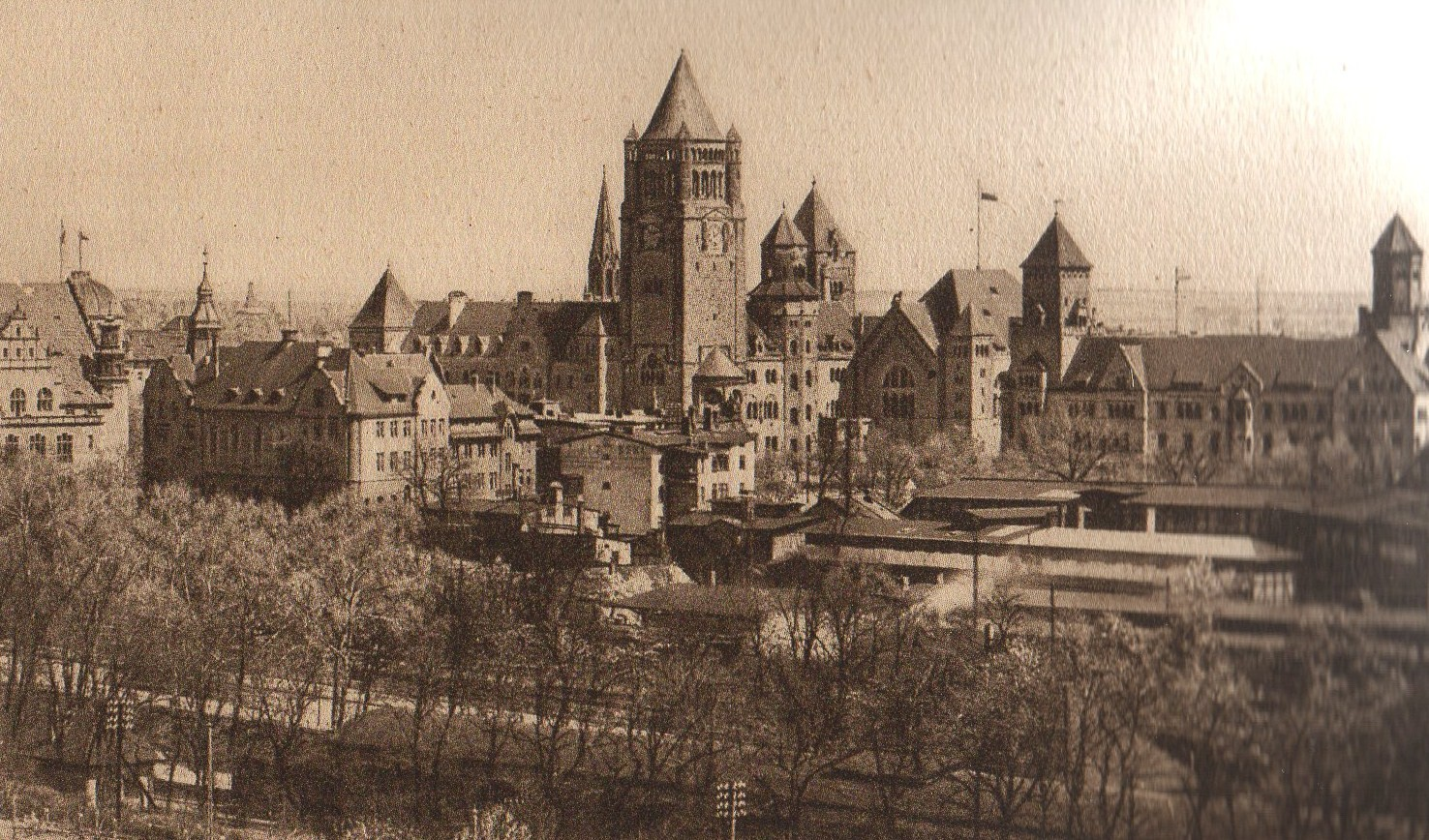
The Castle with its original tower roof in 1929

Construction began in 1905 (plans were ready in 1904), and five years later, on 21 August 1910, during a visit of the Emperor to Poznań (called Posener Kaisertage), the architect presented the keys to the new residence to Wilhelm. The total cost of the building was five million German marks, and the castle is the youngest in Europe. Wilhelm's first, and only, burgrave (Schlosshauptmann) in 1906–1918 was Polish nobleman, Count Bogdan Hutten-Czapski.

After the Greater Poland Uprising (1918–1919) and the restoration of independent Poland, the castle became the property of the Second Polish Republic. According to a decision of the Polish government in 1921, the castle became the residence of the Chief of State and later the President of Poland. The building was also used by the Ministry of Former Prussian Partition (Ministerstwo byłej Dzielnicy Pruskiej). Some rooms were also used by the University of Poznań, Związek Harcerstwa Polskiego, and other organizations.

After the invasion of Poland and annexation of Greater Poland by Nazi Germany in 1939 at the start of World War II, the German occupiers decided to transform the castle into Adolf Hitler's residence. It was also used by the Gauleiter of the Wartheland, Arthur Greiser. According to this decision, Albert Speer prepared the project of the reconstruction, which completely changed the rooms of the castle. Most of the rooms were changed into the style of the Third Reich. The chapel was changed into the private cabinet of Hitler, with a characteristic balcony with an electric-heated floor. The cabinet was a copy of Hitler's room in the Reich Chancellery; the architectonic details of this room survived World War II and are often used in films. The Throne Room was also transformed into an audience hall. Under the castle, a bunker for 375 people was constructed. The rebuilding was stopped in 1943 due to setbacks on the Eastern Front.

During fighting in 1945, the castle was a temporary camp for German POWs, and was later used as a barracks by the Polish People's Army. During this period, the communist government considered the demolition of the castle as a symbol of the German occupation and bourgeois style. Due to a lack of funds, only some of the German symbols were removed and the upper part of the damaged tower was demolished.

During the war, the city hall and the seat of the town authorities were destroyed. The castle was renamed "New City Hall" (Nowy Ratusz) and later transformed into a center of culture. On 6 June 1979, the castle was declared a historical monument under the protection of the law.

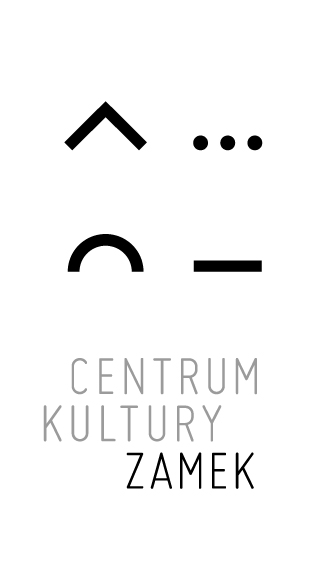
Modern logo of Zamek Culture Centre

Today, the Throne Room is used as a cinema room; other apartments contain art galleries, a puppet theater, pubs, music clubs, and restaurants. A courtyard is often a place of concerts and outdoor movie performances during summer. The second floor is still empty and has not been renovated.

The castle is the seat of the honorary consulates of the Philippines, Guatemala, and Slovakia.

The square in front of the building is the main venue for the St. Martin's Day parade and celebrations held in Poznań annually on 11 November (see Święty Marcin).

== See also ==
- Castles in Poland
- Royal Castle, Poznań
