= Franz Heinrich Schwechten =

German architect

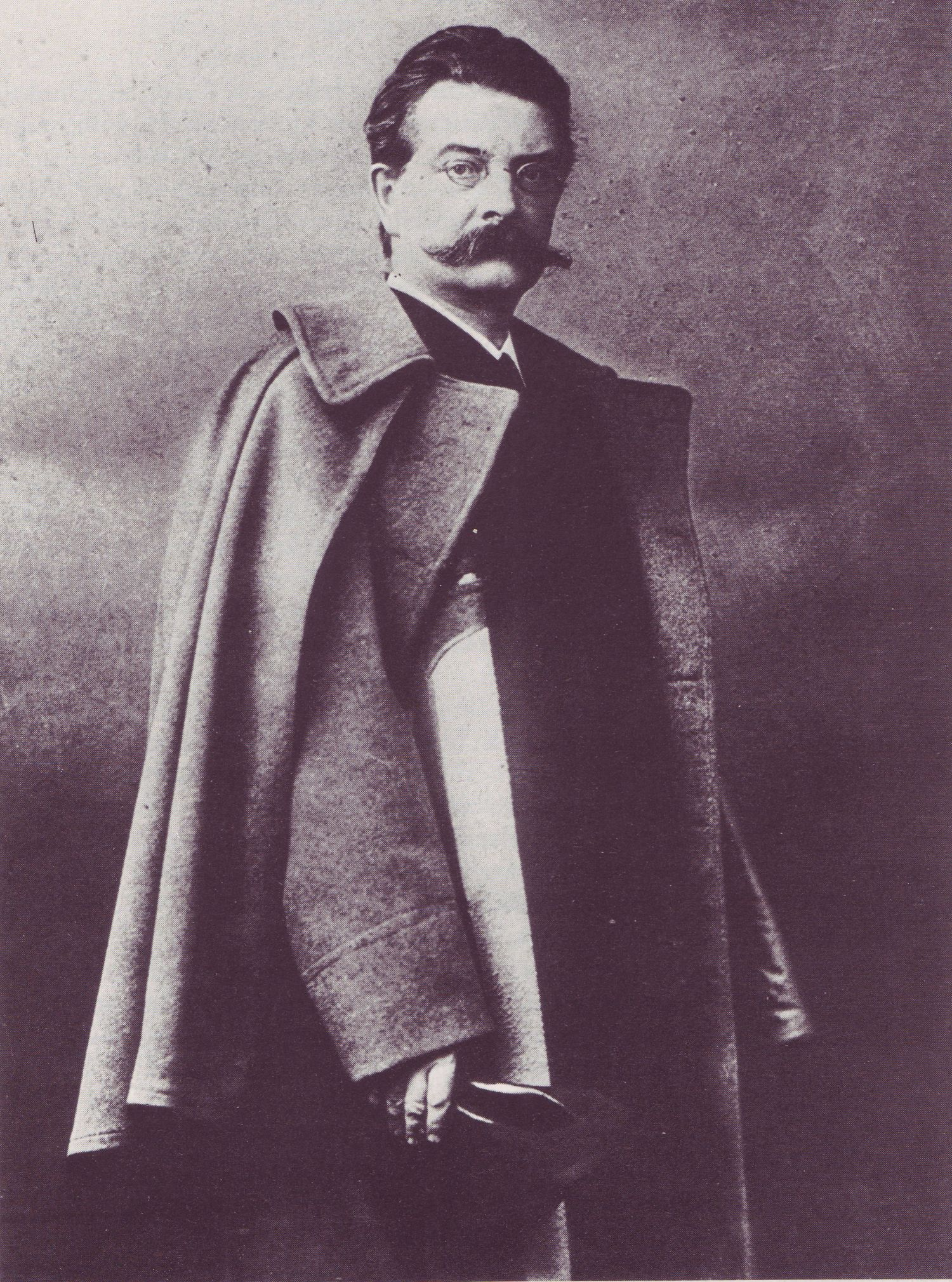
- Schwechten about 1895
- Born: Franz Heinrich Schwechten; 12 August 1841; Cologne, Rhine Province, Kingdom of Prussia
- Died: 11 August 1924 (aged 82); Berlin, Germany
- Occupation: Architect
- Buildings: Berlin Anhalter Bahnhof; Kaiser Wilhelm Memorial Church; Tiškevičiai Palace, Palanga; Imperial Castle in Poznań

Franz Heinrich Schwechten (12 August 1841 – 11 August 1924) was one of the most famous German architects of the Wilhelmine era, and contributed to the development of historicist architecture.

== Life ==
Schwechten was born in Cologne, the son of a district court judge. He attended Gymnasium, taking his Abitur in 1860, and went on to work as an apprentice of master builder Julius Carl Raschdorff, who would later design the new Berlin Cathedral. In 1861, Schwechten enrolled in the Bauakademie (Academy of Architecture) in Berlin, where he studied under Karl Bötticher and Friedrich Adler. During a practical training period following the completion of his studies in December 1863, Schwechten worked first for several months with Friedrich August Stüler, until May 1864, and then with Martin Gropius, until June 1865.

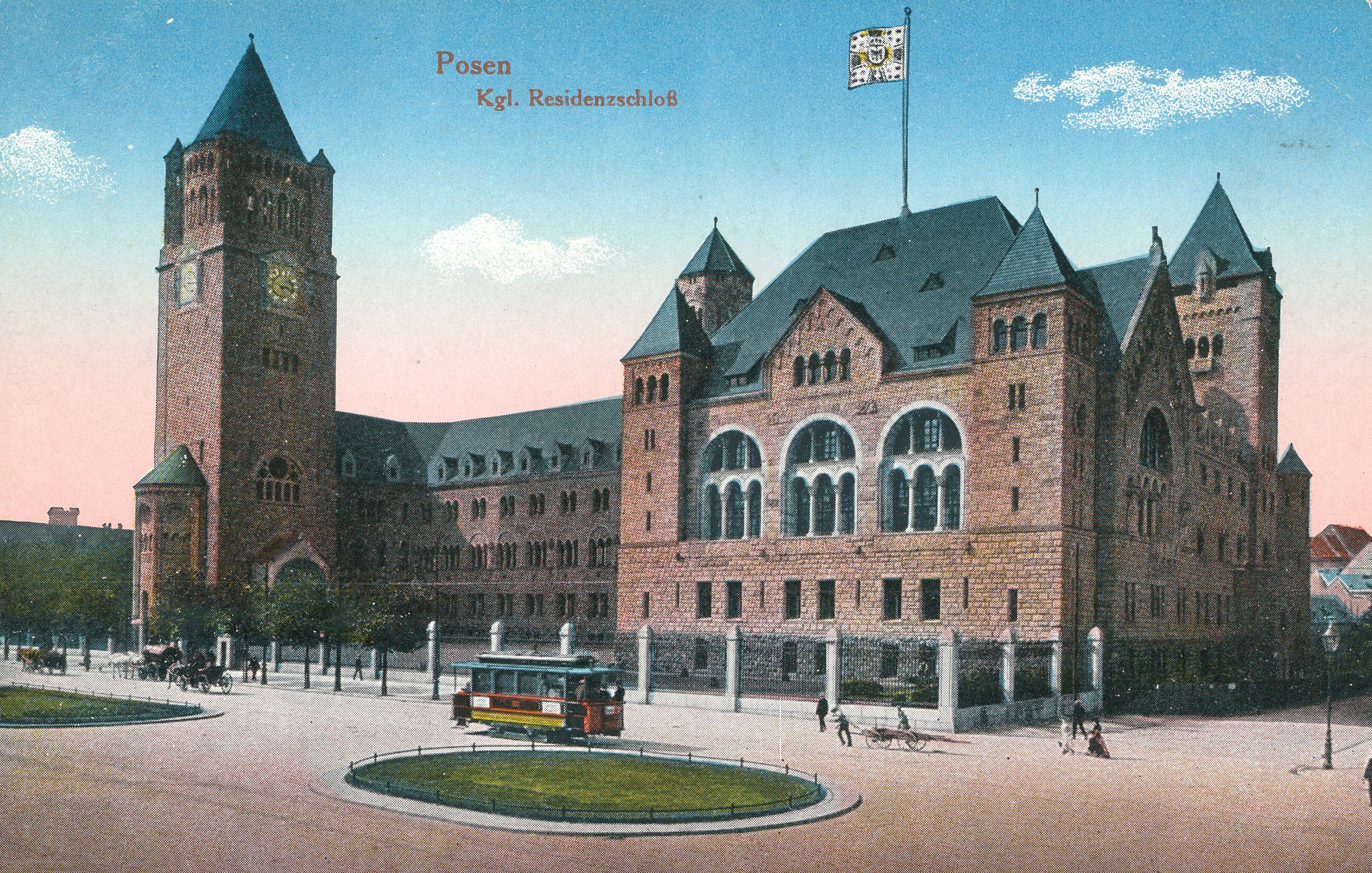
Imperial Castle, Poznań

In 1868, Schwechten received an award from the Berlin Architect's Union for the Neoclassical design of a Prussian Parliament building. The next year, he graduated as a master builder and began his career as chief architect of the Berlin-Anhalt Railway Company. His first major work was the monumental Anhalter Bahnhof terminus opened in 1880, then the largest station building in Continental Europe. Among his works were the designs of Tyszkiewicz Palace in Palanga (Polangen) and the Imperial Castle in Poznań (Posen). One of the most notable of Schwechten's designs was the Kaiser Wilhelm Memorial Church (completed in 1895), with its 113-metre-high (371 ft) tower and distinct Neo-Romanesque style elements.

Schwechten became a member of the Prussian Academy of Arts in 1885, and served as its president from 1915 to 1918. In 1904 he was honored with the title of "Geheimer Baurat" (privy building officer), and in 1906 he was named a professor. He served as a lecturer at the Royal Polytechnic University in Charlottenburg.

Schwechten died in Berlin and was buried in Schöneberg.

== Selected works ==
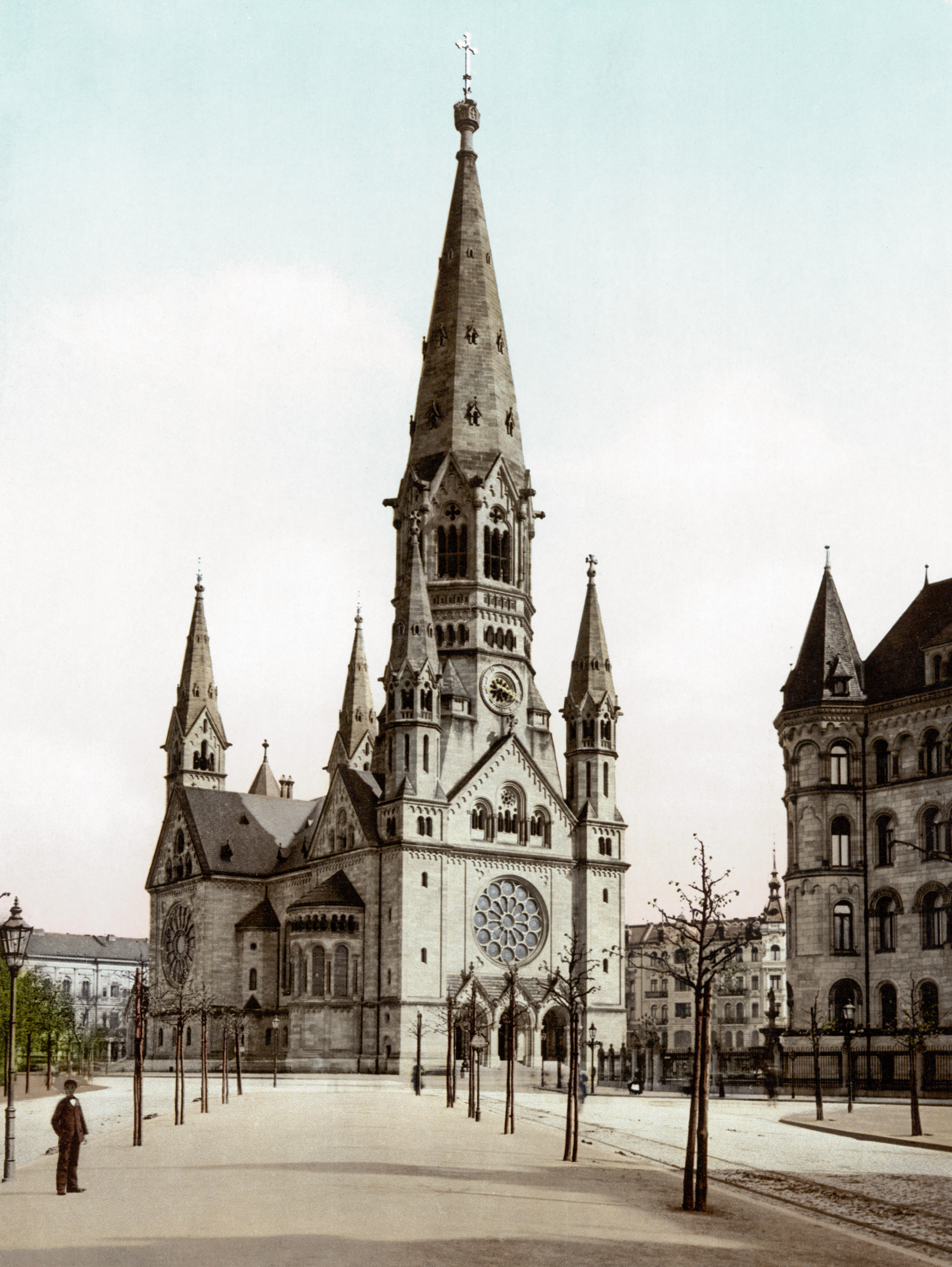
Kaiser Wilhelm Memorial Church, c. 1900

- Lutherstadt Wittenberg railway station building, 1877
- Berlin Anhalter Bahnhof, 1880, ruins except for portico blown up in 1959
- Prussian Military Academy, Berlin, 1883, ruins demolished in 1976
- Kaiser Wilhelm Memorial Church, Charlottenburg, 1895, tower preserved
- Tiškevičiai Palace, Palanga, 1897
- Grunewald Tower, 1899
- Romanesque House, Charlottenburg, 1901, destroyed in World War II
- Kaiserbrücke, Mainz, 1904, towers demolished
- Church of the Redeemer, Bad Homburg, 1908
- South Bridge (Cologne), 1910
- Imperial Castle in Poznań, 1910
- Hohenzollern Bridge, 1911, towers demolished
- Haus Vaterland, Berlin, 1912, ruins demolished in 1976
- Christuskirche, Rome, 1922
