= Kaiser Wilhelm Memorial Church =

Memorial Church
- Kaiser Wilhelm Memorial Church
- Gedächtniskirche; Kaiser-Wilhelm-Gedächtniskirche
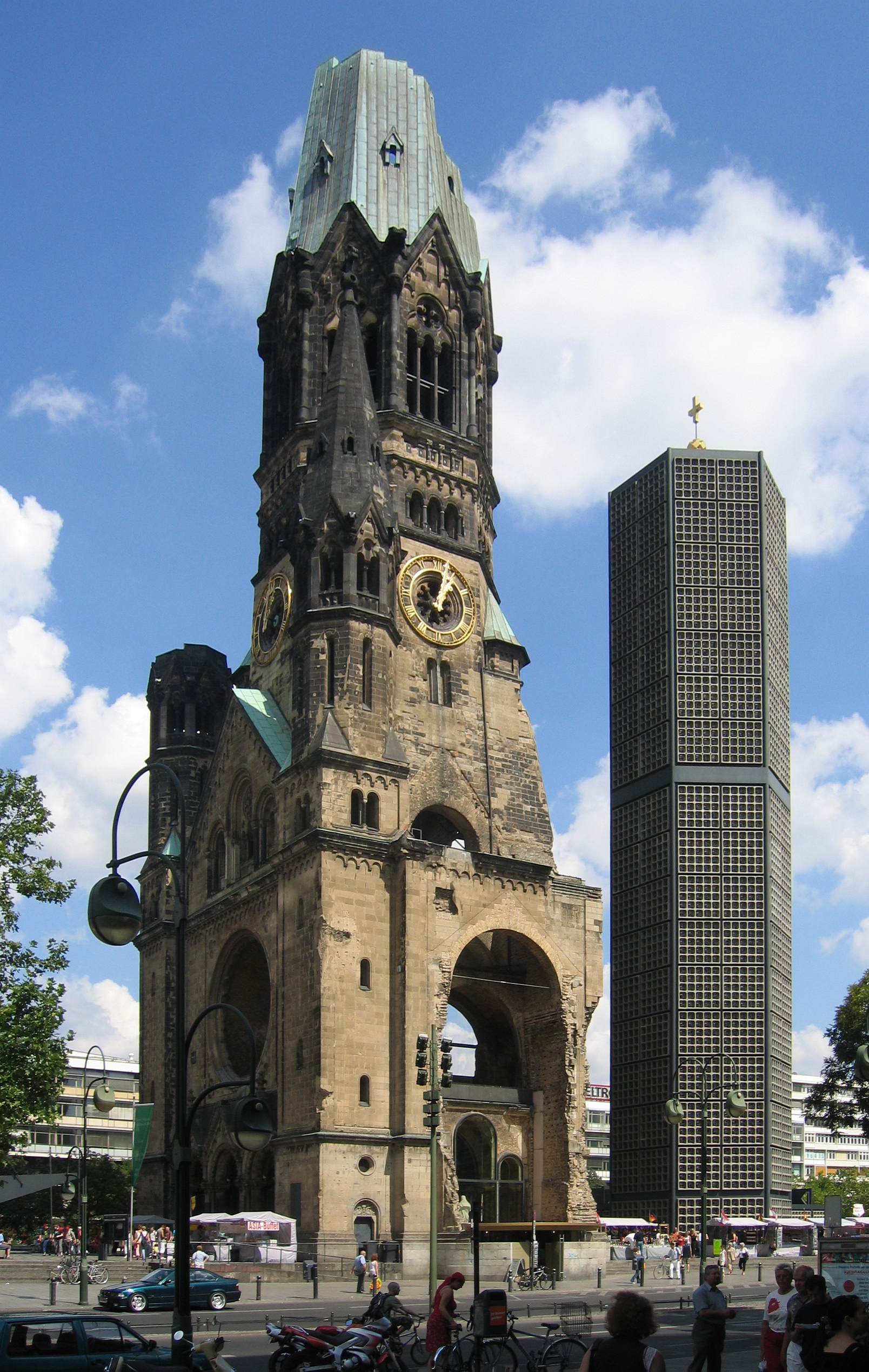
- Ruin of the imperial church, rebuilt as a reminder of World War II – the modern church's belfry, built in 1963, is visible to the right.
- Memorial Church
- 52°30′18″N 13°20′06″E
- Location: Breitscheidplatz; Berlin, Germany
- Denomination: Evangelical Church in Berlin, Brandenburg and Silesian Upper Lusatia
- Website: gedaechtniskirche-berlin.de

Architecture
- Architect(s): Franz Schwechten (original); Egon Eiermann (current)
- Style: Neo-Romanesque (original); Modernist (current)
- Years built: 1891–1906 (original); 1959–1963 (current)

The Kaiser Wilhelm Memorial Church (German: Kaiser-Wilhelm-Gedächtniskirche), mostly known simply as the Memorial Church (Gedächtniskirche [ɡəˈdɛçtnɪsˈkɪʁçə]) is a Protestant church affiliated with the Evangelical Church in Berlin, Brandenburg and Silesian Upper Lusatia, a regional body of the Protestant Church in Germany. It is located in the Bikini-Berlin building complex on the Kurfürstendamm in the centre of the Breitscheidplatz.

The original church on the site was built in the 1890s. It was badly damaged in a bombing raid in 1943. The present building, which consists of a church with an attached foyer and a separate belfry with an attached chapel, was built between 1959 and 1963. The damaged spire of the old church has been retained and its ground floor has been made into a memorial hall.

The Memorial Church today is a famous landmark of western Berlin, and is nicknamed by Berliners "der hohle Zahn", meaning "the hollow tooth".

== Old church ==
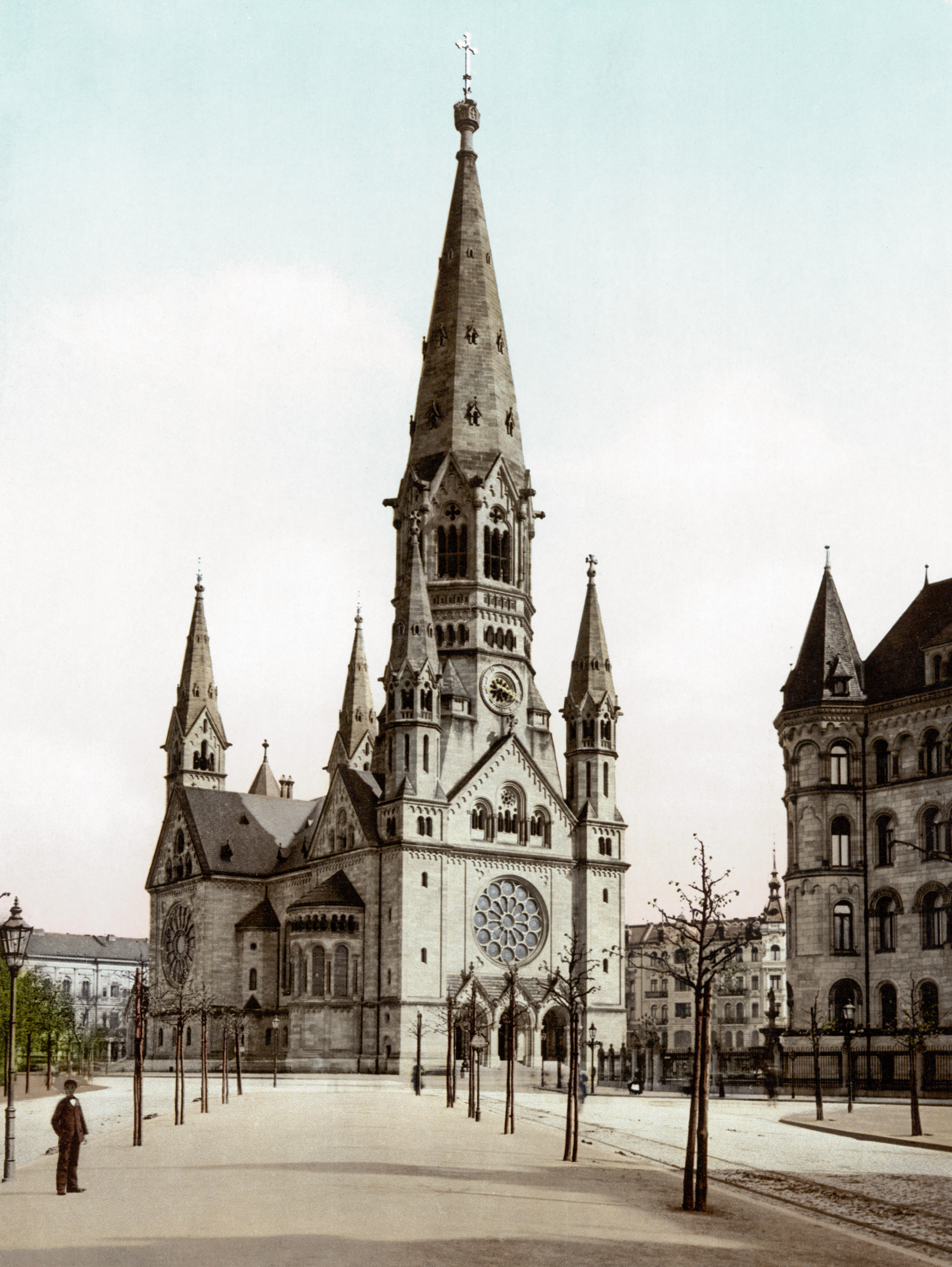
The old church around 1900

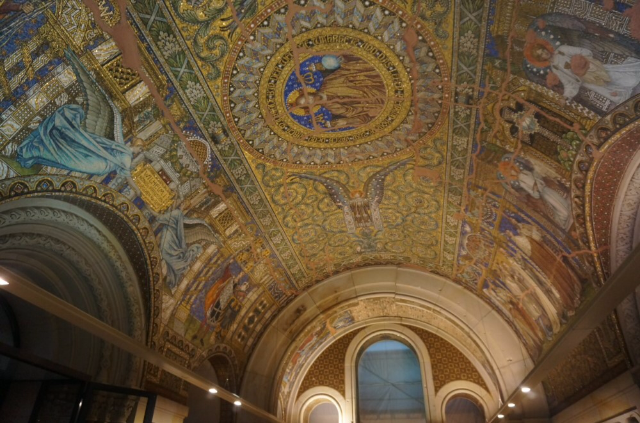
Mosaic in surviving portion of the old church

The construction of the church was part of a Protestant church-building programme initiated by Kaiser Wilhelm II and his consort Augusta Victoria to counter the German labour movement and socialist movement by a return to traditional religious values. Wilhelm II decided to name the church in honor of his grandfather Kaiser Wilhelm I. The competition for the design was won by Franz Schwechten, member of the Bauakademie who had distinguished himself with the design of the Anhalter Bahnhof. Schwechten, a native Rhinelander, planned for a large church to be built in a Neo-Romanesque style modelled on the Bonn Minster with a Tuff stone facade. His design included 2,740 square metres (29,500 sq ft) of wall mosaic, a 113 metres (371 ft)-high spire (now 71 metres, or 233 ft) and a nave which seated over 2,000 people.

The foundation stone was laid on 22 March 1891, which was Wilhelm I's birthday. The church was dedicated on 1 September 1895, the eve of the Day of Sedan. At that time, the entrance hall in the lower section had not yet been completed; that part of the church was not opened and consecrated until 22 February 1906. Construction costs mounted to 6.8 million gold mark, raised primarily through donations. The church design, quite unfamiliar in the Brandenburg region, inspired several architectural projects in the surrounding area, like the Romanisches Café building, also designed by Schwechten.

In World War II, on the night of 22 November 1943, the church was extensively damaged in an air raid. Yet it was by no means beyond repair. A remnant of the spire and much of the entrance hall survived intact, as did the altar and the baptistry. After the war, in 1947, the curatorium of the Kaiser-Wilhelm-Gedächtniskirche foundation (Stiftung) decided in favor of rebuilding the church, but the manner in which this should be done was contentiously debated until the late 1950s. In a two-phased design competition in 1956, the question of whether the secured remnant of the spire should be torn down or preserved was left open. The competition's winner, architect Egon Eiermann, initially proposed, in both his submissions, for the remnant of the old spire to be torn down, in favor of a completely new construction but that plan provoked a public outcry in which the ruined tower was characterized as the "heart of Berlin"; as a result Eiermann revised the design to preserve the tower. He had most of the remaining structure pulled down, in order to build the modern church that now occupies most of the site.

== New church ==
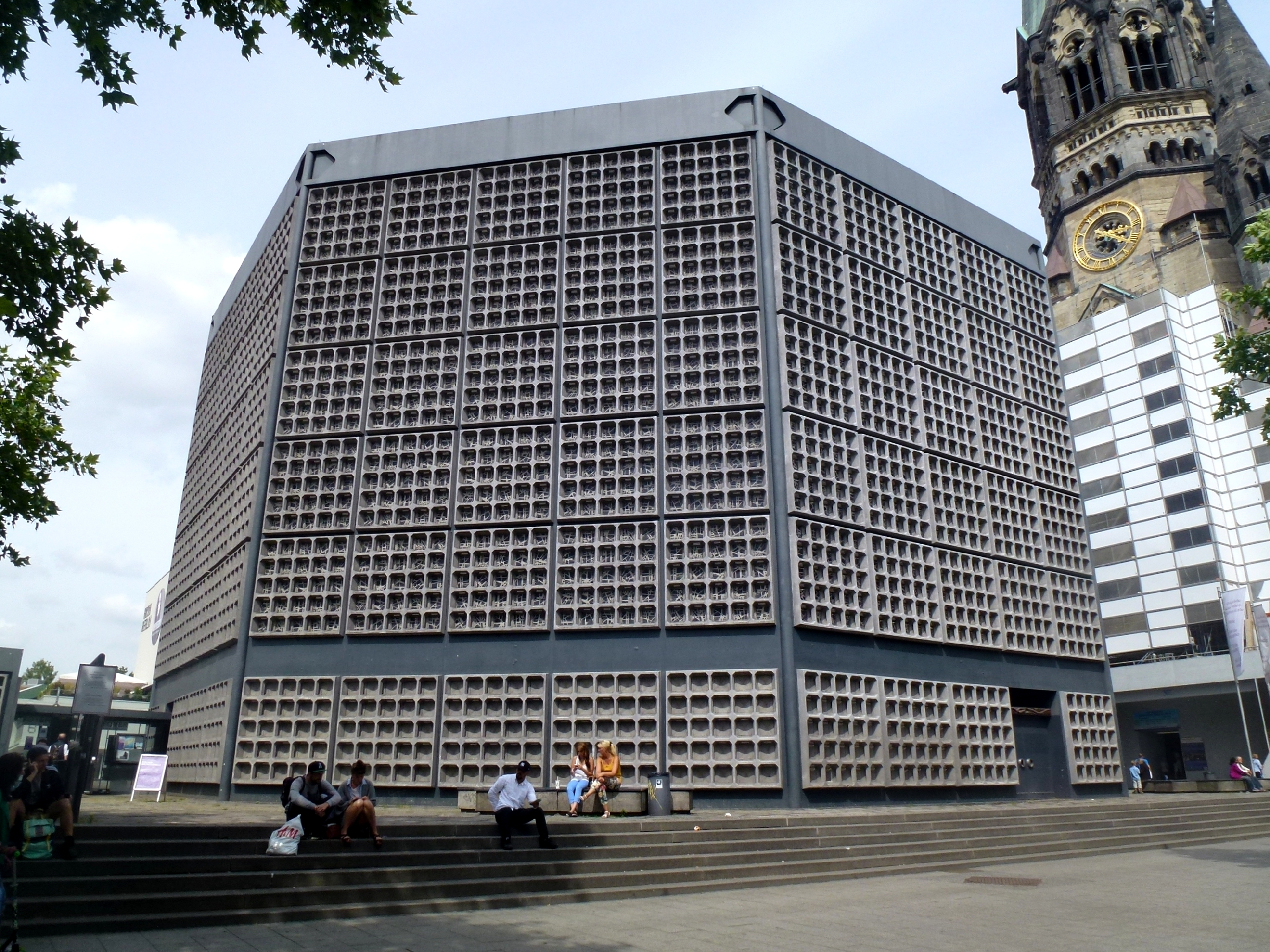
Exterior of the new church

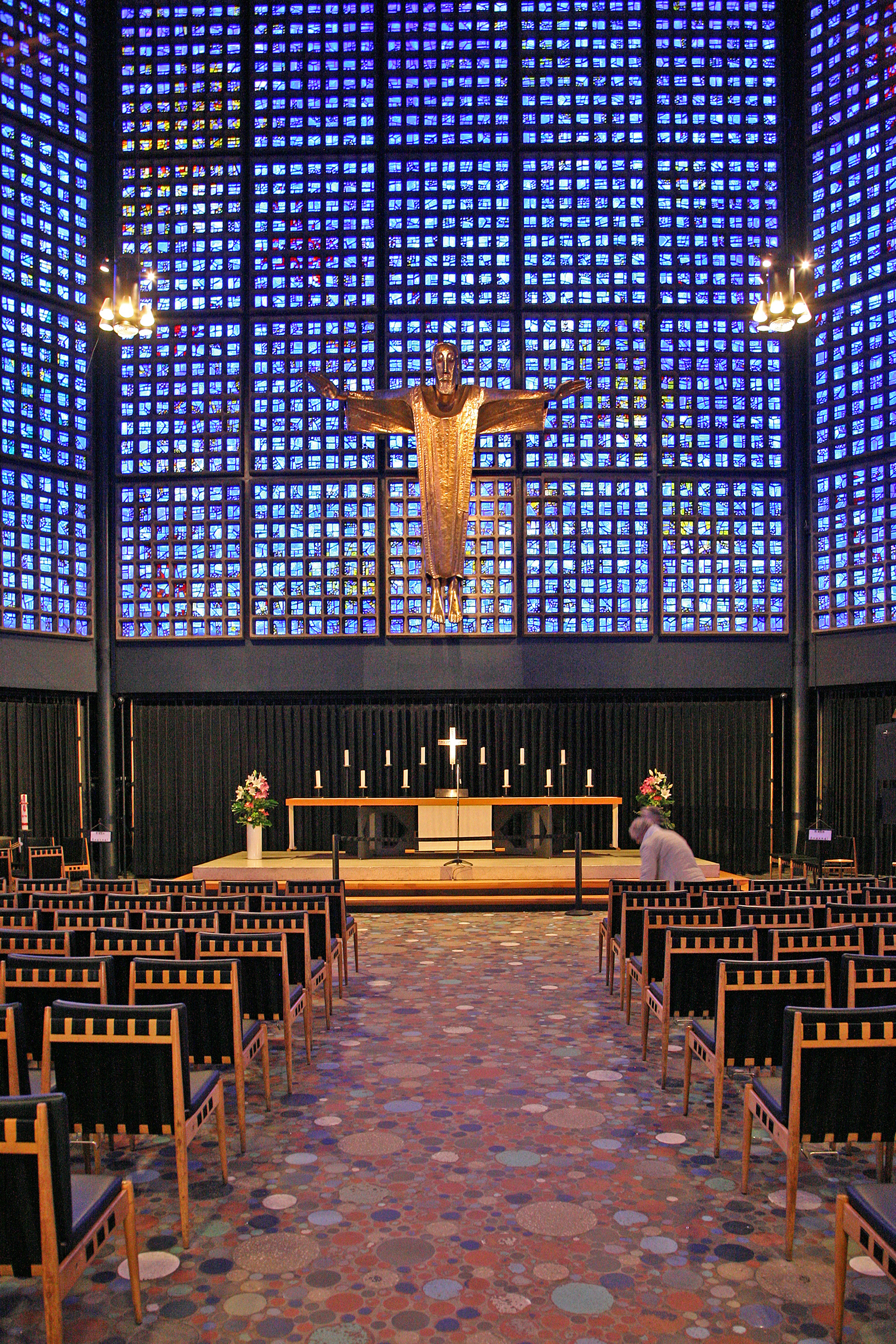
Interior of the new church

The new church was rebuilt in 1961. The new church was designed by Eiermann and consists of four buildings grouped around the remaining ruins of the old church. The initial design included the demolition of the spire of the old church but following pressure from the public, it was decided to incorporate it into the new design. The four buildings comprise, on the west of the ruins, the new church with a foyer to its west, and to the east of the ruins, a tower with a chapel to its northeast. The plan of the church is octagonal while the plan of the tower is hexagonal. These components are sited on a plateau measuring 100 metres long and 40 metres wide. The new buildings are constructed of concrete, steel and glass. The walls of the church are made of a concrete honeycomb containing 21,292 stained glass inlays. The glass, designed by Gabriel Loire, was inspired by the colours of the glass in Chartres Cathedral. The predominant colour is blue, with small areas of ruby red, emerald green and yellow. The church is 35 metres in diameter and 20.5 metres high with a capacity of over 1,000. Because of the distinctive appearance of the new buildings, it is sometimes nicknamed Lippenstift und Puderdose (the lipstick and the powder box) by Berliners, or alternatively "the gasometer" and "the factory chimney".

Inside the church, opposite the entrance, a figure of the resurrected Christ is suspended above the altar. This is made from tombak and was designed by Karl Hemmeter. The cross on the altar, by Peter Tauchnitz, is of gilt silver with 37 rock crystals. To the left of the altar is the baptismal font on a stand filled with Carrara marble which contains a majolica bowl for the holy water. To the right of the altar is an octagonal pulpit. Opposite the altar on a gallery is an organ containing about 5,000 pipes, which was built by Karl Schuke. Plexiglas panels have been installed over the organ gallery to improve the acoustics. By the northeast wall of the church are three works of art. The first is a bronze plaque commemorating the Protestant martyrs who died during the Nazi regime between 1933 and 1945. It incorporates a Spanish wooden crucifix dating from the 13th century. The plaque was placed in the church on 20 July 1964, the 20th anniversary of an attempt to assassinate Hitler. Next to this is the Stalingrad Madonna, a symbol of hope and reconciliation. This is a charcoal drawing made by Kurt Reuber during the time he was trapped inside Stalingrad at Christmas 1942. Copies of this drawing have been sent to Coventry Cathedral and the Russian Orthodox Church in Stalingrad (now Volgograd). The third item of art is an icon of the Virgin Mary from Volgograd.

The tower is 12 metres in diameter and 53.5 metres high with a flat roof. Atop the tower is a pole carrying a gilded sphere above which is a gilded cross. It contains a belfry with six bronze bells cast from French cannon, booty from the Franco-Prussian War of 1870–71. The foundation stone of the new church was laid on 9 May 1959, its roofing ceremony was carried out on 16 December 1960, the new bells were consecrated on 19 July 1961, the new church was consecrated on 17 December 1961 and the foyer and chapel were completed in December 1963.

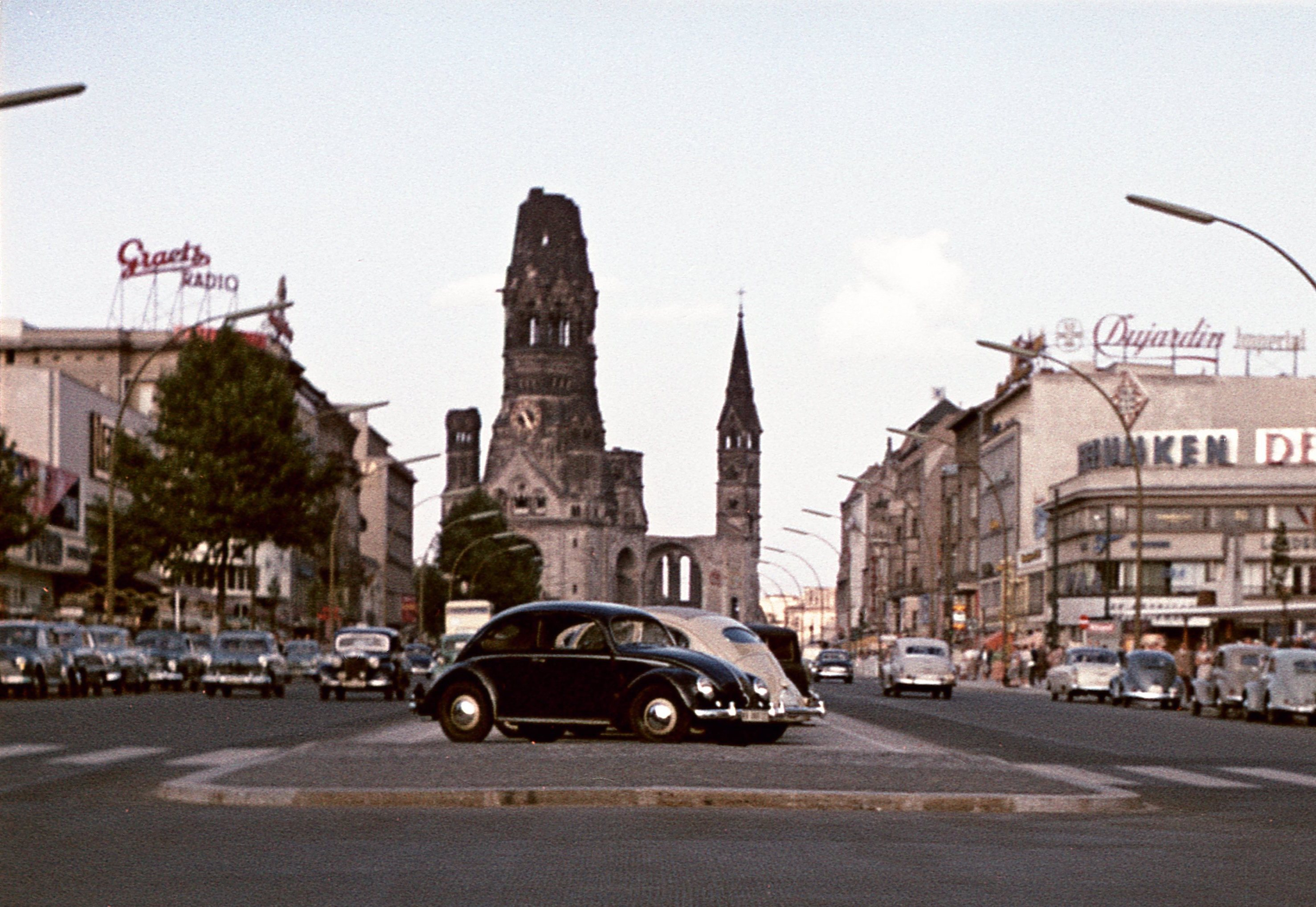
The old church in the 1950s

== Bells of the new church ==
In 1894, Kaiser Wilhelm II donated 50,000 pounds of bronze from captured cannons to cast a new bell for the church. Five bells were made in the same year in the Franz Schilling court bell foundry in Apolda. The largest bell or bourdon is named Queen Luise & Kaiser Wilhelm I and it weighs 13,230 kg. The bell was the largest of its kind in Germany. When the bells arrived in Berlin on 1 June 1895, they were driven through the city in a ceremonial procession and consecrated on 18 June by General Superintendent Faber. Before a bell was installed around 1900, around 20 bell ringers were needed to get the whole bell ringing. After World War I the bells were free, but a few decades later they were no longer so lucky. Between 1942 and 1943 the larger bells were removed for melting down for wartime purposes, while the smallest was allowed to remain on the tower as a ringing bell. When the church went down in a hail of bombs in November 1943, the last remaining bell was severely damaged. In 1949 they were sent back to Apolda. The bell's further fate is unknown, but it can be assumed that it was melted down. However, the ruins of the Kaiser Wilhelm Memorial Church were not to remain entirely without bells. In 1954, three iron bells were ordered from the Franz Weeren iron works, which were to serve as clock strike bells from then on. For a long time they did not do their job, because in the course of the new construction of the church a correspondingly representative ringing was desired. In 1960 the time had come: at the Rincker bell and art foundry in Sinn, a 6-part bell and a carillon were created for the old tower. On 24 December 1960, two of the three iron bells were installed at the Philipp Melanchthon Church in Berlin's Neukölln quarter; what happened to the third is unknown. On 19 July 1961 the new bells and the newly built campanile were inaugurated and put into operation. The bell's sound is affected by its clearly progressive rib, and from the tower's acoustics. The bells were inscribed with bible verses.

Different bells are rung on different occasions:

- Devotions, family worship, baptisms and marriages: Bells 6, 5 and 4
- Organ Vespers and funerals: Bells 6, 5, 4 and 3
- Sunday worship: Bells 6, 5, 4, 3 and 2
- Festive services: All bells (6–1)

Number	Year cast	Foundry	Diameter (mm)	Weight (kg)	Note (ST–1/16)	Inscription (German)	Inscription (English)
1	1960	Glocken- und Kunstgießerei Rincker, Sinn	2140	5740	g^{0} +1	Eure Städte sind mit Feuer verbrannt Aber mein Heil bleibt ewiglich, und meine Gerechtigkeit wird kein Ende haben	Your cities were charred by fire'.Yet my salvation remains eternal, and my righteousness will have no end
2	1960	Glocken- und Kunstgießerei Rincker, Sinn	1818	3593	b^{0} +3	Er vergilt uns nicht nach unserer Missetat	He does not repay us according to our iniquities'
3	1960	Glocken- und Kunstgießerei Rincker, Sinn	1648	2854	c^{1} +4	Gott, dein Weg ist heilig	God, your way is holy
4	1960	Glocken- und Kunstgießerei Rincker, Sinn	1473	2000	d^{1} +4	Hilf deinem Volk und segne dein Erbe	Help your people and bless your inheritance
5	1960	Glocken- und Kunstgießerei Rincker, Sinn	1405	1807	e♭^{1} +4	So sind wir nun Botschafter an Christi Statt; denn Gott vermahnt durch uns; so bitten wir an Christi Statt: Lasset euch versöhnen mit Gott!	We are therefore Christ's ambassadors, as though God were making his appeal through us. We implore you on Christ's behalf: Be reconciled to God!'
6	1960	Glocken- und Kunstgießerei Rincker, Sinn	1279	1453	f^{1} +3	Seid fleißig zu halten die Einigkeit im Geist durch das Band des Friedens	Be steadfast to uphold the unity of the spirit through the bond of peace

== Spire and memorial hall ==
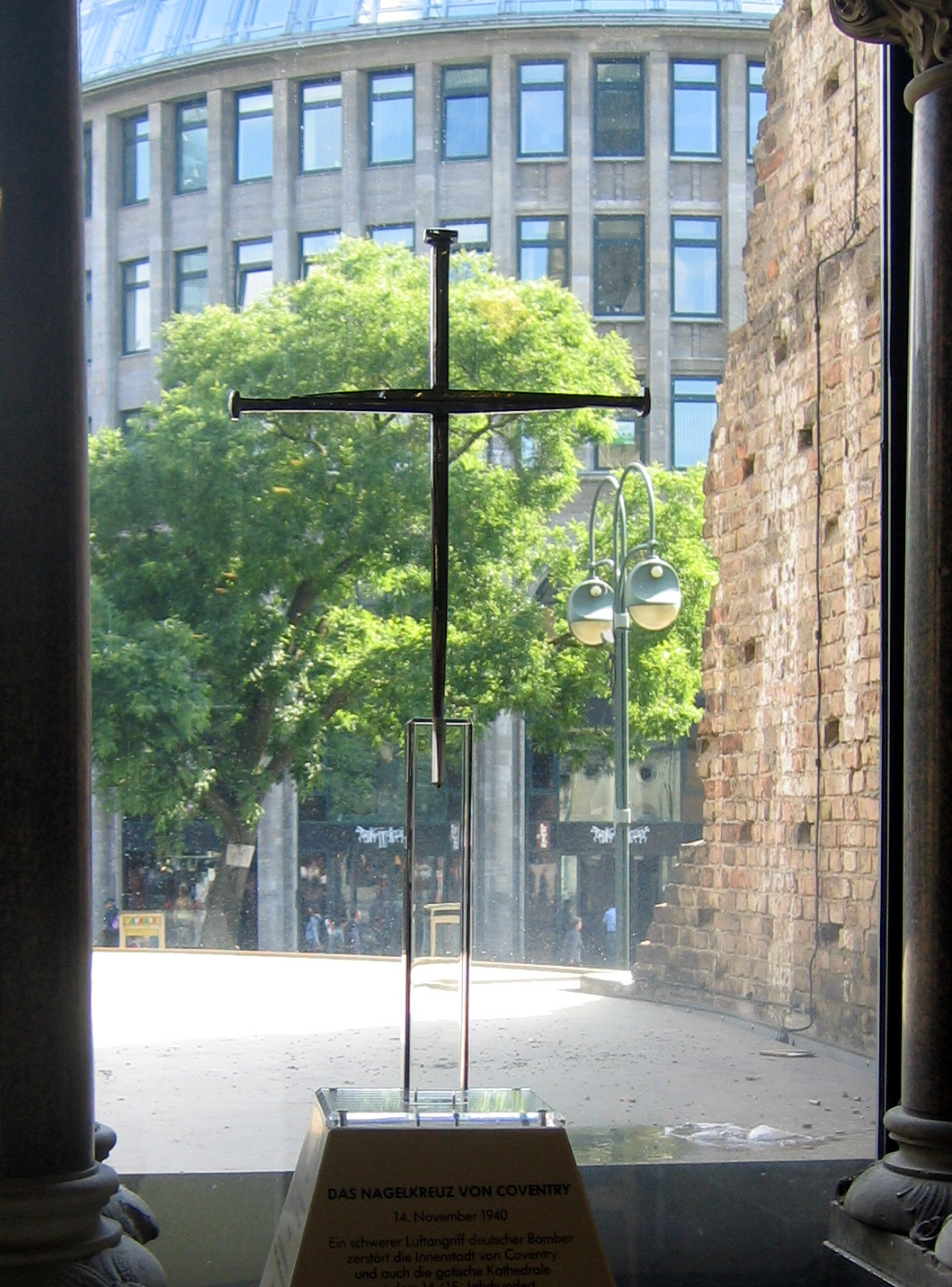
Cross of nails from Coventry Cathedral

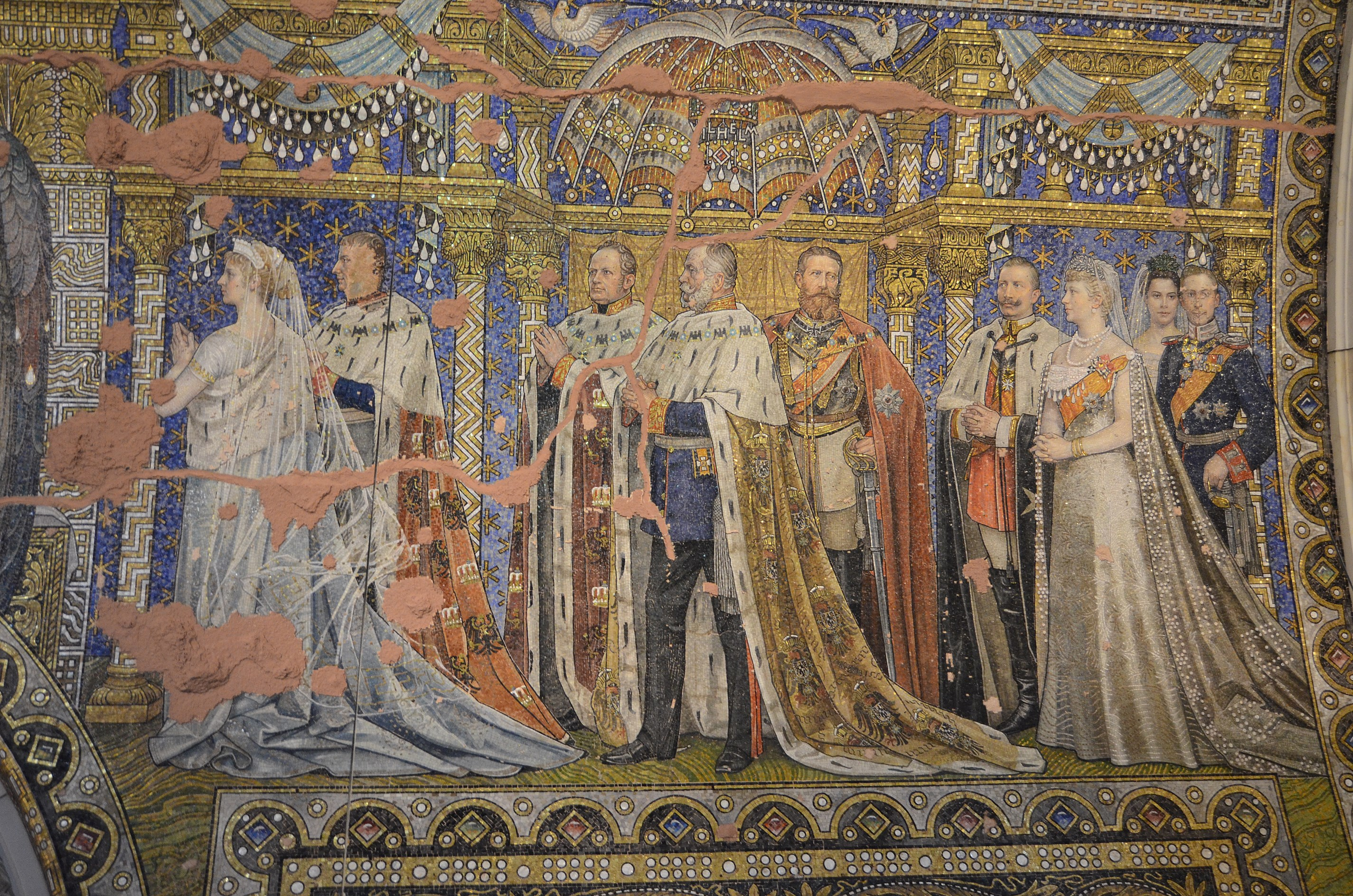
Upper part with Quadriga – interior – preserved mosaic

The entrance hall in the base of the damaged spire was reopened to visitors, having been consecrated on 7 January 1987. Its floor contains a mosaic of the Archangel Michael fighting the dragon. The vault shows a procession of Hohenzollern princes, designed by Hermann Schaper, and includes a depiction of Crown Prince Wilhelm who never became king after his father, Wilhelm II, abdicated the throne in 1918. Other mosaics show important monarchs in medieval Germany, Reformation thinkers and Reformation princes. Bas-relief sculptures illustrate scenes from biblical stories (Jacob wrestling with the angel, Jesus in the garden of Gethsemane, and the pietà), scenes from the life of Kaiser Wilhelm I and symbolic figures representing war and peace. In the north apse are 16 display panels which tell the story of the old church and its destruction. At the opposite end of the hall are three items which symbolise the history of the church. In the middle is a damaged statue of Christ which originally stood on the altar of the old church. To its right is the Cross of Nails which was made from nails in the roof timbers of Coventry Cathedral, which had been severely damaged in a German air raid on 14 November 1940. To the left of the statue of Christ is an icon cross which was given by the Russian Orthodox Church and handed over in 1988. Outside the hall are four sandstone figures made by Stefan Kaehne.

In December 2007, Charles Jeffrey Gray, a former British pilot who carried out World War II bombing raids over Germany, joined a campaign to rescue the Kaiser Wilhelm Memorial Church from decay. After reading about the condition of the Church, Gray contacted Wolfgang Kuhla, the chairman of the church's advisory board, urging that its tower be restored. In response, a fund was launched to help raise the costs of its repair.

== See also ==
- Battle of Berlin (RAF campaign)
- Bombing of Berlin in World War II
- Coventry Blitz
