= Wittenbergplatz =

Square in Berlin, Germany

Coordinates: 52°30′07″N 13°20′34″E

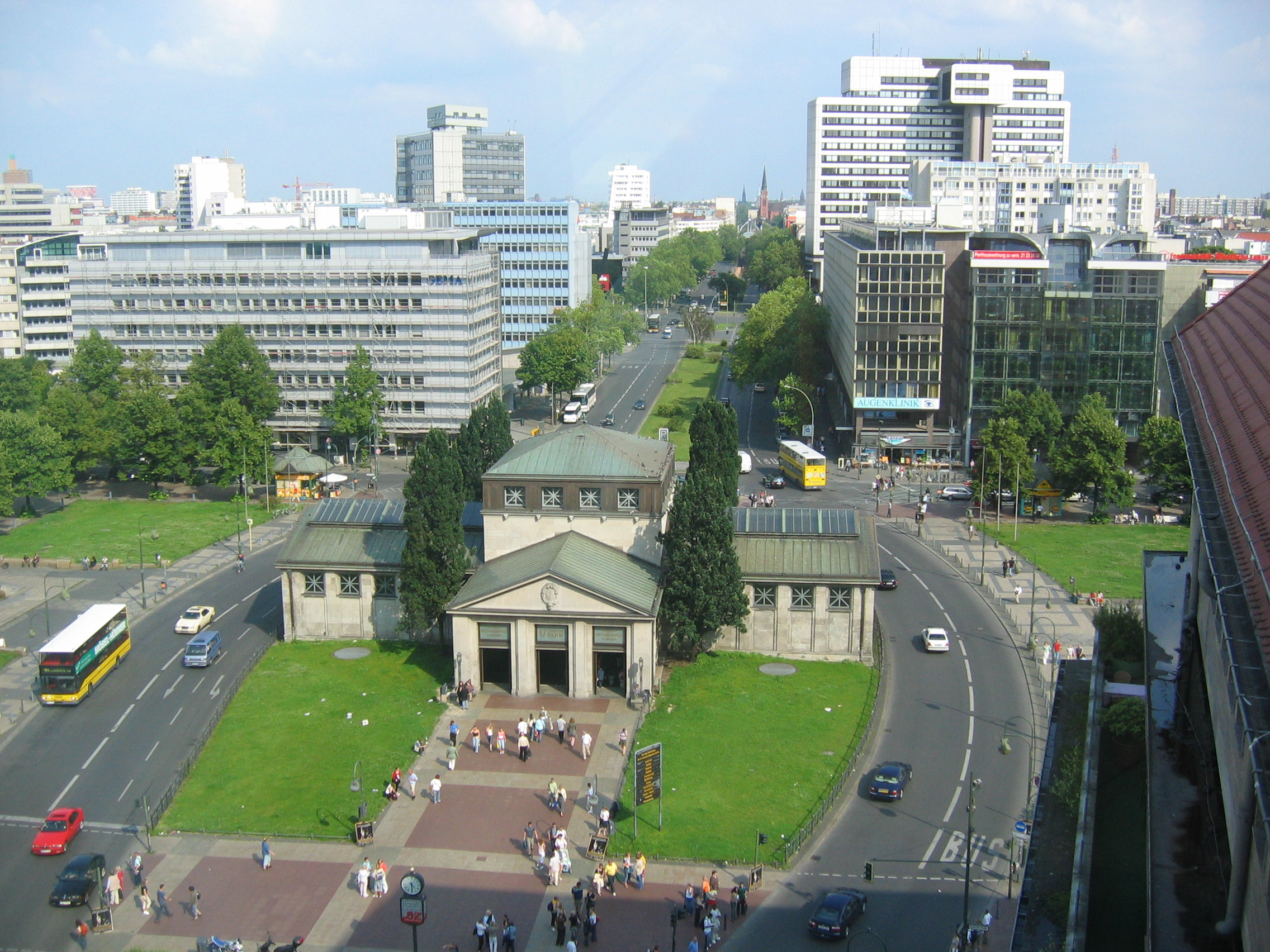
Wittenbergplatz as seen from the top floor of KaDeWe

Wittenbergplatz is a square in the central Schöneberg district of Berlin, Germany. One of the main plazas in the "City West" area, it is known for the large Kaufhaus des Westens (KaDeWe) department store on its southwestern side.

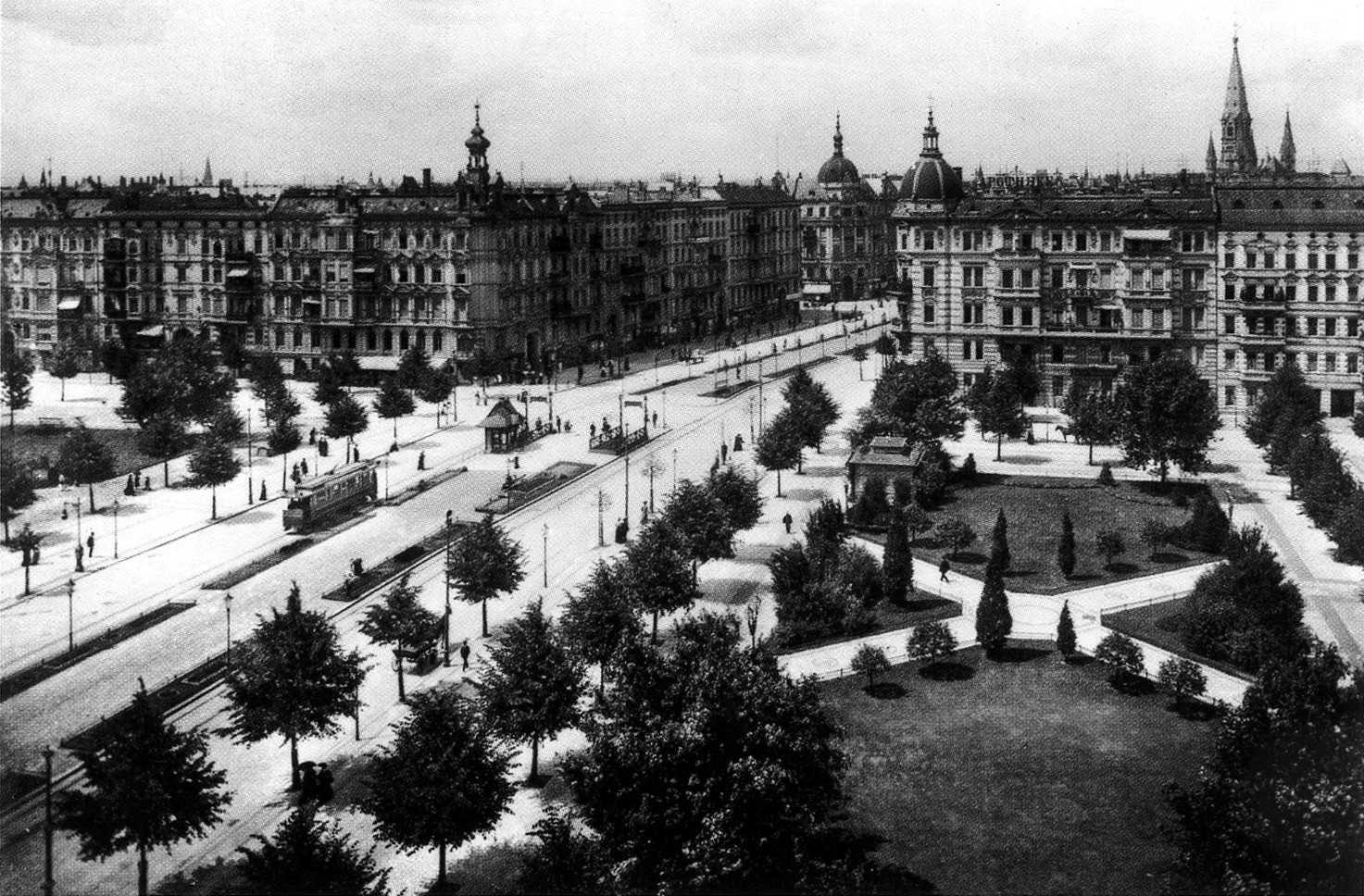
Wittenbergplatz, 1904

It was laid out between 1889 and 1892 in the course of the urban development in the western suburbs of Berlin's Wilhelmine Ring according to the Hobrecht-Plan. The square was then part of a major boulevard running from Kreuzberg to Charlottenburg with numerous sections named after victorious commanders in the German Campaign during the Napoleonic Wars, colloquially called Generalszug. The westernmost section was named Tauentzienstraße after General Bogislav von Tauentzien, who had received the honorific title von Wittenberg after the storming of the French-occupied town of Wittenberg on 14 February 1814 (although General Lieutenant Leopold Wilhelm von Dobschütz had actually led the Prussian troops). Therefore, the adjacent square got the name Wittenbergplatz.

Since then, the square forms the eastern terminus of Tauentzienstraße, today a major shopping street, connecting it with Breitscheidplatz in the west. In 1902 Wittenbergplatz station opened on the first Berlin U-Bahn line (Stammstrecke); ten years later, it was rebuilt including an impressive entrance hall in the centre of the square, designed by Alfred Grenander. The KaDeWe department store opened in 1907 on the corner of Wittenbergplatz and Tauentzienstraße, it is today the largest department store in Continental Europe. The northern side of the square is home to street markets four times a week. The south side of the square features the fountain Lebensalter.
