= James Hobrecht =

Prussian urban planner (1825-1902)

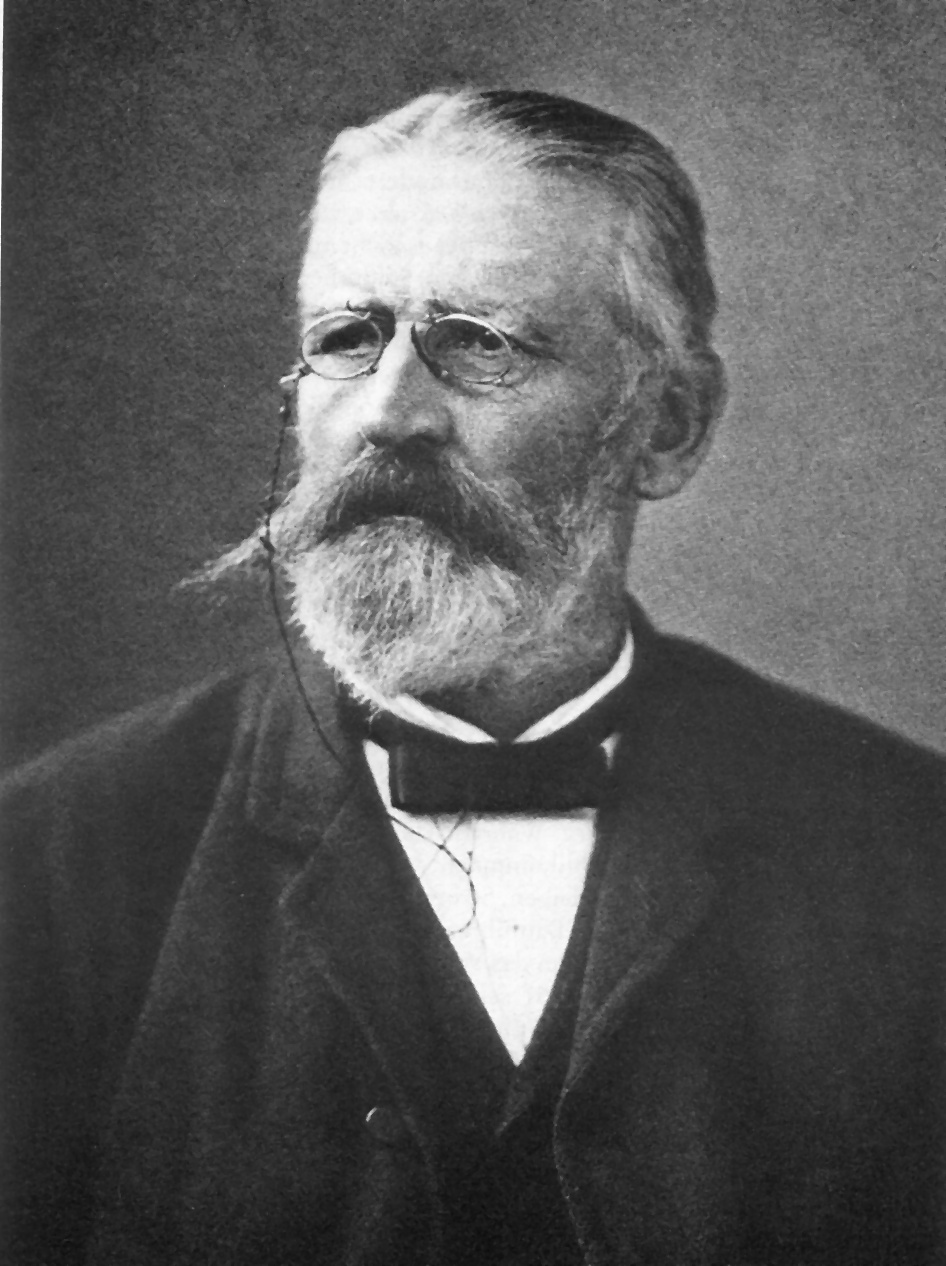
James Hobrecht (photography around 1890)

James Friedrich Ludolf Hobrecht (31 December 1825 in Memel – 8 September 1902 in Berlin) was a Prussian director for urban planning. His development plan of 1862 for a million-sized Berlin was soon to be simply called the Hobrecht-Plan. His main focus was on modern sewer, systems for which he was well known in the late 19th century.

== Biography ==
Hobrecht was born as the son of the estate owner Ludolph Hobrecht and his wife Isabella (born Johnson) in East Prussian Memel. His elder brother, Arthur Hobrecht, would later become the mayor of Berlin. In 1834, his father was called to the royal economic council, and the family moved to Königsberg. In 1841, Hobrecht broke off his school education and began an apprenticeship as a geodesist (professional land surveyor) for which he passed an examination in 1845. Until 1847, he was engaged in separation work (clearing the pathway of transportation projects from rocks and hills) in East Prussia as well as on the Cologne-Minden Railway. During the German revolutions of 1848, he served in the student guards at the Berlin Palace.

By 1847, he had started studies at the Berlin Bauakademie (one of the institutes that would later form the Technische Universität Berlin). While at the building academy, he was an active member of the "Akademischer Verein 'Motiv'" student association. The fraternity was originally a loose group of students interested in arts and philosophy, founded in 1847 as a chorus. Along with the rise of the academy, it quickly grew in size and influence on contemporary architecture. Being at the academy, he attended a variety of courses until his examination as "Bauführer" (academic site manager) in 1849. Right after the examination, he joined the "Architekten- und Ingenieur-Verein zu Berlin" professional association of architects in Berlin. He held different management positions in the circle until he was called off to the infantry regiment in the Electorate of Hesse in 1850.

His first professional work is recorded with the building of the "Packhof" in Königsberg in 1851. In 1852, there are records of managing the Dirschkeim estate in Samland. On 4 February 1853, he married Henriette Wolff. The couple had three sons and four daughters in the coming years.

James Hobrecht continued his studies in civil engineering with records of field placements at the Prussian Eastern Railway in 1857. In 1858, he passed an examination in transportation planning (Wasser-, Wege- und Eisenbahnbaumeister) and found employment at the Royal Prussian urban planning administration (Baupolizei) in the same year. In that role, he was commanded in 1859 to head the commission on the creation of a land-use plan for Berlin and its environs. As part of his job, he traveled to Hamburg, Paris, and London in 1860 to learn about the contemporary development status in urban planning, especially their sewer systems. Before the plan was finished the city came to an amalgamation of its suburbs on 1. January 1861. Based on the just finished land surveys and existing land-use proposals, James Hobrecht constructed a map showing a possible land-use for a city at a projected size of 1.5 to 2 million inhabitants. The map of building lines was soon to be called the Hobrecht-Plan, but he was not able to continue on the details due to his dismissal on 15. December 1861, even before the resolution of the planning works on 18. July 1862.

The reasons for the job termination are unknown. He went to Stettin to construct the water supply system for the city and to create plans for a modern sewer system which was started to be built in 1870. Before the project was realized in Stettin, he was able to return to Berlin in 1869, where he was commissioned to build a sewer system for the city. This was enabled by his brother Arthur Hobrecht, who became lord mayor of Berlin in 1872, and Rudolf Virchow, who had already been a famous medical doctor and influential liberal politician. He laid out plans for a radial system of 12 main routes of canalization from the city to new sewage farms on the outskirts of Berlin. Soon after his brother took office, the grand pipes were constructed from 1873 until the last one in 1893. While the works were ongoing, he was called to help with the planning of the sewer systems of 30 German cities and the sewer systems in Moscow, Tokyo, and Cairo.

From 1872 to 1874, he had a teaching assignment at the Bauakademie. In 1885, he was elected to head the municipal urban planning department, a position that he held for 12 years. Most of the embankments of the river Spree were built under his leadership allowing, larger ships to pass through the city. In 1897, he retired for health reasons. In the same year, he was honored with the title of "Stadtältester von Berlin". He remained in the city until his death in 1902. His grave can be found on the Friedhof II der Sophiengemeinde Berlin.

== Influence and legacy ==
When James Hobrecht was commanded to head the urban planning commission for Berlin in 1859, he was just 34 years old, and he had only minor experience compared to the size of the project, which included 14 chapters. Actually, he was just replacing a colleague who had fallen sick at the time. The shortcomings of the crowded Mietskaserne tenement blocks were largely attributed to that fact by historians in the early 20th century. Even the deadly street fights of fascist and communist squadrons in those areas have been traced back to the Hobrecht-Plan that he created at that time. Modern historians are more favourable as his writings also include chapters on estimates of the social consequences, and his planning was good enough for later reformations that allowed Berlin to grow successfully.

In 1868, he published the influential paper "Ueber öffentliche Gesundheitspflege und die Bildung eines Central-Amts für öffentliche Gesundheitspflege im Staate" (on the public health issues and the founding of a central office in the government) that was spawned by a cholera epidemic at the time. He is still favouring the "Durcheinanderwohnen" (mixed class housing) in the tenement areas but criticizes the catastrophic housing conditions that had developed in the Wilhelmine Ring of Berlin. He finds support from Rudolph Virchow, who had the same agenda on improving public health and housing conditions. With his wide knowledge on sewer systems and land-use for its pipes, he is the technician who is in need to bring these reform ideas into reality.

Soon after his return to Berlin, he was one of the founders of the "Deutsche Vierteljahrsschrift für öffentliche Gesundheitspflege" (Quarterly Magazine on Public Health) in 1869. Between 1870 and 1879 he published 13 issues of "Reinigung und Entwässerung von Berlin. Einleitende Verhandlungen und Berichte über mehrere auf Veranlassung des Magistrats der Königlichen Haupt- und Residenzstadt Berlin angestellte Versuche und Untersuchungen" (water treatment and sewer systems of Berlin. Introduction and reports on experiments and studies on request of the municipal government of Berlin). When the Berlin sewer system started to work successfully, with much of an improvement to the inhabitants of Berlin, he became a well-known expert in the field, helping later with the planning in Moscow in 1880, in Tokyo in 1886, and in Cairo in 1892.
