= Tauentzienstraße =

Street in Berlin, Germany

- Tauentzienstrasse
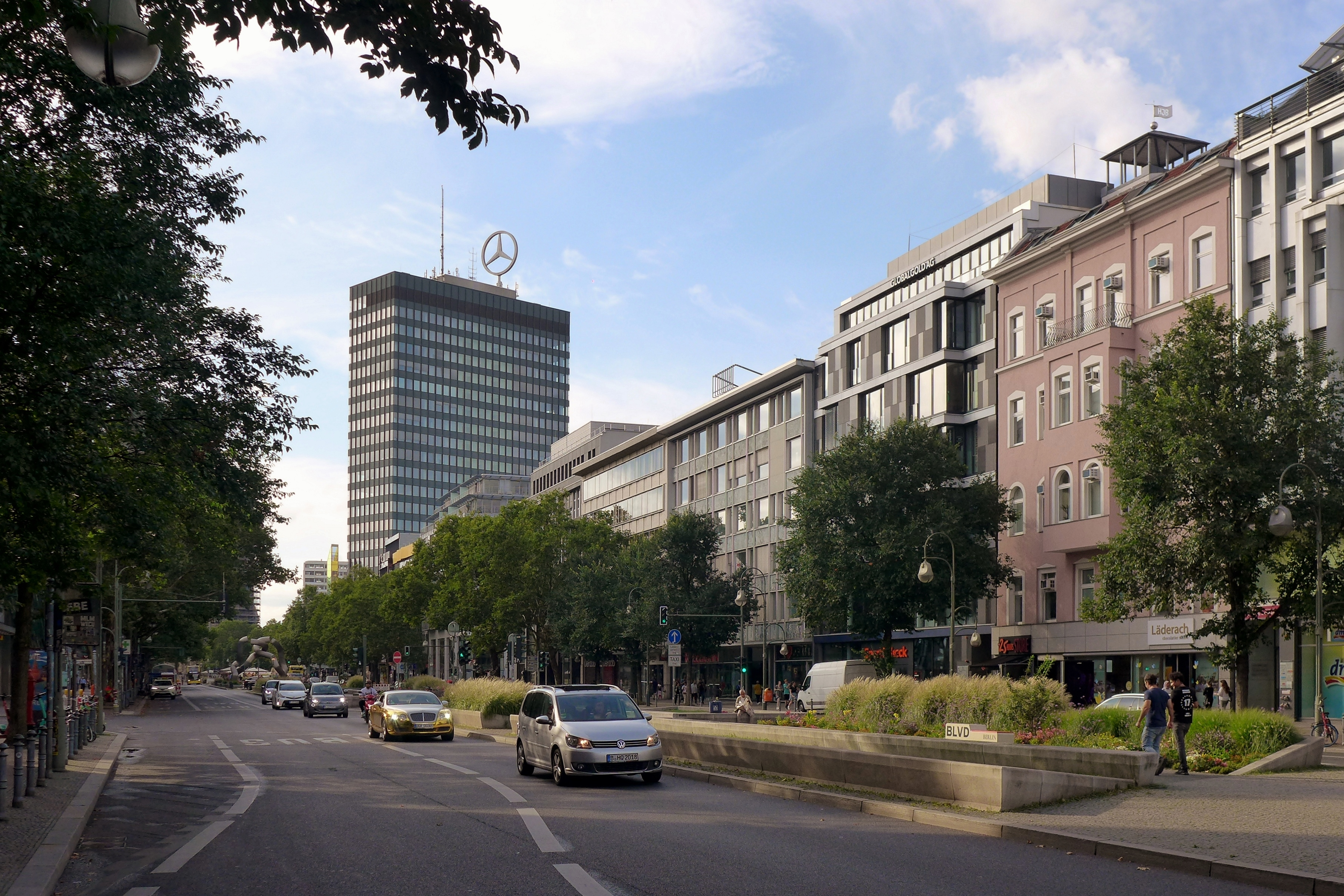
- Tauentzienstraße in 2024
- Interactive map of Tauentzienstraße
- Namesake: Bogislav Friedrich Emanuel von Tauentzien
- Type: Shopping street
- Length: 500 m (1,600 ft)
- Location: Berlin, Germany
- Quarter: Charlottenburg, Schöneberg
- Nearest metro station: Kurfürstendamm; Wittenbergplatz
- Coordinates: 52°30′11″N 13°20′22″E
- West end: Kurfürstendamm; Breitscheidplatz
- Major junctions: Rankestraße; Marburger Straße; Nürnberger Straße; Passauer Straße; Ansbacher Straße
- East end: Wittenbergplatz; Kleiststraße

Construction
- Inauguration: c. 1890

Tauentzienstraße, or Tauentzienstrasse (see ß; colloquially: der Tauentzien; transl. Tauentzien Street), is a major shopping street in the City West area of Berlin, Germany. With a length of about 500 m (1,600 ft), it runs between two important squares, Wittenbergplatz in the east and Breitscheidplatz in the west, where it is continued by the Kurfürstendamm boulevard. While the eastern half belongs to the Schöneberg district, the western part (beyond Nürnberger Straße) is in Charlottenburg.

== History ==
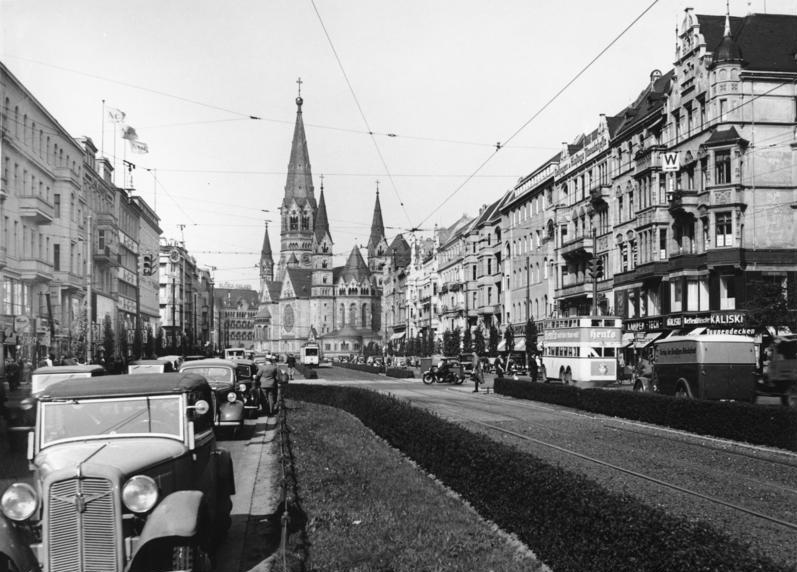
Tauentzienstraße, 1938

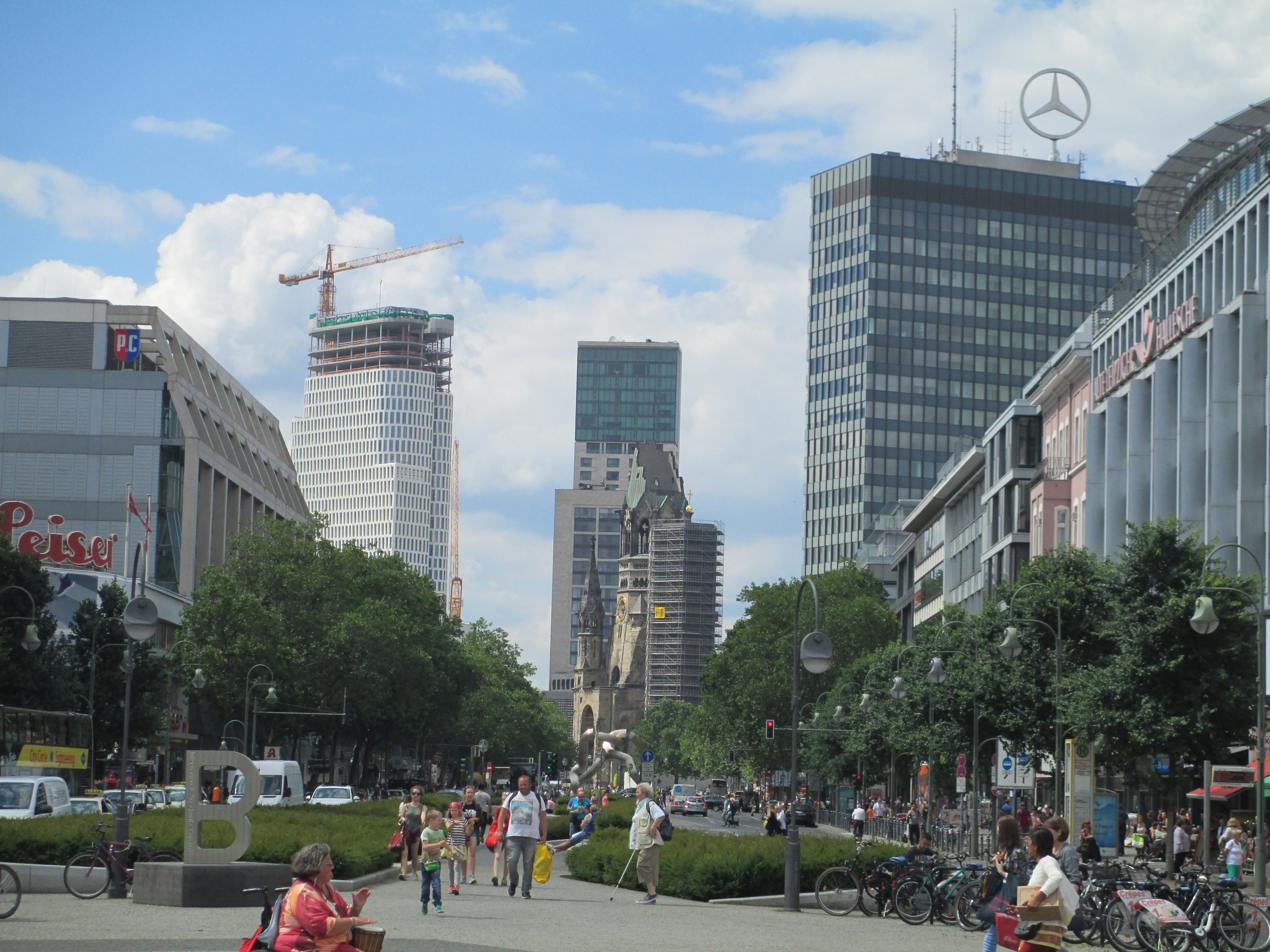
Corresponding view down Tauentzienstraße from Wittenbergplatz toward Breitscheidplatz and Kaiser Wilhelm Memorial Church, 2016

The broad street was laid out in the manner of a Parisian boulevard according to the Hobrecht-Plan of 1862. It was then part of a larger road link from Charlottenburg through Schöneberg to the Berlin district of Kreuzberg named after victorious Prussian generals (therefore colloquially called Generalszug in German). The projected section was named after Bogislav Friedrich Emanuel von Tauentzien (1760–1824) by order of King William I of Prussia in 1864, celebrating the 50th anniversary storming of French-occupied Wittenberg by the Prussian Army in the aftermath of the German Campaign of 1813. Tauentzien had been in command and, although he did not personally take part in the battle, he had been vested with the title von Wittenberg on the grounds of merit.

During the Wilhelmine era, in 1902, the first Berlin U-Bahn line (Stammstrecke) was inaugurated, which ran under the Tauentzienstraße pavement (the present-day U2). Furthermore, a tramway line ran on the central strip. The street became a popular neighbourhood for middle-class families: notable residents included the author Hermann Sudermann, the later Nobel laureate Gustav Stresemann, the painter Emil Nolde, and young Marlene Dietrich. The Romanisches Café, opened in 1916 at the western corner, quickly became a venue of artists and intellectuals of Berlin's Roaring Twenties. Many Jewish residents were deported and murdered during The Holocaust. The development was badly damaged by the Bombing of Berlin in World War II.

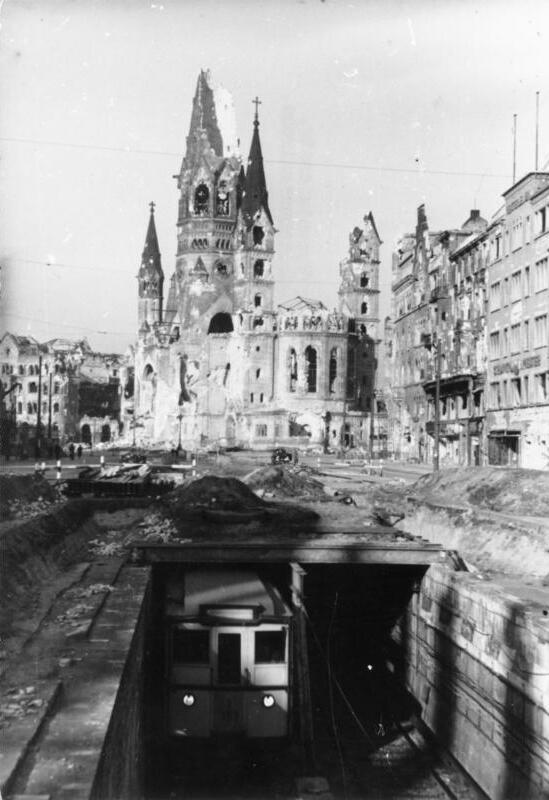
1945 condition

During the Cold War era, the street became part of the commercial center of West Berlin, along with the nearby Kurfürstendamm. Tauentzienstraße is actually the busier of the two streets due to the concentration of shops along its length.

In 2022, one person was killed and many others injured when a car crashed into pedestrians.

== Stolpersteine ==
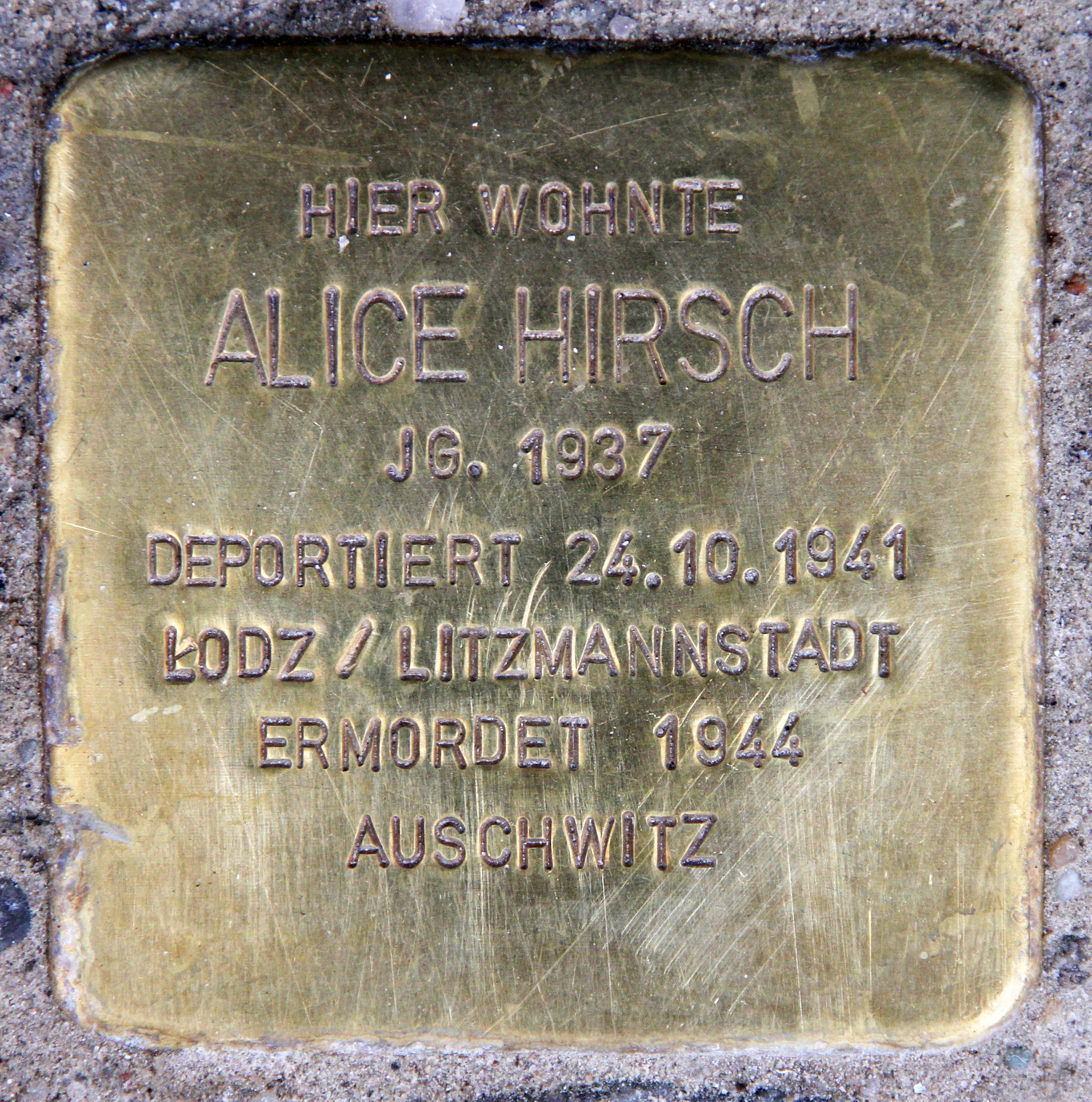
Stolperstein at Tauentzienstraße 7, commemorating the Hirsch family and Edith Seelig

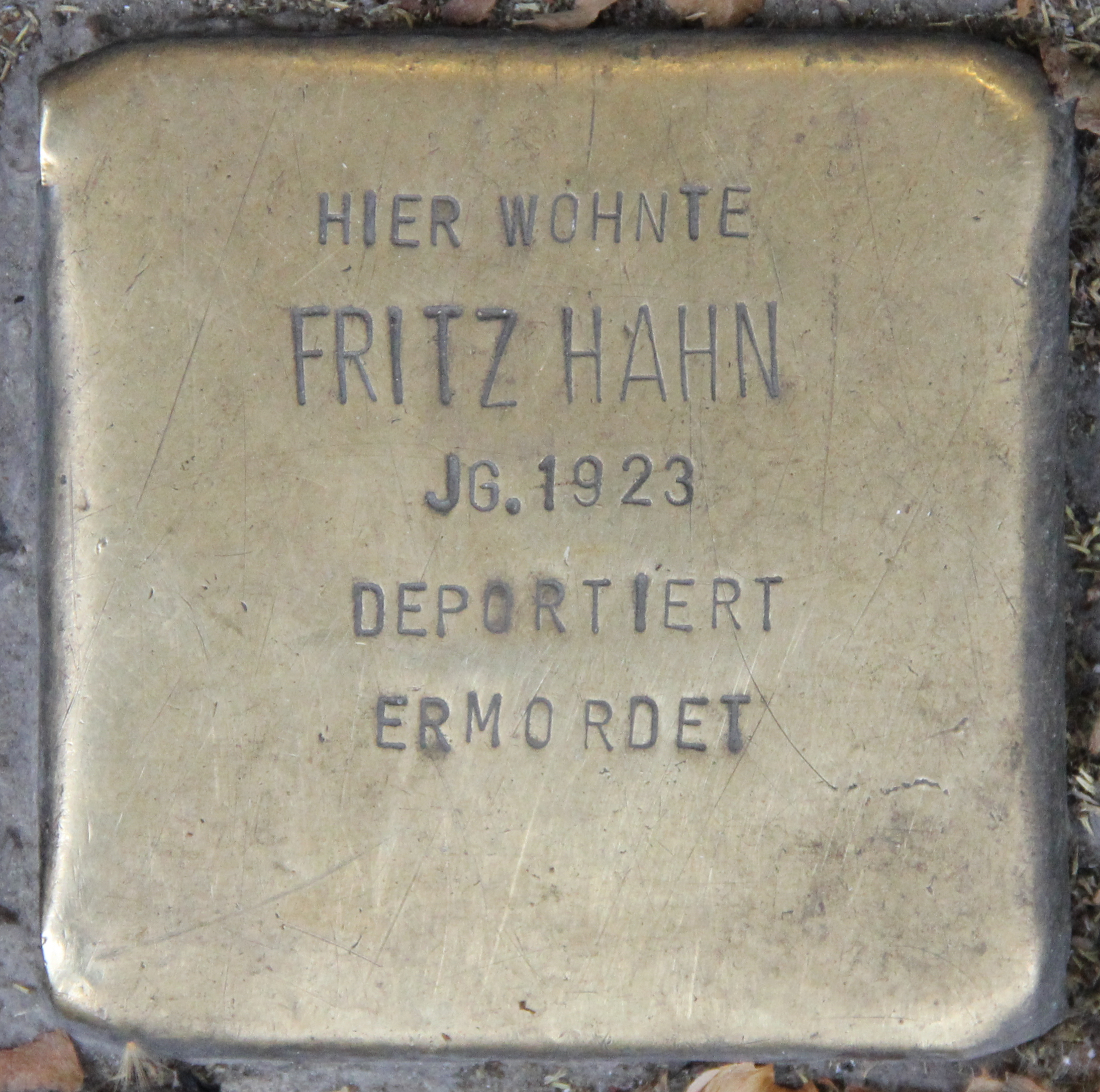
Stolperstein at Tauentzienstraße 13a, commemorating the Hahn family

== Attractions ==
Today, Tauentzienstraße is one of the busiest shopping streets in Berlin with top rents for prime retail business locations, strongly dominated by flagship stores of international fashion brands. Stores along its length include the famous Kaufhaus des Westens (KaDeWe) opened in 1907, the largest department store in continental Europe, the Europa Center mall with a branch of Saturn electronics, and a Peek & Cloppenburg clothing store.

Midway along the street is a sculpture, entitled Berlin, that expresses the "broken" nature of the city during the Cold War.
