= Kobierzyn =

Kobierzyn may refer to the following places in Poland:

- Kobierzyn, part of the Dębniki district of Kraków
- Kobierzyn, Lesser Poland Voivodeship
- Kobierzyn, Pomeranian Voivodeship
