= Arthur Hobrecht =

German politician (1824–1912)

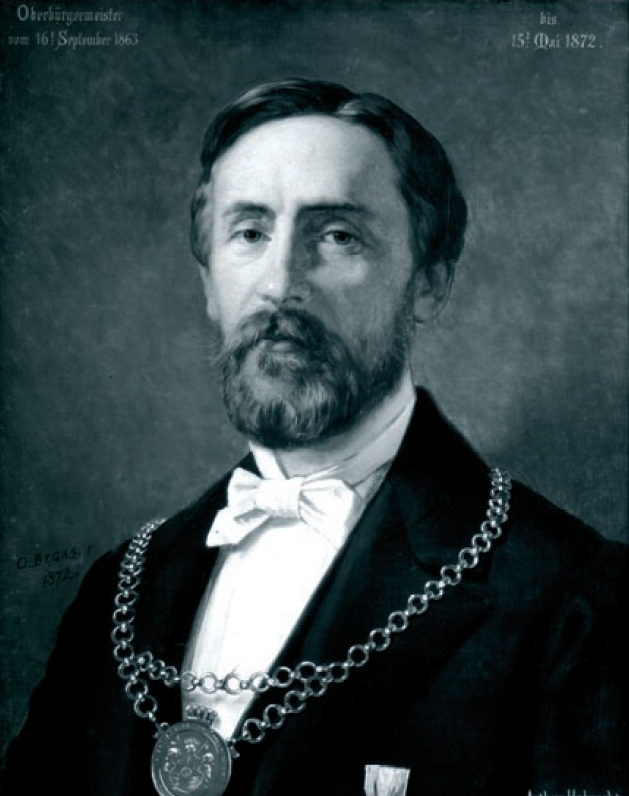
- Arthur Hobrecht

Mayor of Breslau
- In office 1863–1873

Mayor of Berlin
- In office 1873–1878

Prussian House of Lords
- In office January 1865 – March 1878

Prussian Minister of Finances
- In office March 1878 – 28 June 1879

Prussian House of Representatives
- In office 1880–1912
- Constituency: Preußisch Stargard (Starogard Gdański)

Member of the Reichstag
- In office 1881–1884
- Constituency: Marienwerder 1 (Stuhm/Marienwerder)
- In office 1886–1890
- Constituency: Marienwerder 3 (Graudenz)

Personal details
- Born: 14 August 1824 Kobierczyn, West Prussia, Kingdom of Prussia (Kobierzyn, Poland)
- Died: 7 July 1912 (aged 87) Lichterfelde (Berlin), Germany
- Party: National Liberal Party
- Spouse: Emma née Stampe (1828-1912)
- Children: Eva Doris (1858-1935); Fritz
- Relatives: James Hobrecht (brother)
- Occupation: jurist

Arthur Heinrich Rudolph Johnson Hobrecht (14 August 1824 – 7 July 1912) was a German liberal politician, mayor of Breslau (Wrocław) and Berlin. Hobrecht served as Prussian minister of Finances under Otto von Bismarck and was a member of the Prussian House of Representatives and the German Parliament.

== Biography ==
Hobrecht was born in Kobierczyn, West Prussia (Kobierzyn, Poland) to Ludolf Hobrecht. His mother, née Johnson, was of English descent.

Hobrecht studied law at the Universities of Königsberg (Kaliningrad), Leipzig and Halle. From 1841 to 1844 he worked at courts in Elbing (Elbląg), Graudenz (Grudziądz) and Marienwerder (Kwidzyn) in West Prussia and was deputy head of the district administration in Rybnik and Grottkau (Grodków) in Prussian Silesia from 1847 to 1849. Until 1860 he held several administrative positions in Posen (Poznan), Gleiwitz (Gliwice) and Marienwerder. In 1860 Hobrecht began to work at the Prussian Ministry of the Interior. In 1863 he became mayor of Breslau, as such also a member of the Prussian House of Lords.

Hobrecht succeeded Carl Theodor Seydel as mayor of Berlin in 1873. His younger brother James Hobrecht already served as head of Berlin's municipal planning administration and was responsible for the so-called Hobrecht-Plan, which coined the modern structure of the city of Berlin.

His attempts to incorporate the suburbs of Charlottenburg and Köpenick and the districts of Teltow in the south and Niederbarnim in the north into Berlin's administration were unsuccessful and led to his resignation in 1878. He then served as Prussian minister of finances from 1878 to 1879 but soon came into conflict with Chancellor Otto von Bismarck. After his dismissal he ran for the German National Liberal Party and was elected a member of the Prussian House of Representatives in 1880, a mandate he would hold until his death in 1912. Hobrecht also became a member of the German Reichstag, representing the Marienwerder 1 constituency from 1881 to 1884 and Marienwerder 3 from 1886 to 1890.

On his 80th birthday, 14 August 1904, Hobrecht became an Honorary citizen of Berlin. He died on 7 July 1912 in Lichterfelde (Berlin).
