= 2022 Berlin car attack =

Vehicle-ramming attack in Berlin, Germany

- Location: Berlin, Germany
- Date: 8 June 2022
- Deaths: 1
- Injuries: +30

On 8 June 2022, a person drove a car onto the sidewalk at the corner of Kurfürstendamm and Rankestraße across from the Kaiser Wilhelm Memorial Church in Charlottenburg, Berlin, Germany, killing one person and injuring 17 people. The suspect was arrested at the scene.

== Attack ==
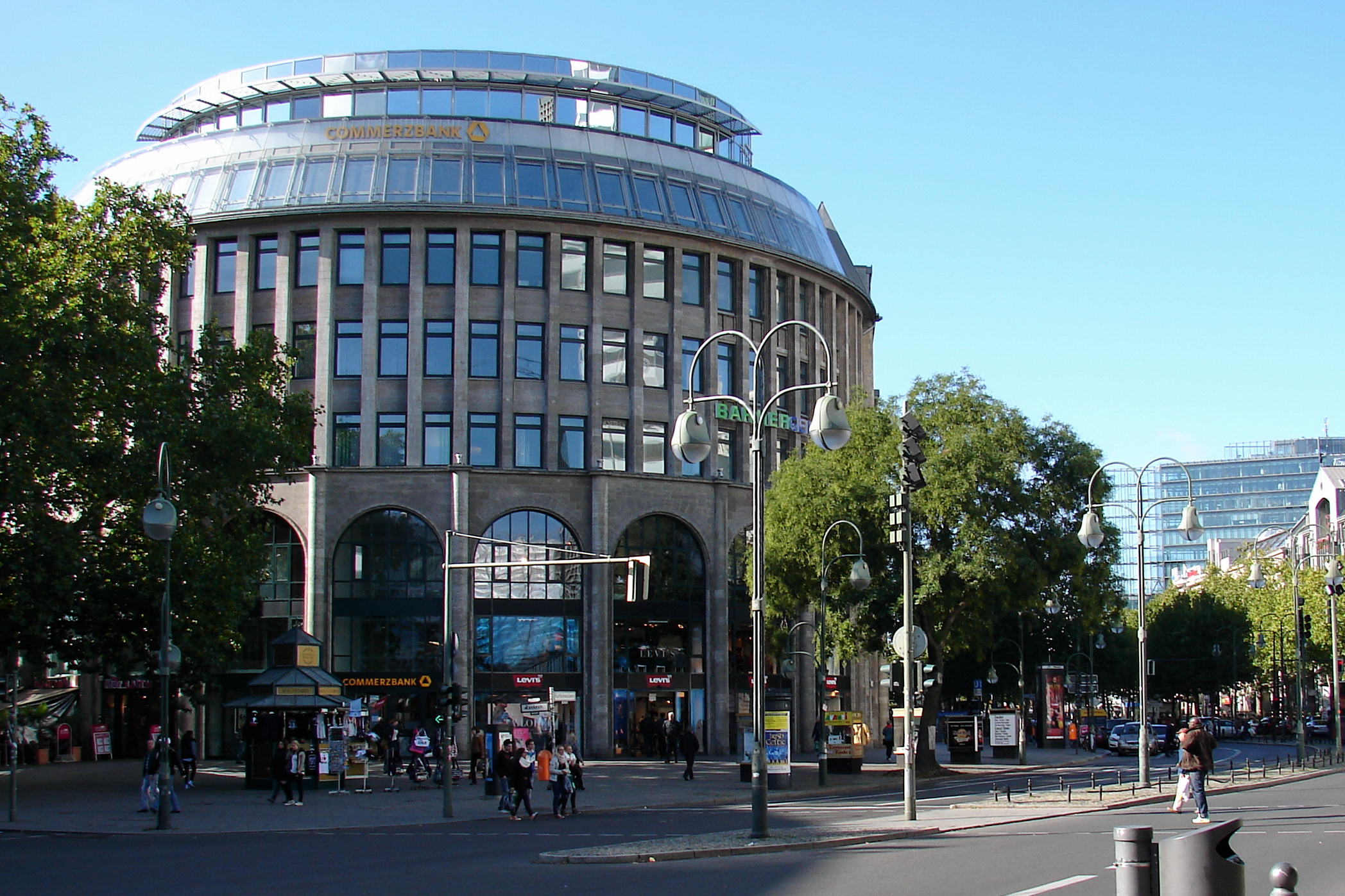
Corner house Kurfürstendamm, Rankestraße, where the perpetrator drove into pedestrians

At around 10:30 local time, a person in a Renault Clio drove onto the sidewalk at the end of the Kurfürstendamm on the corner of Rankestraße in Berlin running into a group of pedestrians. The driver then continued across the intersection onto Tauentzienstraße and finally crashed into the window of a Douglas cosmetics store one block further on the corner of Marburger Straße. The driver was detained by passersby before being arrested by the police.

Seventeen people were injured, including 14 school children. One person, a schoolteacher, died.

The suspect was identified as a 29-year-old man holding dual German and Armenian citizenship. Posters relating to Turkey were found in the car, which was initially reported as a note by Bild. According to Berlin's Interior Senator Iris Spranger (SPD), the man gained German citizenship in 2015. He was listed in police investigations into assault, trespassing, and insult. However, he was not known to be politically active or extremist, nor had he attracted attention for any anti-constitutional actions. No confession letter was found in the car. Spranger said on 9 June that, based on the current status, she would rate the event as a rampage by a mentally ill person.

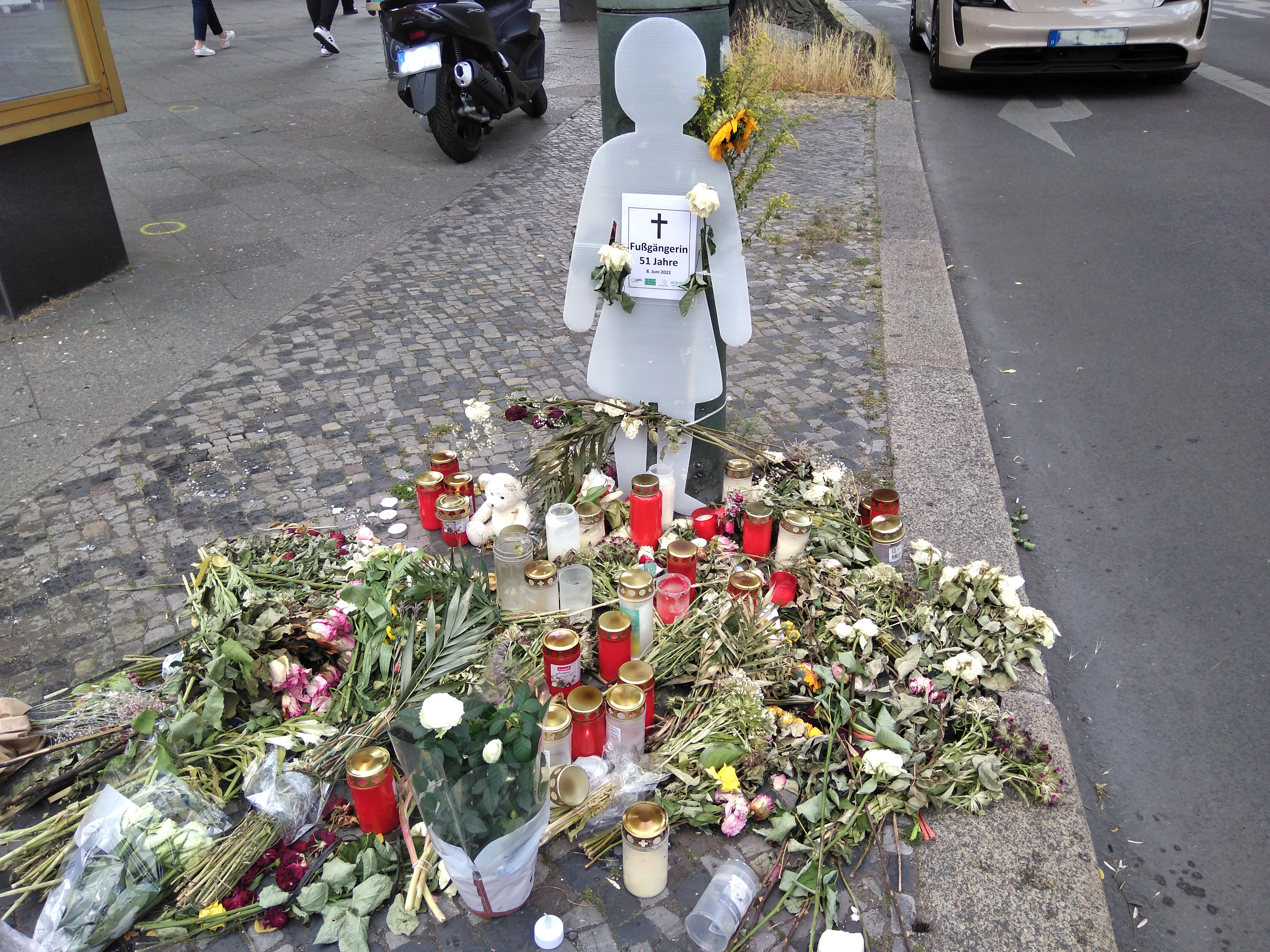
Memorial at the Kurfürstendamm corner

By 13 June, eight persons were still in hospital care. The police say over 30 persons had been injured. A 10th grade class from Bad Arolsen in Hesse was especially affected; one teacher was killed and one seriously injured as well. The driver was being held and guarded in a psychiatric institution due to his mental illness. Medication for his illness was found in his apartment. Public prosecution is charging him with one count of murder and 17 counts of attempted murder.

The incident happened just across from the Kaiser Wilhelm Memorial Church, which had been the site of a terrorist attack in December 2016.
