= Matschinsky-Denninghoff =

German artist couple

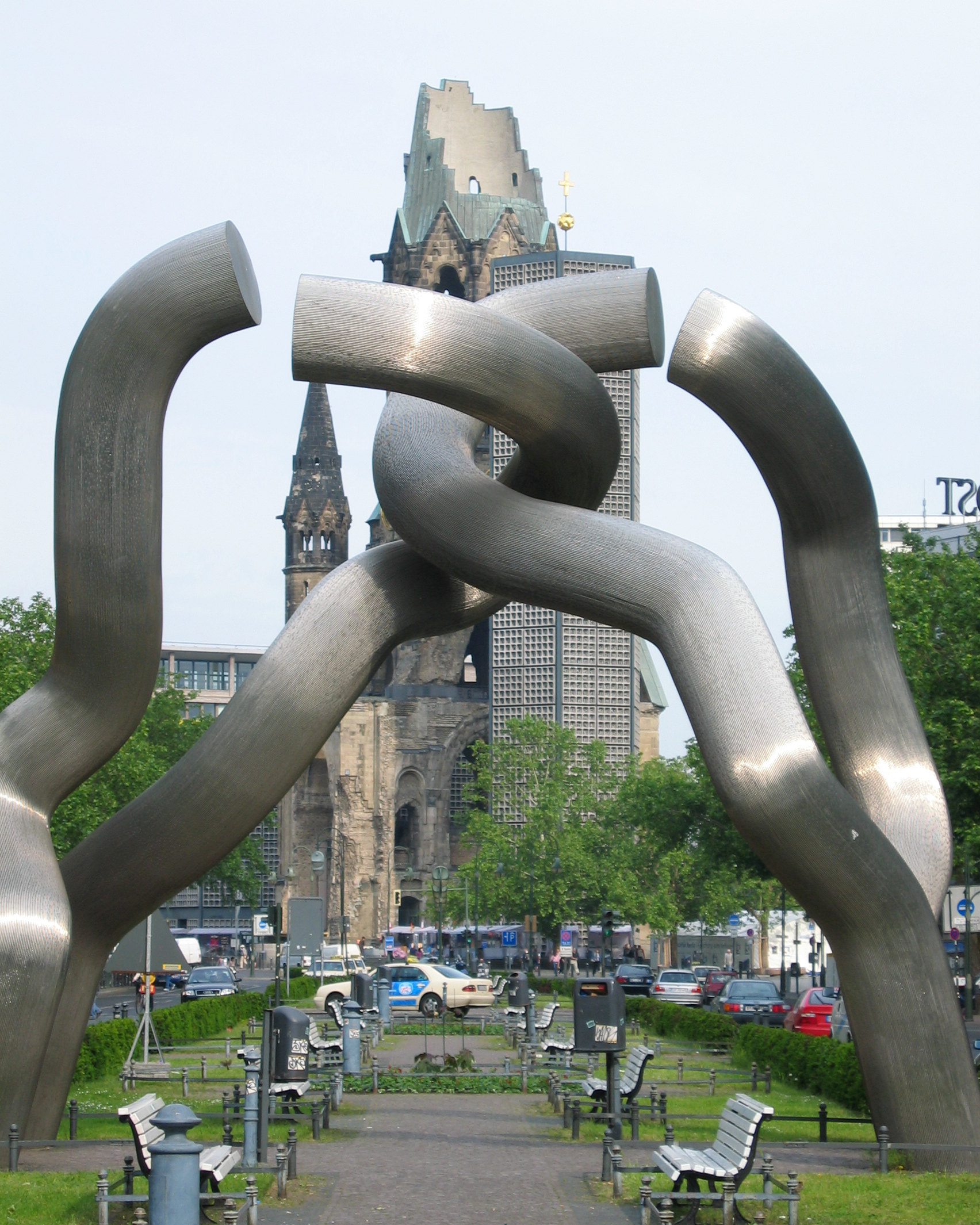
Berlin, 1987, steel reinforced with concrete.

Martin Matschinsky (b. 4 July 1921, Grötzingen, Karlsruhe, Baden — 24 January 2020, Berlin) and Brigitte Matschinsky-Denninghoff (born Meier-Denninghoff; 2 June 1921, Berlin — 11 April 2011, Berlin) were a German artist-couple known for their monumental abstract sculptures.
