= Lebensalter =

Fountain in Berlin, Germany

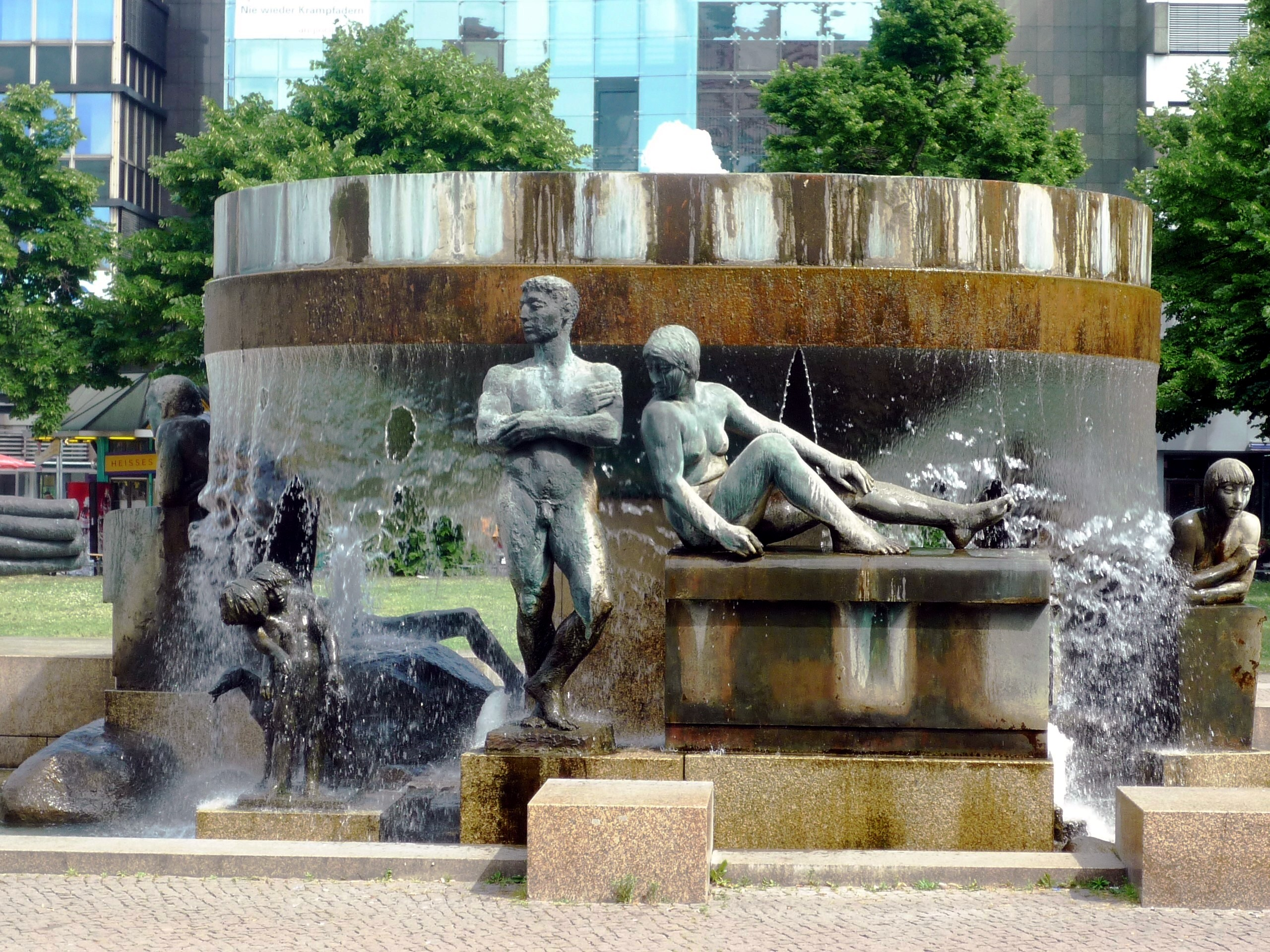
- The fountain in 2009
- Location: Berlin, Germany

Lebensalter is a fountain designed by Waldemar Grzimek, located at Wittenbergplatz in Berlin, Germany.
