= Berlin (sculpture) =

Sculpture in Berlin, Germany

Coordinates: 52°30′12.2″N 13°20′19.1″E

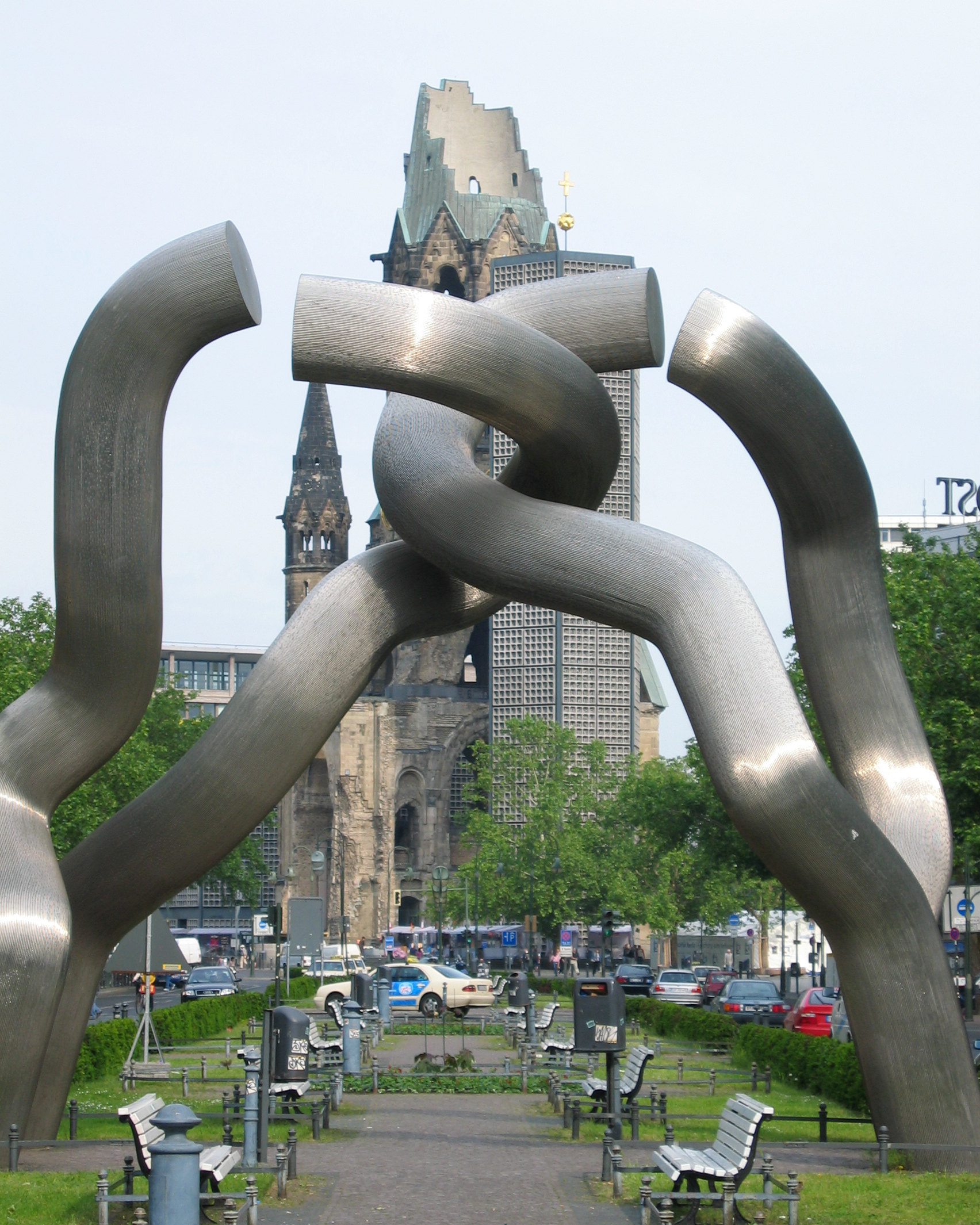
- Artist: Brigitte Matschinsky-Denninghoff; Martin Matschinsky
- Year: 1987
- Type: Steel reinforced with concrete
- Location: Tauentzienstraße, Berlin

Berlin is a sculpture on the Tauentzienstraße in Berlin, the capital of Germany. First conceived in 1985 and unveiled by the husband-and-wife sculpting team of Brigitte Matschinsky-Denninghoff and Martin Matschinsky in 1987, the sculpture's principal motif, a "broken chain", was meant to symbolize the severed connections between West and East Berlin due to the construction of the Berlin Wall. After the Wall was dismantled, the sculpture was bought by the city from Matschinsky-Denninghoff to commemorate this period in German history.

== History ==
Berlin was one of eight sculptures designed during "Skulpturenboulevard Kurfürstendamm" (Boulevard of Sculptures: Kurfürstendamm), an event commissioned by the city of West Berlin to celebrate Berlin's 750th anniversary in 1987. Of the eight sculptures unveiled, three were allowed to remain past the anniversary year (Berlin, Pyramide, and Cadillacs in Form der nackten Maja); the city and Deutsche Bank acquired Berlin after its original lease had expired.

For the event, the sculptors were allowed free rein to decide where on or around the Kurfürstendamm to erect their work. The Matschinsky-Denninghoffs chose the Tauentzienstraße in front of the Kaiser-Wilhelm-Gedächtniskirche, which was heavily damaged during the Bombing of Berlin in World War II, as the place to build and unveil their sculpture.

The sculpture consists of four steel tubes extending upwards. Each is about two meters in diameter, reinforced with a concrete base. For about half a meter, one of the two ends on each side tilt, then change direction completely, looping but not touching, symbolizing the closeness and isolation between the two sides of Berlin. The surface of the tubes are covered by chrome nickel steel, which can darken or shine depending on the time of day.

Describing the meaning and impact intended by the Berlin sculpture, Brigitte Matschinsky-Denninghoff said, "The sculpture is accessible from all sides and thus perceivable to viewers. [What is] emphasized is the direction West-East and East-West. Our sculpture is specifically designed as a big, 'organically grown' gate, forming a double arch which is not just necessary and practical, [but an] invigorating emphasis...we are trying to communicate something of Berlin's situation in a symbolic way."

== See also ==
- The Kaiser Wilhelm Memorial Church, located nearly
- "You have nothing to lose but your chains", a labor slogan
