= Hobrecht-Plan =

19th century land use plan for Berlin, Germany

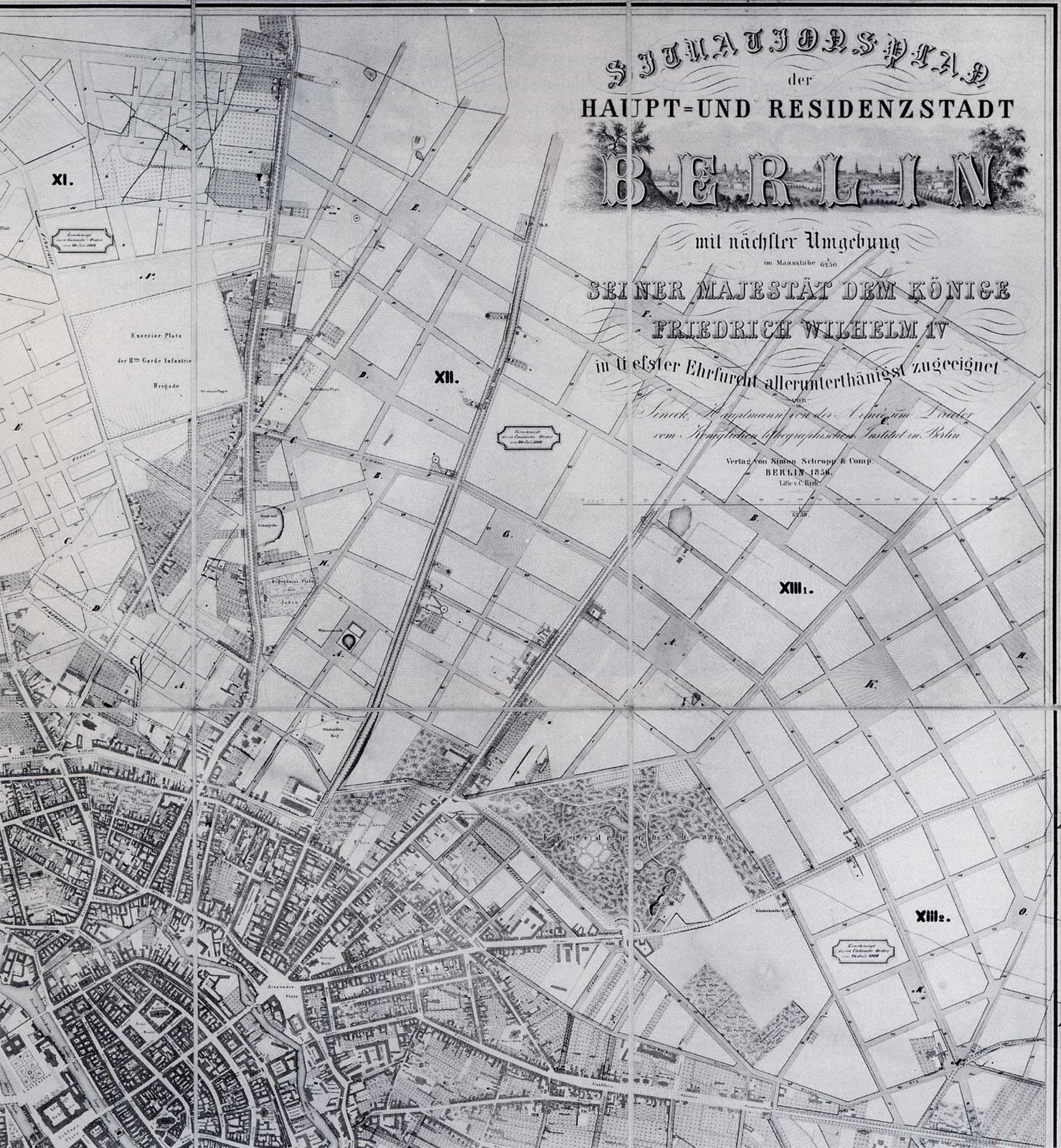
The land-use plan of 1858 for north-eastern directions – before Prenzlauer Berg and Friedrichshain quarters were built

The Hobrecht-Plan is the binding land-use plan for Berlin in the 19th century. It is named after its main editor, James Hobrecht (1825–1902), who served for the royal Prussian urban planning police ("Baupolizei").

The finalized plan "Bebauungsplan der Umgebungen Berlins" (Binding Land-Use Plan for the Environs of Berlin) was resolved in 1862, intended for a time frame of about 50 years. The plan not only covered the area around the cities of Berlin and Charlottenburg but also described the spatial regional planning of a large perimeter. Thus, it also prepared the city and its neighbouring municipalities for the Greater Berlin Act of 1920, which greatly extended Berlin's size and population.

The plan resulted in large areas of dense urban city blocks known as 'blockrand structures', with mixed-use buildings reaching to the street and offering a common-used courtyard, later often overbuilt with additional court structures to house more people. The Hobrecht-Plan inspired new urban plans after 1990 by construction senator Hans Stimmann and his colleagues, so that the formerly-divided Berlin would grow together and become denser and livelier.

Hobrecht's plan is often compared to Baron Haussmann's restructuring of Paris, as it also resulted in wide metropolitan avenues, large urban parks and squares, sewers and other modernisation projects of the infrastructure.

== History ==
The 1862 plan as a map (scale of 1:15'384)

The Industrial Revolution led to a swift rural exodus at the beginning of the 19th century. Berlin as the Prussian capital was the target of many emigrants resulting in a rapid growth. After the Napoleonic Wars the city grew by 10,000 new inhabitants every year accelerating in the middle of the century so that the metro area would reach the millions at the end of the century (see Berlin population statistics).

There had been already some urban planning on the city before Hobrecht. This includes proposals from Karl Friedrich Schinkel and planning maps from Johann Carl Ludwig Schmid dating to 1825 and 1830. Peter Joseph Lenné proposed a wider regional planning in 1840 named "Projektierte Schmuck- und Grenzzüge von Berlin mit nächster Umgebung" (projected decorative and boundary lines of Berlin and its immediate vicinity). All the persons were well-renowned architects and city planners.

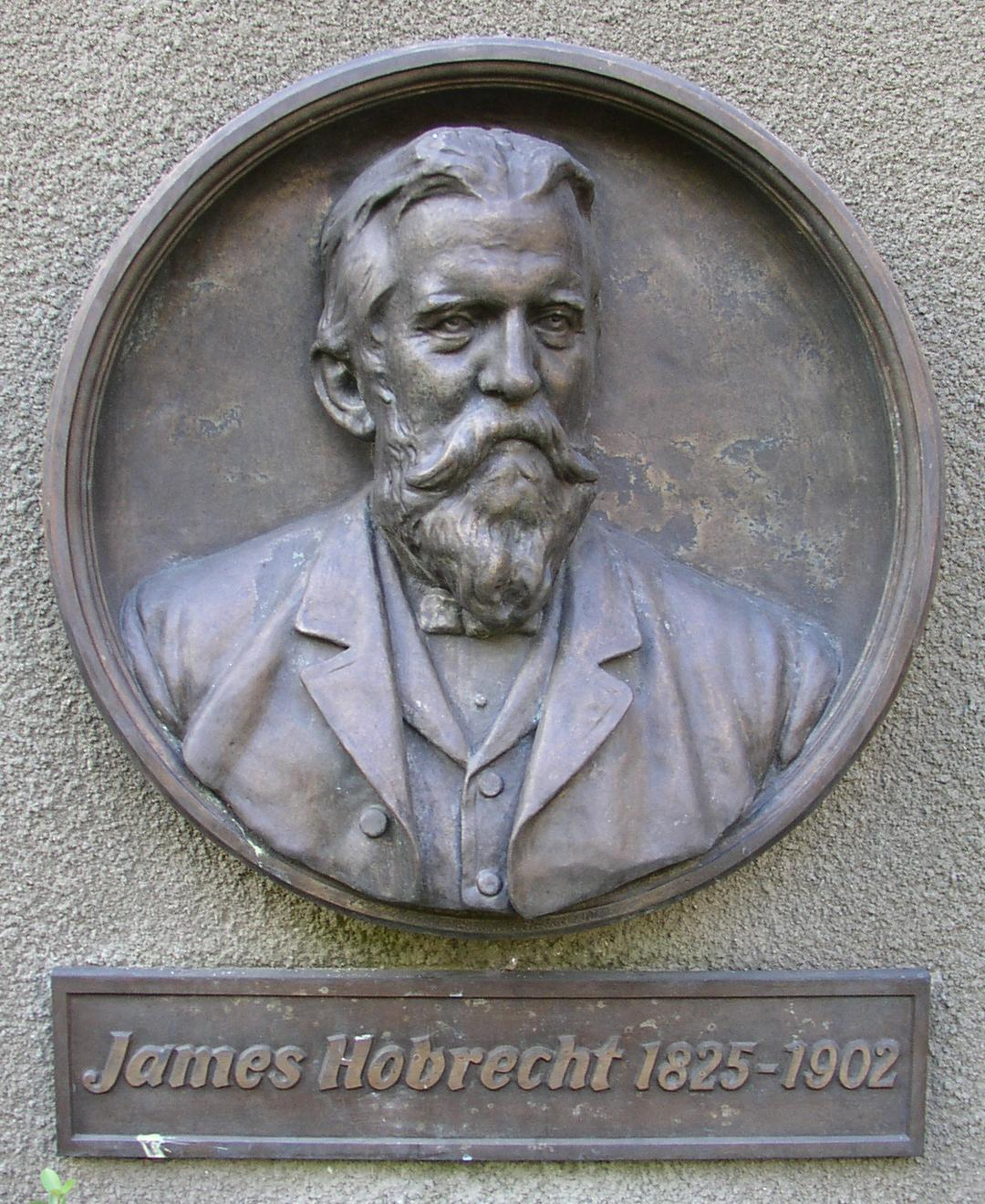
Memorial plaque for James Hobrecht in Hobrechtsfelde

Hobrecht was instead a geodesist (professional land surveyor) who had just extended his formation with a civil engineer examination on transportation planning ("Wasser-, Wege- und Eisenbahnbaumeisterprüfung") in 1858. Soon after entering the royal Prussian urban planning police he was commanded in 1859 to head the commission on creation of a land-use plan for Berlin and its environs. He traveled to Hamburg, Paris and London in 1860 to learn about the contemporary development status in urban planning especially their sewer systems.

In the 1860s the Berlin Customs Wall was removed and there were plans to amalgamate the many suburbs of Berlin on 1 January 1861. Based on the just finished land surveys and existing land-use proposals James Hobrecht constructed a map showing a possible land-use for a city at a projected size of 1.5 to 2 million inhabitants. It incorporated the land between the Customs Wall and a railway line being constructed to encircle the city; the area came to be known architecturally as the Wilhelmine Ring.

That Hobrecht-Plan did show two large ring roads encircling both of Berlin and Charlottenburg with dozens of arterial roads entering the city. The area between these were divided into rectangular spaces. Unlike the urban planning of Paris, Hobrecht did respect the existing roads, villages and railways including them into the planning process. The map was resolved on 18 July 1862 and it would influence the urban structure of Berlin for the centuries to come.

== Results ==
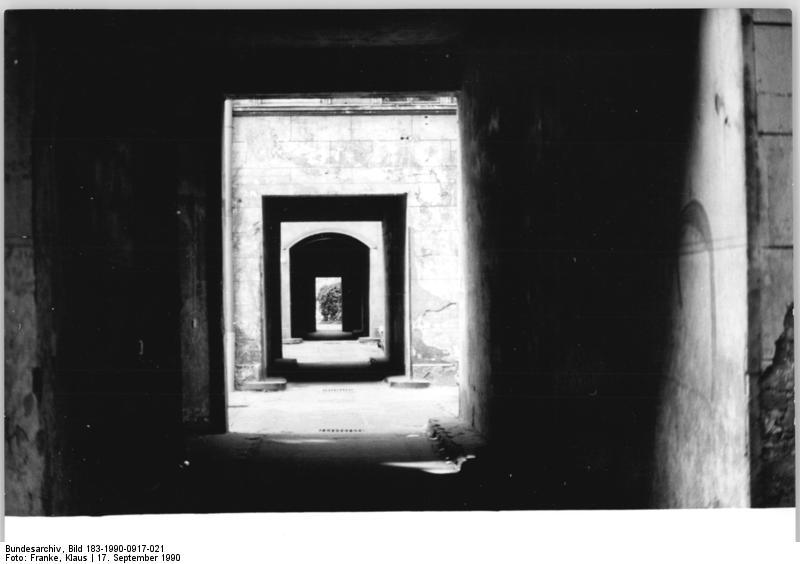
Mietskaserne – row of backyards showing the distance between each house is no more than required for the fire engine to turn

The Hobrecht-Plan was detailed for the street area, giving only the boundary lines for housing construction. The housing construction business was rather unregulated in comparison with modern construction rules – there were some basic constraints to allow fire brigades to do their work by having the maximum height limited to 20 meters and each house had to be reachable from the streets via a backyard of at least 5.34 × 5.34 meters in size to allow the fire engine to turn. In effect, speculative builders took over with densely packed architectural designs to allow a maximum number of rooms – the foundation of the Mietskaserne tenement housing estates rings.

While Hobrecht called for the front buildings to be designed for upper- and middle-class people, the backyard buildings were mostly plagued by lack of sunlight and poor ventilation. The situation worsened in Gründerzeit times with housing construction running too slowly so that the population density rose beyond 1000 inhabitants per square kilometer – many backyard houses had two to three inhabitants per room and the citywide sewer system was not to be finished before 1893.

== Reception ==
The Hobrecht-plan was criticized for decades as given the foundation for social problems, possibly even nurturing the street fights in the 1920s between red (communists) and brown (fascists) thugs in the crowded lower class quarters. Hobrecht himself was surely in the position and he had the education to outguess the results. He promoted his plan saying

In der Mietskaserne gehen die Kinder aus den Kellerwohnungen in die Freischule über denselben Hausflur wie diejenigen des Rats oder Kaufmanns, auf dem Wege nach dem Gymnasium. Schusters Wilhelm aus der Mansarde und die alte bettlägerige Frau Schulz im Hinterhaus, deren Tochter durch Nähen oder Putzarbeiten den notdürftigen Lebensunterhalt besorgt, werden in dem ersten Stock bekannte Persönlichkeiten. Hier ist ein Teller Suppe zur Stärkung bei Krankheit, da ein Kleidungsstück, dort die wirksame Hilfe zur Erlangung freien Unterrichts oder dergleichen und alles das, was sich als das Resultat der gemütlichen Beziehungen zwischen den gleichgearteten und wenn auch noch so verschiedenen situierten Bewohner herausstellt, eine Hilfe, welche ihren veredelnden Einfluss auf den Geber ausübt. Und zwischen diesen extremen Gesellschaftsklassen bewegen sich die Ärmeren aus dem II. oder IV. Stock, Gesellschaftsklassen von höchster Bedeutung für unser Kulturleben, der Beamte, der Künstler, der Gelehrte, der Lehrer usw., und wirken fördernd, anregend und somit für die Gesellschaft nützlich. Und wäre es fast nur durch ihr Dasein und stummes Beispiel auf diejenigen, die neben ihnen und mit ihnen untermischt wohnen.

— Hobrecht

(roughly) In the Mietskaserne housing estates they are next-door neighbours – the children from the basement flat goes along the same hallways to the free school just as the children from the upper class go to the grammar school. Shoemaker Wilhelm in the attic and the bedridden old Mistress Schulz in the backyard tenement with her daughter running a meager seamstress business they will be the best-known persons on the first floor. It allows to pass on a dish of the day, to help in times of sickness, to give away a warm jacket, and bring in incentives for additional schooling. From all that which will come out as comfortable relations between so differently socialized people it allows the giver to ennoble himself on the situation. In between the extremes of the social classes the poor from the second to fourth story will be nurtured by the cultural life of the civil servants, artists, professors and teachers. This will come out as beneficial to the society even when it would only be that the latter would have a daily silent example in their sight of those which were mixed among them.

This also indicates that he had no real intention to prevent the housing conditions of the lower class which he might have seen as normal in his times. The reception in the late 20th century is much more favorable to the Hobrecht-Plan as it did also establish the basis to resolve the problems that were to come. There are no records whether he did fight behind closed doors – but he was called off on 15 December 1861 already. He went to Stettin to build a water supply system and to plan the sewer system which would be built in 1870. With the help of his brother Arthur Hobrecht – who would eventually become lord mayor of Berlin in 1872 – he was able to return to Berlin in 1869 ordered to plan the sewer system for the city. The construction works would start in 1873 lasting until 1893. From 1885 to 1897 he was council member commissioned for urban planning.

== See also ==
- Berliner Stadtring – unfinished motorway mostly running along the outer ring of the Hobrecht Plan.
- Inner Ring Road, Berlin – road construction taking advantage of one of the inner Hobrecht Plan ring roads.
- Wilhelmine Ring (Berlin) – features of the 19th century block housing that emerged in the streets laid out in the Hobrecht Plan
