= Kobierzyn, Pomeranian Voivodeship =

Village in Kociewie

Kobierzyn
- Settlement
- Location within Poland
- Coordinates: 54°7′1″N 18°35′5″E
- Country: Poland
- Voivodeship: Pomeranian
- County: Gdańsk
- Gmina: Trąbki Wielkie

Kobierzyn [kɔˈbjɛʐɨn] is a settlement in the administrative district of Gmina Trąbki Wielkie, within Gdańsk County, Pomeranian Voivodeship, in northern Poland.

For details of the history of the region, see History of Pomerania.

== Notable residents ==
- Arthur Hobrecht (1824–1912), German politician
