= Johann Carl Ludwig Schmid =

German architect

Johann Carl Ludwig Schmid (12 September 1780 in Cottbus – 4 September 1849 in Berlin) was a German architect. He succeeded August Günther as leader of the Oberbaudeputation in 1842, and in 1848 the kingdom of Prussia made him director of Berlin's Bauakademie.
