= Wilhelmine Ring (Berlin) =

Belt of housing blocks in Berlin, Germany

The Wilhelmine Ring is the name for a belt of distinctive multi-occupancy rental housing blocks constructed in the second half of the 19th century around the historic city center of Berlin. It is characterized by a dense settlement pattern with four- to five-story residential buildings with side and rear wings around an inner courtyard. The designation reflects the period of origin of this town planning solution under the German monarchs Wilhelm I and Wilhelm II.

== Location ==
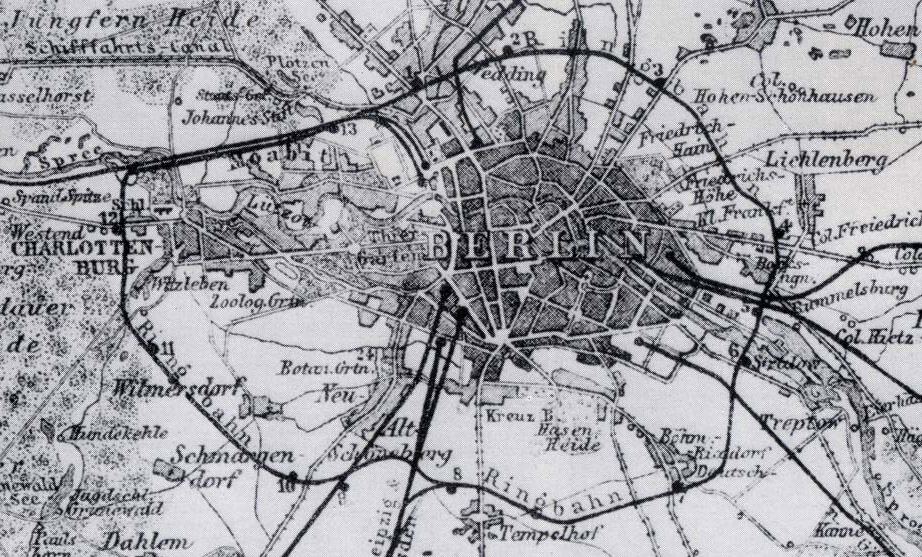
The railway line around Berlin on an 1885 map. The dark area at center right is the developed part of the city, which was long constricted by the customs wall

The Wilhelmine Ring comprises large parts of the Berlin subdistricts Wedding, Gesundbrunnen, Prenzlauer Berg, Friedrichshain, Kreuzberg, Neukölln, Schöneberg, Tiergarten, Moabit and Charlottenburg. It arose primarily in the still undeveloped area between the Berlin Customs Wall, which was removed in the 1860s, and a railway line constructed between 1867 and 1877 to encircle the city.

== Preconditions and features ==
The commencement of large-scale German industrialization in the latter part of the 19th century led to a pressing need for labor, which was met by a strong rural exodus favoring Berlin, where abundant jobs could be found. Living accommodations for this rapid influx of workers were needed in the immediate vicinity of the new factories, for which there was no space within the old city limits.

In 1861 a large scale incorporation of neighboring settlements had expanded the area of Berlin by some 70 percent. According to census figures, 547,571 people lived in the city in that year. This population almost tripled in the course of the ensuing 30 years, without significant area growth of the city. The planning for the necessary housing was undertaken in 1862 by James Hobrecht, whose “Plan for developing the surroundings of Berlin”, as its name indicates, included an area far exceeding the limits of the just-enlarged city. It specified a network of ring and radial streets with relatively large block sizes, which facilitated the rapid construction of large adjoining buildings in which multi-family rental accommodations were planned.

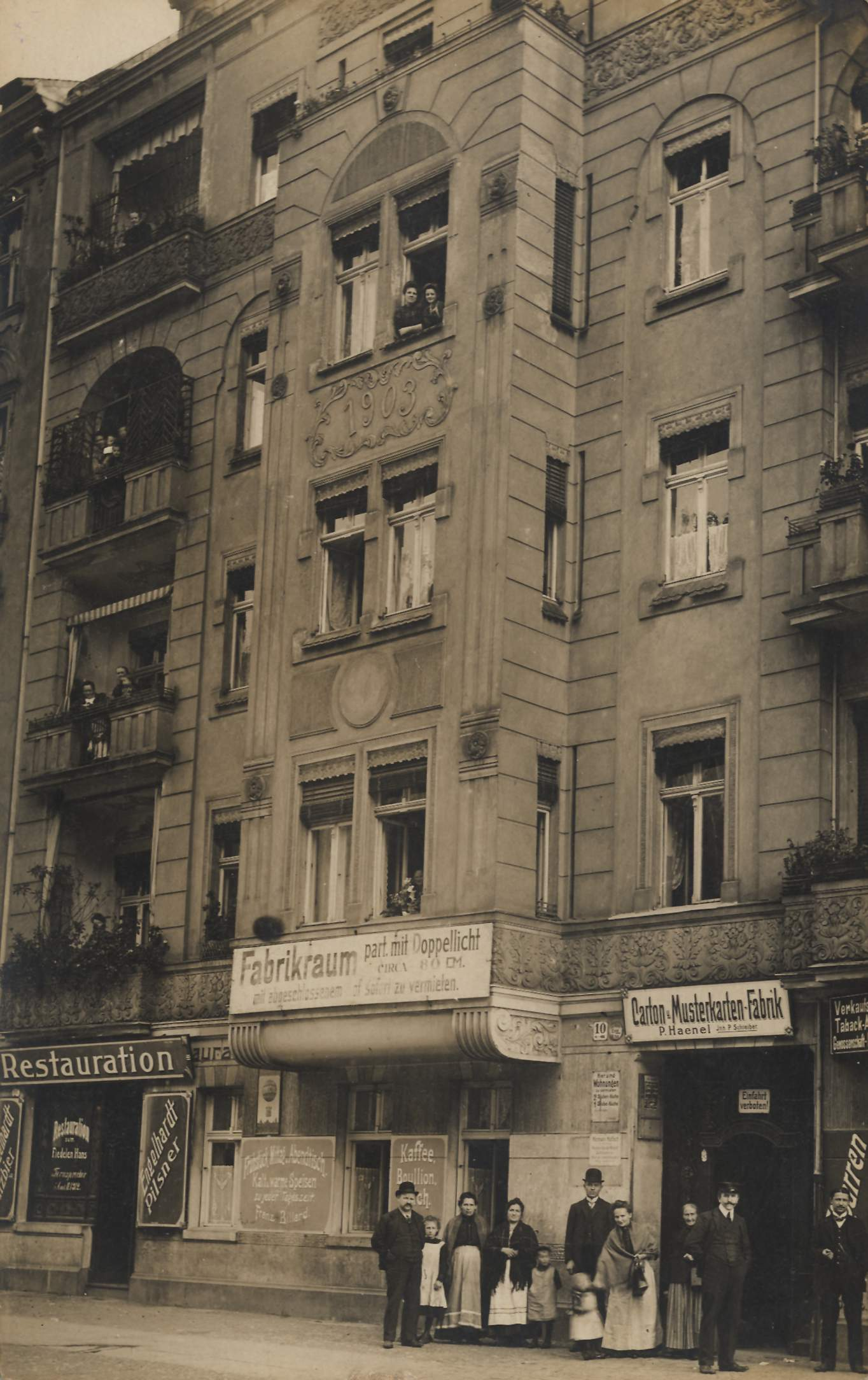
Typical Wilhelmine Ring building with shops on the ground floor and apartments in the upper storeys, from a postcard featuring Wedding around 1900

A decisive factor was a regulation passed in 1853 by city planning authorities obligating property developers to little more than adhering to a specified street frontage and a minimal size for the inside courtyards of 5.34 × 5.34 meters, at that time the turning circle of city wagons with fire-fighting equipment. Therefore, in the following decades private developers building in the area to be known as the Wilhelmine Ring used each land parcel to the maximum possible extent, filling it with five- to six-story buildings containing many, often very small, rental units. Since the developers had to co-finance the street-access infrastructure, with costs calculated on the basis of the width of the street frontage, this part of the building was relatively narrow, the rest being taken up by the side and rear wings. The front apartments were frequently large and spacious and intended for the middle class, containing, particularly in the desirable first upper floor (the bel étage or piano nobile), decorative stucco ceilings and parquetry flooring and commanding high rents. The rear wing apartments, by contrast, were much smaller and plainer, harder to ventilate, without views, and usually only offering shared toilet facilities in the hallways or courtyard. These back apartments were primarily rented by working-class families, who in turn sublet rooms to supplement their modest income. In the Wilhelmine Ring the population density was over 1000 per hectare. Over 20 percent of the workers were so-called “sleepers-in” without the resources to rent even a single room, renting a bed on an hourly basis in an apartment that was, even without them, frequently very overcrowded.

Only in 1887 did a new regulation impose stricter constraints on property developers. For example, the eaves or lower edge of the roof could not be higher than 22 meters and the number of storeys was limited to five.

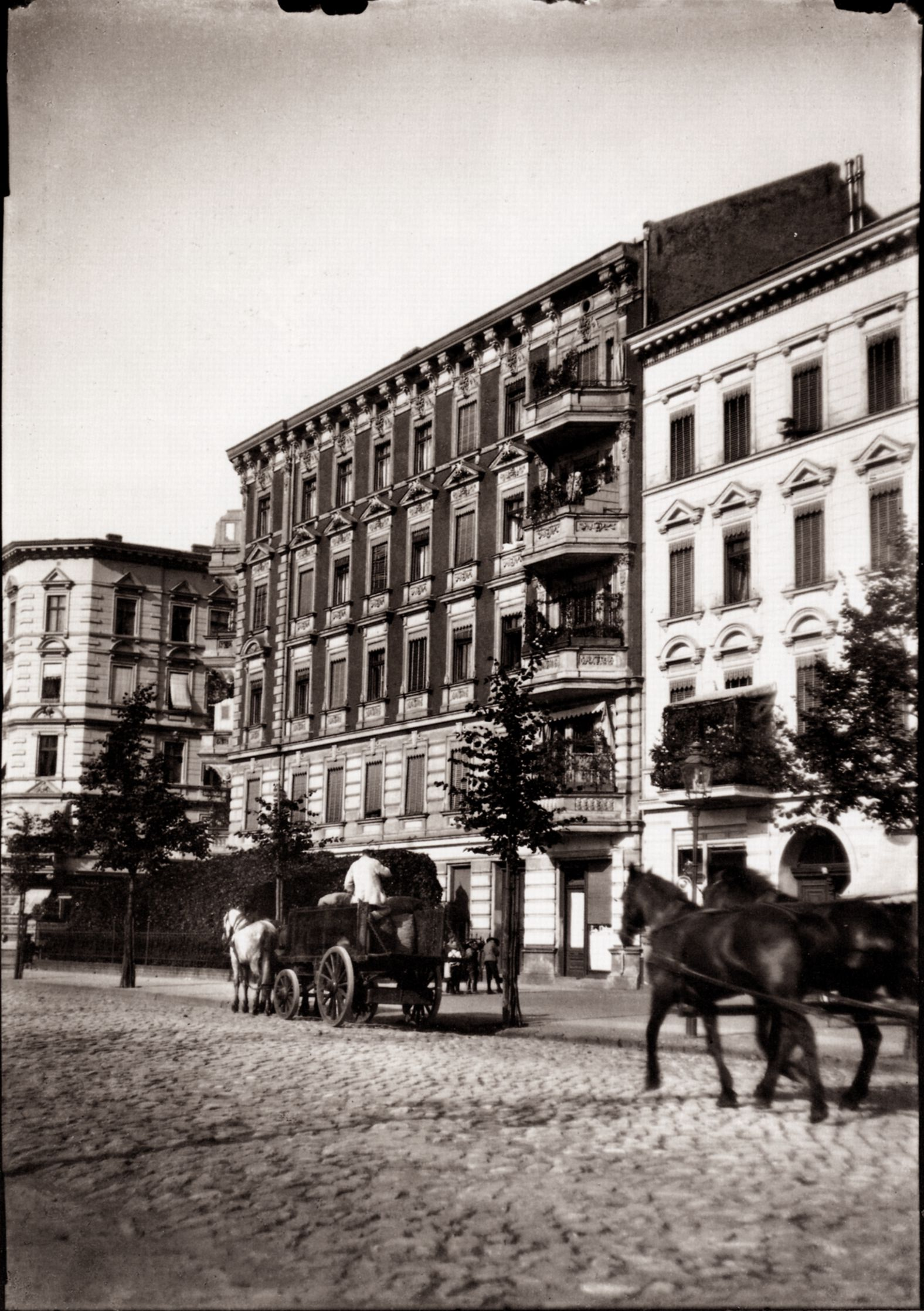
Sophie-Charlotten-Strasse 88, Berlin, 1892

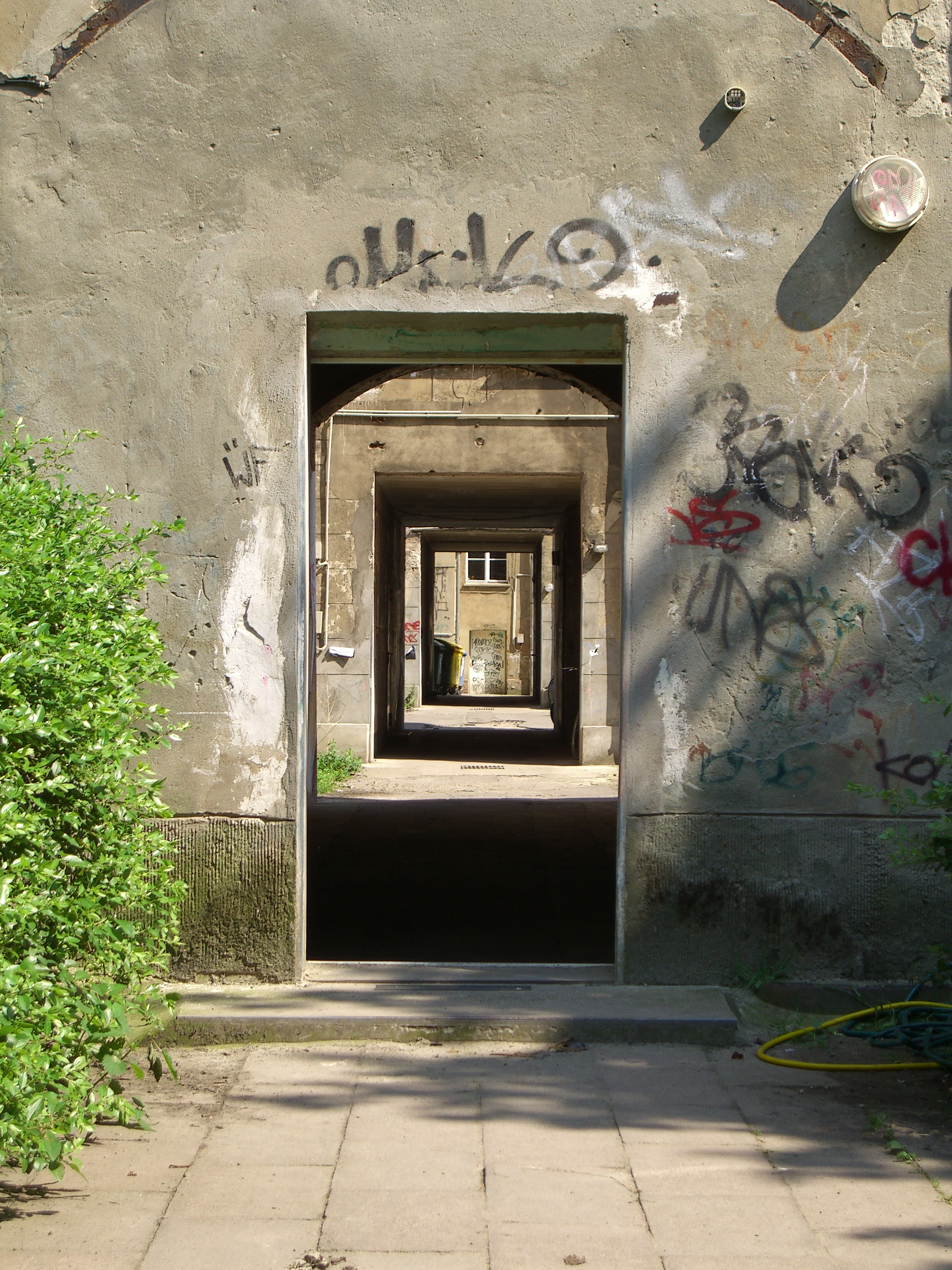
Sequence of back wings with interconnected inner courtyards in a building at Kastanienallee 12, Berlin

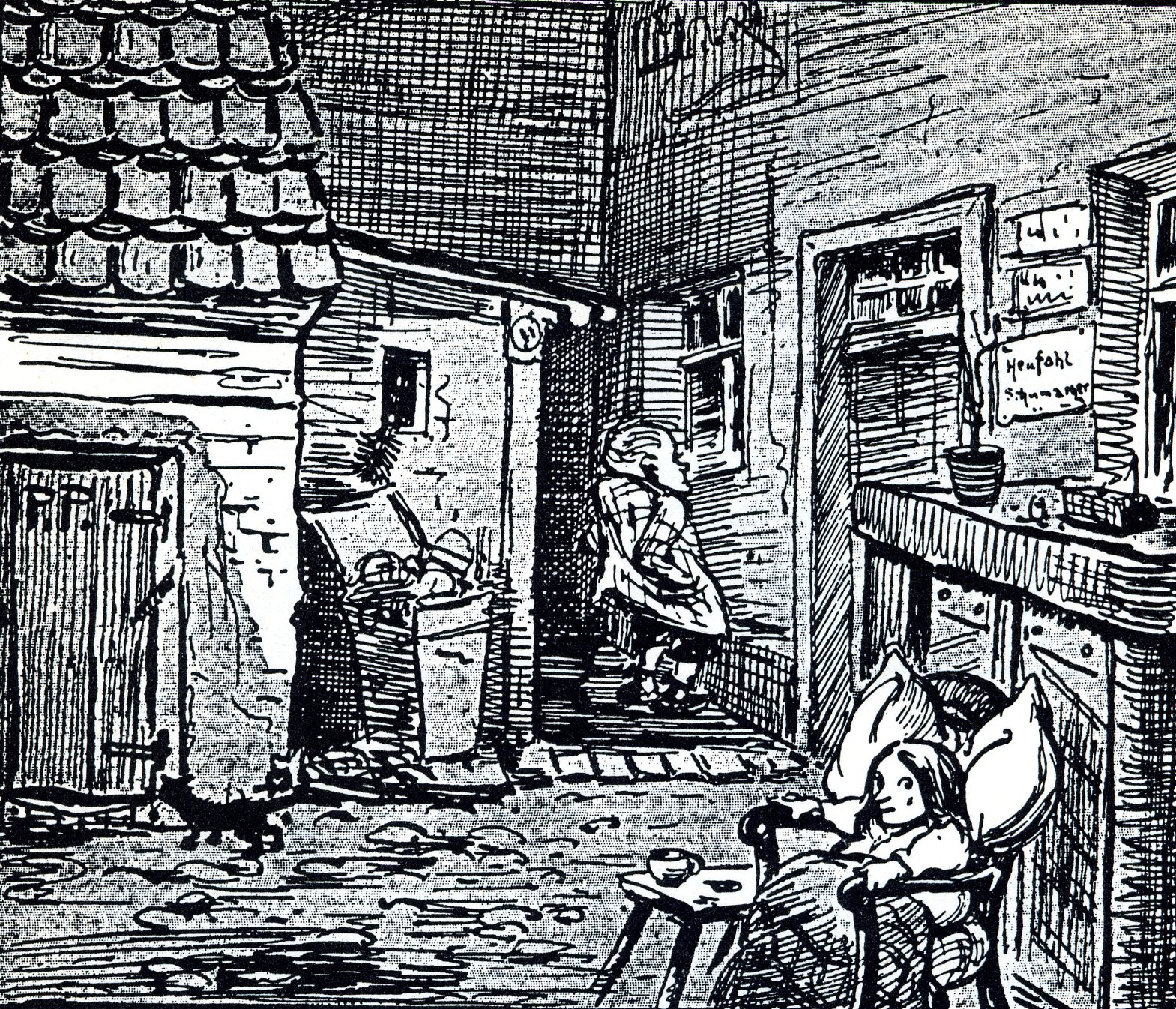
Critique of inner courtyards in a drawing by Heinrich Zille (1858-1929) "Hey ma, gimmie the flow'r pots, y'know how Lizzy loves t' sit where it's green!"

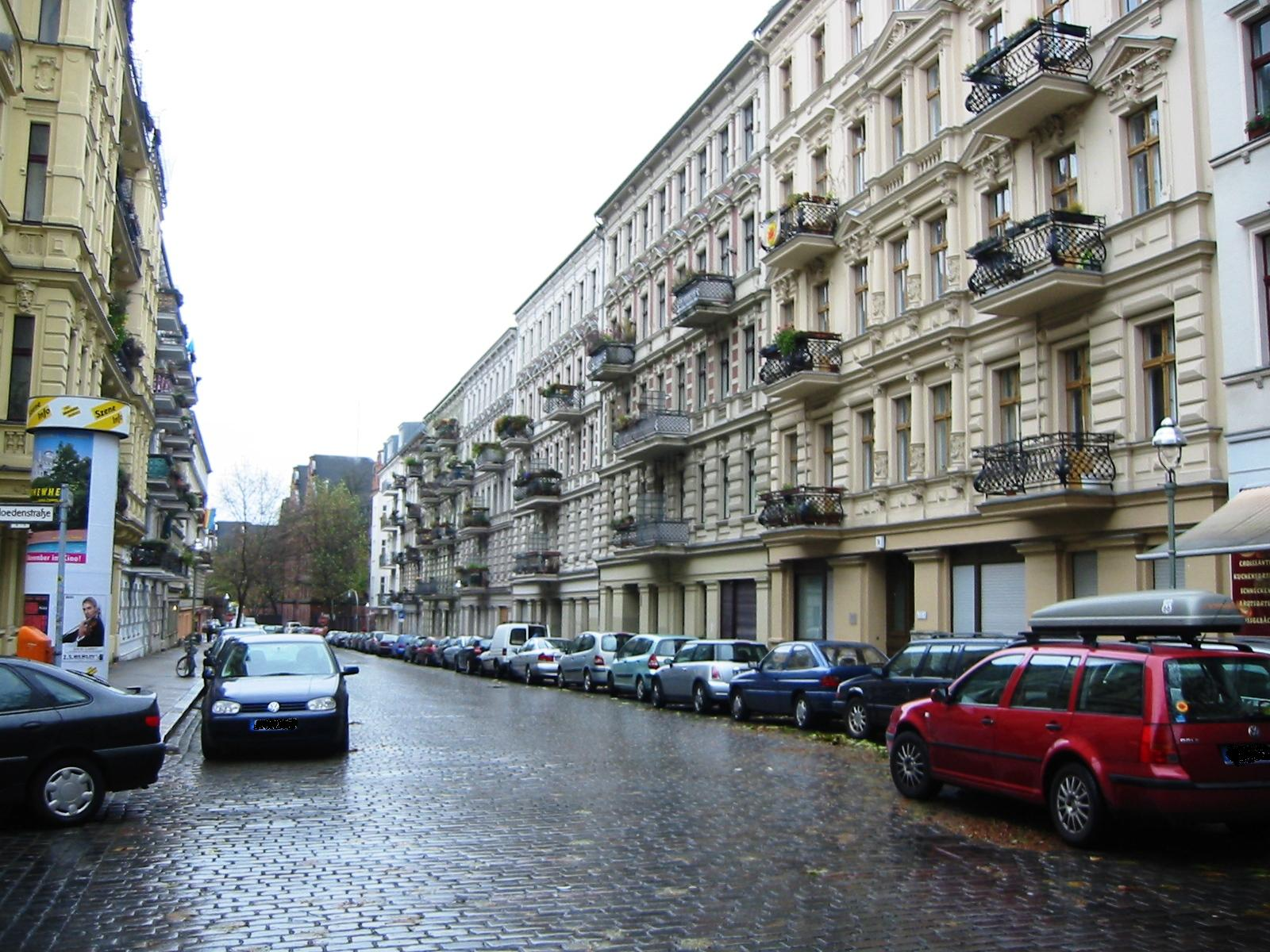
Typical Wilhelmine Ring residential building in Berlin-Kreuzberg, 2010

== Current situation ==
Wherever it was not badly destroyed in World War II the Wilhelmine Ring is still very present in today's Berlin and a distinctive feature of the city. Although the ring is still characterized by high density construction and a scarcity of open spaces, the flats are popular because of their historic character and nearness to the city center. In the course of urban redevelopment, renovation and modernization, inner courtyards were sometimes expanded by removing rear or side wings. In other cases the size of the rear apartments was considerably increased by combining them into larger units.
