= Teamtechnik =

Company

Teamtechnik Maschinen und Anlagen GmbH
- Company type: GmbH
- Founded: 1976
- Headquarters: Freiberg am Neckar, Germany
- Key people: Stefan Roßkopf, Falk Bäurle, Frank Hack, Frank Sickinger
- Revenue: €155 million (2020)
- Number of employees: 730 (2020)
- Parent: Dürr AG
- Website: www.teamtechnik.com

Teamtechnik Maschinen und Anlagen GmbH (stylized as teamtechnik) is a company active in the areas of production systems and functional testing of products for the automotive, medical and solar energy industries. Within the electromobility sector, Teamtechnik manufactures assembly and testing systems for batteries. The company is based in Freiberg am Neckar. In 2020, the company employed 730 people and generated revenues of €155 million.

== History ==
The company Teamtechnik was founded by Max Roßkopf in 1976 together with four partners.

In the 1990s, Teamtechnik specialized on developing standardized and modularized assembly systems. In 1997, the patented Teamos assembly platform was introduced. One year later, the founder's son Stefan Roßkopf joined the company as managing director. In 1999, the company developed its first modular testing systems for passenger car manual transmissions. The same year, Teamtechnik founded its first international subsidiary, Teamtechnik Corp. in Lawrenceville (Georgia), USA.

Further, the group initiated the development of medical assembly systems and in 2005 the company started developing stringers for connecting solar cells.

In 2010, Teamtechnik founded subsidiaries in China and started production in Jintan, China. One year later, Teamtechnik entered into a 90% shareholding in Pfuderer Maschinenbau GmbH, a manufacturer of cam-controlled automation systems. Pfuderer's name was changed to Teamtechnik Automation GmbH in 2016. Between 2005 and 2019 Teamtechnik operated in Poland with an own subsidiary, Teamtechnik Production Technology Sp. z o.o.

Since 2016, Teamtechnik has been manufacturing test benches for e-vehicles as well as assembly and testing equipment for batteries. During this time, the production capacities in Freiberg were expanded three times between 2013 and 2018. With the last expansion a new production hall opened, in which Teamtechnik has been producing test systems, especially for the Volkswagen Group.

In December 2020, the Dürr Group acquired a majority stake of 75% in Teamtechnik. In July 2021, Dürr acquired Hekuma GmbH, which was subsequently incorporated into the Teamtechnik group. Through the acquisition, Teamtechnik expanded its automation segment in the field of medical technology. Dürr increased its stake to 100% in November 2023.

Teamtechnik Automation GmbH was merged with Teamtechnik Maschinen und Anlagen GmbH on April 2, 2024, and is now a branch of this company.

== Corporate structure ==
The Dürr Group has held 100% of the shares since November 2023. Previously, the founding family still held 25% of the shares.

The company is based in Freiberg am Neckar, Germany. In addition to the main site in Freiberg, Teamtechnik operates others sites in neighboring Ludwigsburg and in Hallbergmoos (Hekuma GmbH). Further, Teamtechnik holds subsidiaries in China and in the USA. The Teamtechnik group is active in the automotive, medtech and solar sector.

Within Dürr, Teamtechnik, BBS, Kahle, and Hekuma form the Business Unit Production Automation Systems (PAS).

== Products ==
Teamtechnik manufactures assembly and testing stations in the following areas: automotive and e-mobility, medical equipment, electrical batteries, and solar power. The company holds various patents, most prominently for the Teamos modular plant platform.

Teamtechnik Automation GmbH develops fast-cycle, cam-controlled systems for automated production as well as for feeding technology. Hekuma is a supplier of automated systems for the production of disposable plastic products used in medication, diagnostics, and laboratory technology.

== Bibliography ==
- Konold, Peter; Reger, Herbert (2003). Praxis der Montagetechnik [Practice of assembly technology.] (in German). Wiesbaden: Vieweg-Verlag. ISBN 978-3-528-13843-1.
