= Heinz Dürr =

German businessman (1933–2023)

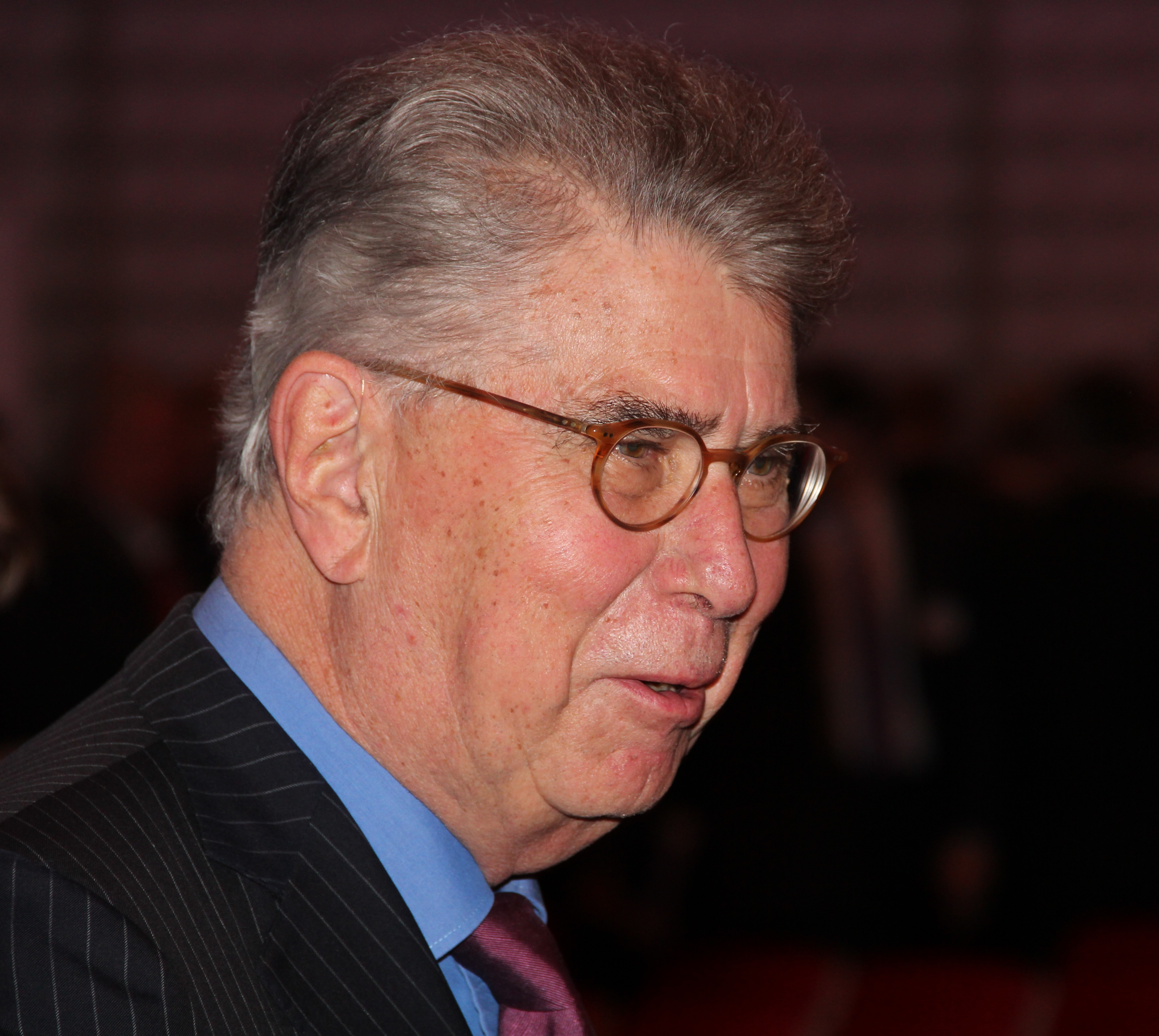
- Dürr in 2013
- Born: 16 July 1933; Stuttgart, Germany
- Died: 27 November 2023 (aged 90); Berlin, Germany
- Occupation: Business executive
- Organizations: Dürr AG; AEG; Deutsche Bahn

Heinz Dürr (16 July 1933 – 27 November 2023) was a German businessman. He was a major shareholder in the Dürr AG, founded in Stuttgart in 1895. Dürr was chairman of the board of AEG from 1980 to 1990, and from 1991 to 1994 he served as executive board chairman of Deutsche Bundesbahn and Deutsche Reichsbahn. When the privatized Deutsche Bahn was formed then, Dürr was its first chairman of the board until 1997.

== Life and career ==
Dürr was born in Stuttgart on 16 July 1933 and, aged 12, attended the National-Political Institute of Learning in Rottweil in 1944–1945. He completed his secondary school education in post-war West Germany in 1953. He was a major shareholder in the Stuttgart-based engineering firm Dürr AG, founded by his grandfather in 1895.

Dürr was chairman of the board of AEG from 1980 to 1990, and from 1991 he served as executive board chairman of Deutsche Bundesbahn and Deutsche Reichsbahn, Germany's state-owned railways. When these enterprises were combined and privatized in 1994, Dürr became the first chairman of the board of the new Deutsche Bahn, a position he held until 1997. He is credited with the invention of the weekend discount ticket (Schönes- Wochenende-Ticket), which led to a notable increase in local railway traffic in Germany.

Dürr died on 27 November 2023, at the age of 90.
