= Aiways =

Chinese automobile manufacturer

Aiways Automobiles Co Ltd
- Industry: Automotive
- Founded: 2017; 9 years ago
- Founder: Fu Qiang; Gu Feng
- Headquarters: Shanghai, China
- Products: Electric cars
- Number of employees: 251-500+ approx. (2019)
- Website: www.ai-ways.eu

Aiways
- Traditional Chinese: 愛馳汽車
- Simplified Chinese: 爱驰汽车
Transcriptions
Standard Mandarin
- Hanyu Pinyin: Aìchí Qìchē

Aiways Automobiles Company Ltd is a Chinese automobile manufacturer of electric cars founded in 2017. The Aiways name is derived from the phrase "Ai (meaning 'love' in Chinese) is on the way".

== History ==
=== Beginnings ===
Startup Aiways was founded by two Chinese entrepreneurs, Fu Qian and Gu Feng, in 2017 in Shanghai. From the very beginning, the goal was to develop a range of SUVs with electric drive. A study preview of the first production Aiways vehicle was the prototype U5 Ion Concept presented in November 2018, with plans to introduce the series character next spring. On the occasion of the first study, Aiways announced sales plans concerning not only the domestic Chinese market, but also European.

In line with previous announcements, the first production car of the Aiways brand was the mid-size SUV U5 presented in March 2019. In January 2020, Aiways announced the official European debut of the U5 at Geneva Motor Show 2020, thus becoming the first fully Chinese brand to officially start selling an electric car in this region.

Due to the cancellation of the Geneva Motor Show as a result of the COVID-19 pandemic, the premiere of Aiways U5 did not take place. The start of sales of the model in selected Western European markets is scheduled for August 2020. In July 2020, the first transport of 500 U5 units will arrive in Europe, which will operate as part of the Hertz car rental company in the French Corsica. In April 2021, Aiways introduced its second production car in the form of a mid-size SUV Coupe called U6. The vehicle has an avant-garde design, for which former stylist Ferrari, Ken Okuyama was responsible.

In December 2022, Aiways won a contract to supply up to 150,000 EVs from Thai e-mobility service provider Phoenix EV.

=== Crisis and reactivation ===
In mid-2023, the company's financial situation collapsed, which led to the suspension of employee salaries and production stoppages. Then, in August 2023, the current president of the company left and was replaced by a new manager who decided to restructure. He decided to intensify his activities on foreign markets, withdrawing Aiways from the domestic, too difficult Chinese market and preparing to rebuild its plans for the European market. At the beginning of 2024, Aiways was on the verge of bankruptcy, from which Aiways was protected from Chinese state authorities in March 2024 and together with Haima and Zhidou provided stable financing for the resumption of full-scale operations.

In May 2024, Aiways announced that it was exiting the Chinese market due to extreme price competition, and will focus on sales in Europe and other overseas countries. Simultaneously, it announced that it will launch a public listing on Nasdaq in a $400 million USD deal with Hudson Acquisition, an American takeover SPAC, by the end of 2024. It will move its headquarters to Europe sometime after the merger, which will handle marketing, sales and finance, while R&D and production will continue in existing facilities in China. Previous investors of Aiways, CATL and DiDi, will continue to be shareholders after the merger.

=== Gumpert Aiways ===
In 2017, German engineer and entrepreneur Roland Gumpert, after his company Gumpert went bankrupt and was sold to Hong Kong investors, who changed its name to Apollo Automobil, decided to create a new business initiative. He entered into cooperation with the Chinese Aiways, creating the company Gumpert Aiways Automobile. In 2021, it was planned to produce a hybrid coupe RG Nathalie, however, it did not materialize and the company remained inactive at the beginning of the third decade of the 21st century.

== Sales strategy ==
Sales of the vehicles produced in Shangrao started in December 2019 in China. In Europe, the first models are due to hit the stores in mid-2020. Instead of being carried by ship, the vehicles are to be transported by train, which should reduce the transport time from six weeks to 16 days. The vehicles are to be sold in Germany via Euronics Deutschland, a cooperative chain of independent consumer electronics and white goods retailers. Maintenance and spare parts logistics are to be carried out by the cooperation partner A.T.U.

== Facilities ==
The company has Global headquarters in Shanghai, China plus European headquarters and R&D centre in Munich, Germany.

=== Shangrao Production Base ===
Aiways invested ¥13.3 billion in building a factory in Shangrao. The factory is engineered to Industry 4.0 standards and uses a cloud-based monitoring system developed by Siemens. The plant operates using products from Swiss-Swedish robotics supplier, ABB, which deliver 90% automation across the plant. In the body shop, robots supplied by German company Kuka join the chassis components and body panels.

The paint shop was built by German plant manufacturer Eisenmann and the assembly shop was erected by German manufacturing specialists Durr.

The factory currently produces the Aiways U5 and will be able to produce 300,000 vehicles per year when operating at full capacity.

=== Battery Production Factory ===
In 2018 Aiways started producing battery packs at its plant in Changshu, Jiangsu, China. The factory produces Aiways' patented ‘sandwich’ structure battery pack which is used in the Aiways U5 and U6 models.

== Technology ==
- Battery pack with sandwich structure – the pack is made of 24 high energy density modules supplied by CATL. The battery and electronics were designed in house at Aiways. The sandwich battery structure gets its name from the multi-layer protection separating dry and wet areas within the cell.
- More Adaptable Structure (MAS) platform – U5 and U6 are built on a modular and scalable vehicle platform which allows for the fitment of different powertrains

== Notable Safety Features ==
Aiways vehicles come with various Advanced Driver Assistance Systems (ADAS) as standard including:

- Emergency Brake Assist (EBA) automatically applies the car's brakes when a pedestrian, cyclist of vehicle passes in front of the car.
- Lane Keeping Assist (LKA) - Between 60 km/h and 120 km/h the system warns the driver if they are about to stray from their lane and makes necessary adjustments to the steering if the driver does not. It also makes an audible warning if the driver's hands are off the steering wheel for more than eight second
- Blind Spot Detection – alerts the driver with a sound and a light if a vehicle or cyclist is passing in the vehicles blind spot
- Forward Collision Warning – detects vehicles and pedestrians in front of the car and sounds an alarm if approaching at more than 10 km/h
- Rear Cross Traffic Alert – warns the driver when a vehicle is about to pass behind the car

== Production Vehicles ==
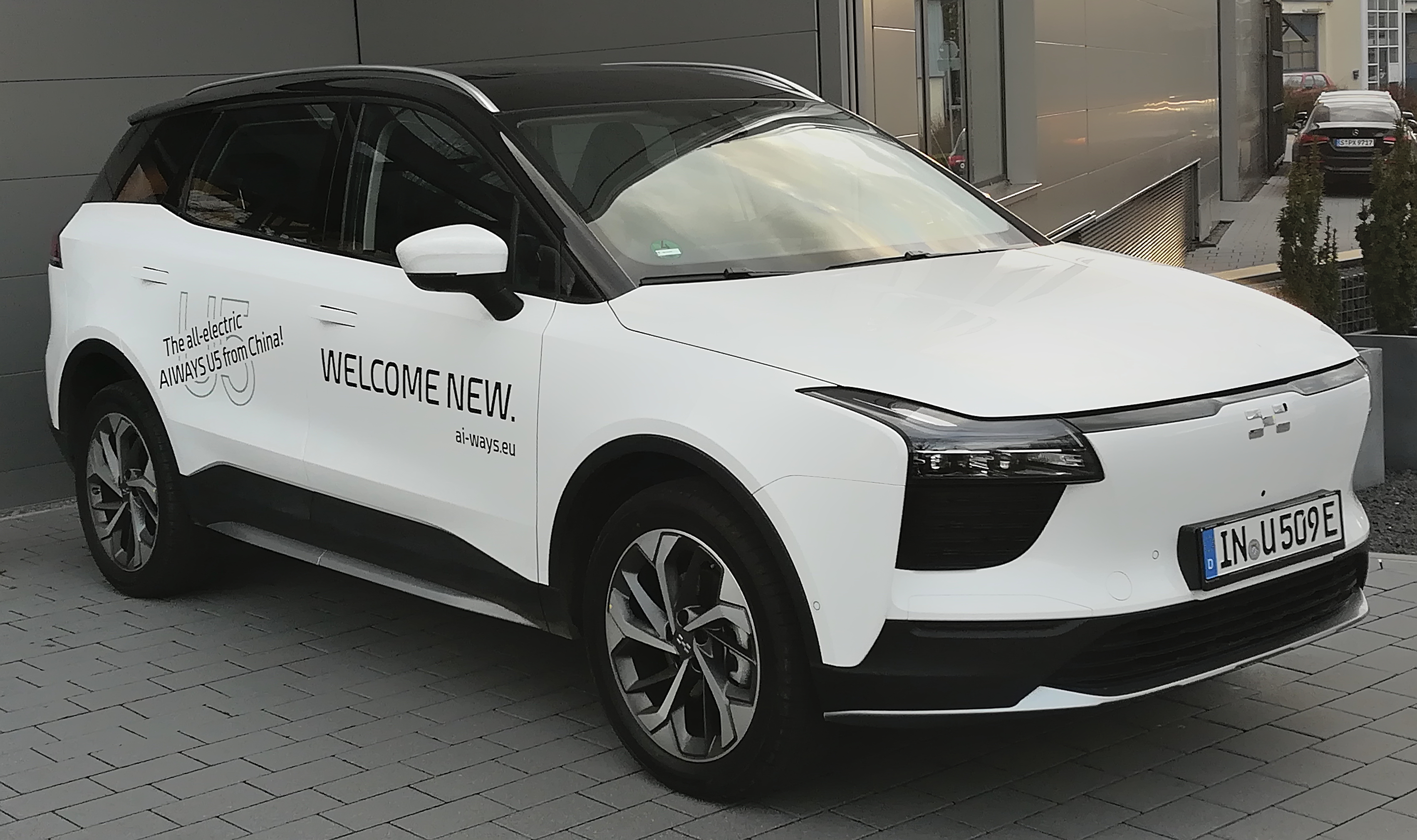
Aiways U5

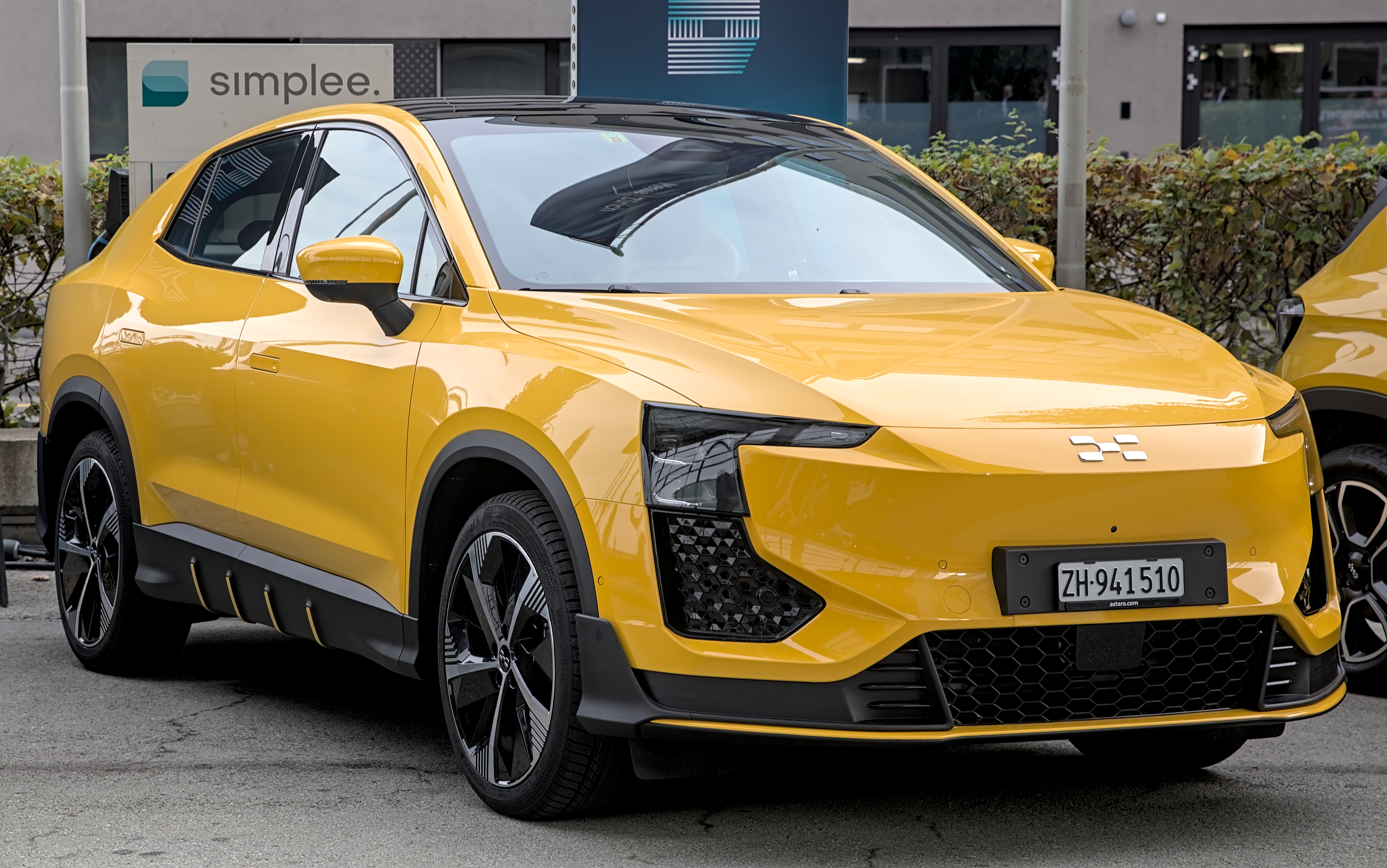
Aiways U6

=== Aiways U5 ===
The Aiways U5 is Aiways' first vehicle, and is a 4.68m long electric CUV. It was presented at the Geneva Motor Show in March 2019 and was launched in China in December 2019. Exports from China began in 2020 and the U5 is now sold in Belgium, Denmark, France, Germany, Israel, Italy, La Reunion, Suisse (Garage Emplatures) and the Netherlands.

In 2021 the U5 was given a 'facelift' which included new convenience technology features, new paint colors and a new 63kWh battery.

=== Aiways U6 ===
The Aiways U6 is Aiways' second vehicle, a CUV with an aerodynamic design of the U6 is heavily influenced by the U6 ion concept, its design sitting somewhere between coupe and more traditional crossover. The U6 will go on sale in China by the end of 2021 and in Europe at the beginning of 2022.

== Concept Vehicles ==
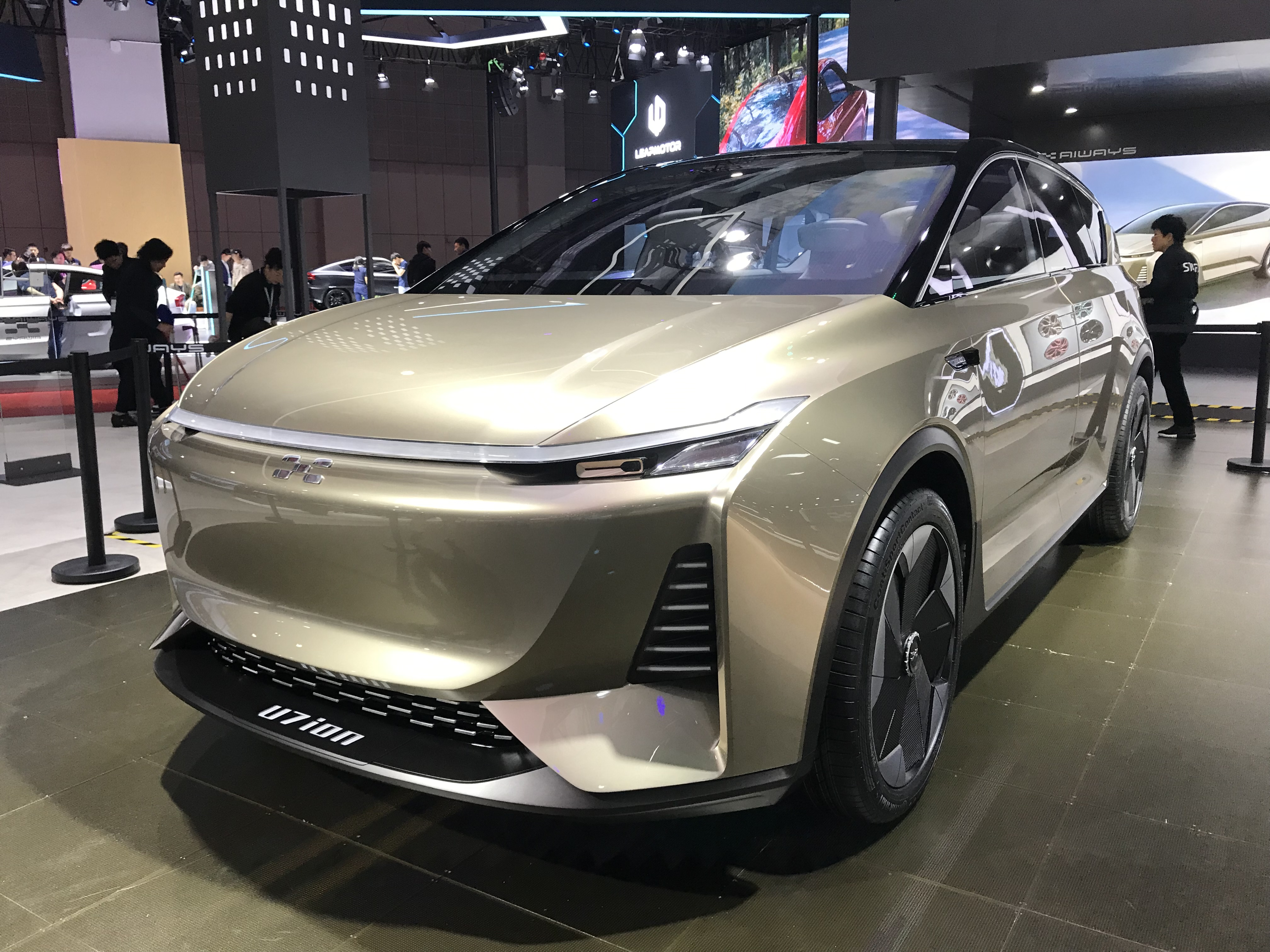
Aiways U7 ion

=== Aiways U6 ion ===
The manufacturer's concept car Aiways U6 ion, which was to be presented at the Geneva Motor Show 2020, as an SUV Coupé. Due to the COVID-19 virus pandemic the vehicle could not be delivered from China to Europe. Regardless, the debut was expected to take place remotely through a live conference at the Geneva Motor Show in Geneva, Switzerland. As the Swiss government banned events with more than 1,000 participants on 28 February 2020 due to the epidemic, the Geneva Motor Show was canceled. The planned press conference finally took place on 3 March 2020 in Leonberg.

=== Aiways U7 ion ===
The Aiways U7 ion concept car was unveiled at Auto Shanghai in 2019 to demonstrate the companies 'FRM' concept (family, roomy mobility). It featured a self-learning robot which can move around the vehicle and smart mobile console with touch screen that can move around the cabin.

== Supply Chain Partners ==
Aiways works with various technology suppliers from Europe to manufacture its range of vehicles.

- Robert Bosch – supplies the electric power steering in the U5
- Benteler Automotive – developed the U5's body in white from an aluminium and steel mix
- Georg Fischer – provides the bonding, casting and forming techniques that make the U5 body 50% stiffer than the equivalent steel body
- Autoneum – interior materials and upholstery
- Grupo Antolin – interior materials and upholstery

== Gumpert Aiways Automobile ==
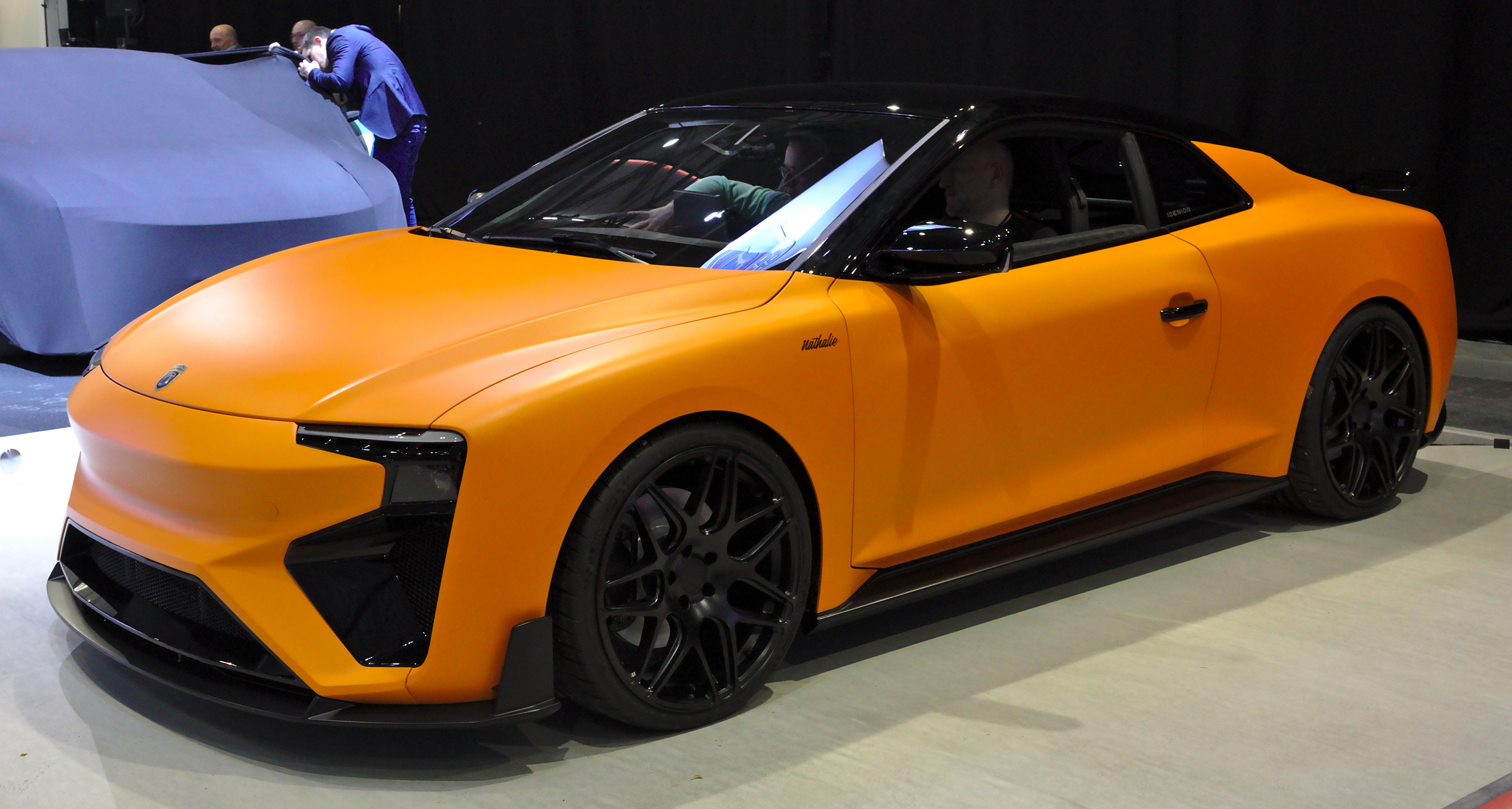
Gumpert Nathalie

Gumpert Aiways Automobile was a subsidiary based in Ingolstadt, Germany, which is managed by Roland Gumpert. The methanol fueled vehicle Gumpert Nathalie was the first model of this company.
