= AEG (German company) =

1883–1996 German electronics company

AEG Daimler-Benz Industrie AG

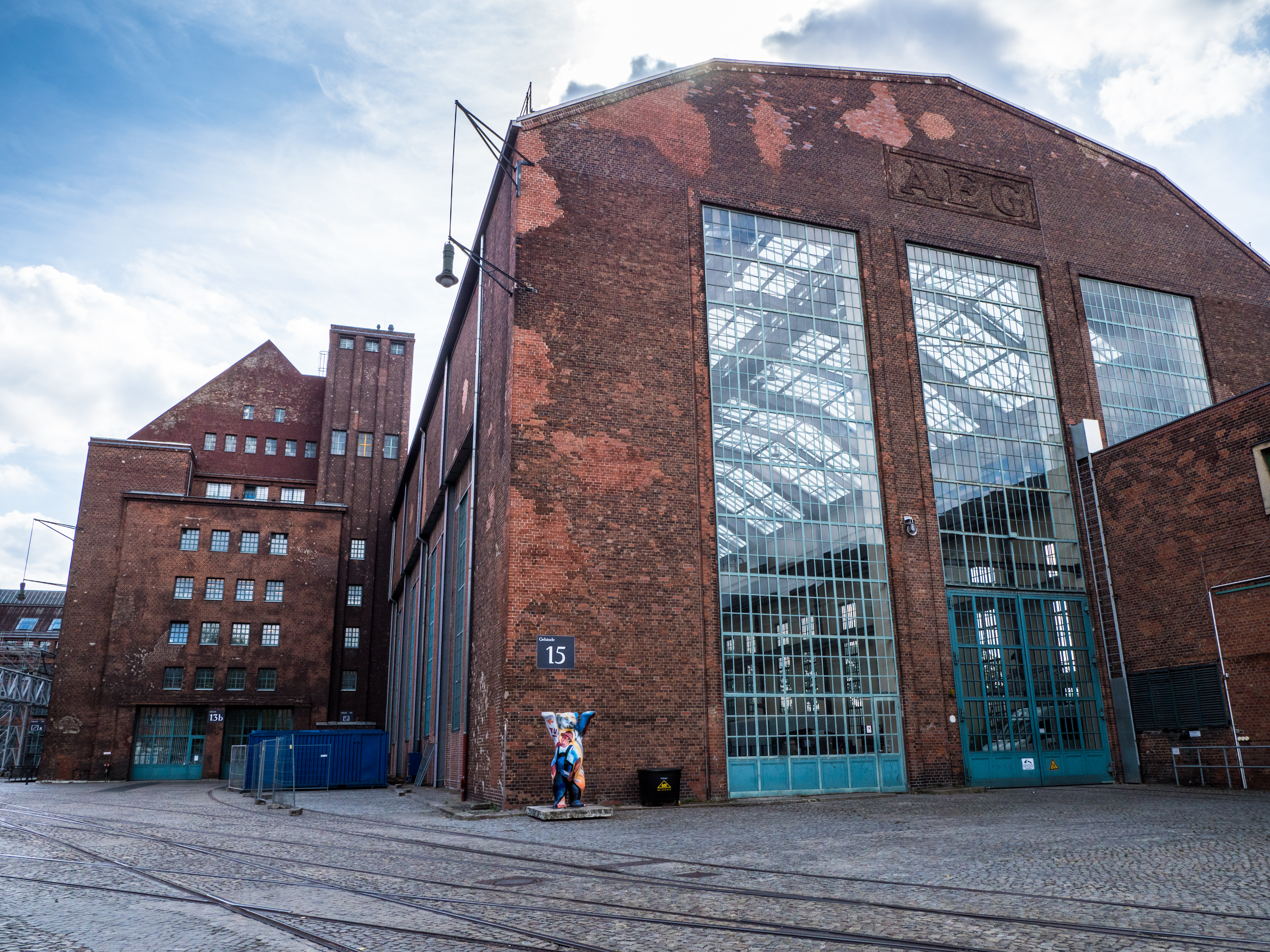
- AEG first headquarters
- Formerly: Deutsche Edison-Gesellschaft für angewandte Elektrizität AG (1883–1887); Allgemeine Elektrizitäts-Gesellschaft AG (1887–1967); Allgemeine Elektrizitäts-Gesellschaft AEG-Telefunken AG (1967–1979); AEG-Telefunken AG (1979–1985); AEG AG (1985–1994)
- Type: Private
- Industry: Automotive; Electrical; Home appliance; Aerospace
- Predecessor: Gesellschaft für elektrische Unternehmungen
- Founded: April 19, 1883; 143 years ago
- Founder: Emil Rathenau
- Defunct: October 2, 1996
- Fate: Merged into Daimler-Benz; household appliances division sold to Electrolux
- Successor: Daimler-Benz
- Headquarters: Berlin, later Frankfurt am Main, Germany
- Area served: Worldwide
- Key people: Ernst Stöckl
- Products: Electrical power generation and transmission; Telecommunications; Automation; Transportation and automotive; Home appliances; Personal care; Machine tools; Projectors; Printing equipment and supplies
- Revenue: ▼DM 20.5 billion (1995)
- Number of employees: 11,000 (1995)
- Parent: Daimler-Benz

AEG (Allgemeine Elektrizitäts-Gesellschaft lit. "General Electricity Company") was a German electrical equipment manufacturer founded in 1883 by Emil Rathenau in Berlin. While the company is officially defunct as of 1996, the brand is currently owned (since 2005) and used by Swedish company Electrolux, which also licenses it to various brand partners.

The company's initial focus was driven by electrical lighting, as in 1881, Rathenau had acquired the rights to the electric light bulb at the International Exposition of Electricity in Paris. Using small power stations, his company introduced electrical lighting to cafés, restaurants, and theaters, despite the high costs and limitations. By the end of the 19th century, AEG had constructed 248 power stations, providing a total of 210,000 hp of electricity for lighting, tramways, and household devices.

During the Second World War, AEG worked with the Nazi Party and benefited from forced labor in Nazi concentration camps. After the war, its headquarters moved to Frankfurt am Main. In 1967, AEG joined with its subsidiary Telefunken. In 1982, AEG-Telefunken had to file for bankruptcy, after which in 1985, Daimler-Benz purchased AEG. The company was eventually carved up in the 1990s: after its naval, radar and defense electronics became part of Deutsche Aerospace, its rail infrastructure became part of Adtranz, its electrical grid business sold to GEC Alsthom, and other divisions sold to others. Its diesel engine division, automotive electronics and postal automation parts were directly integrated into Daimler-Benz, and AEG formally dissolved in 1996.

== Name ==
During its lifetime, the company was known under various names, including AEG Daimler-Benz Industrie AG, Deutsche Edison-Gesellschaft für angewandte Elektrizität AG, Allgemeine Elektrizitäts-Gesellschaft AG, Allgemeine Elektrizitäts-Gesellschaft AEG-Telefunken AG, AEG-Telefunken AG and AEG AG.

== History ==
=== Summary ===
Founder Emil Rathenau

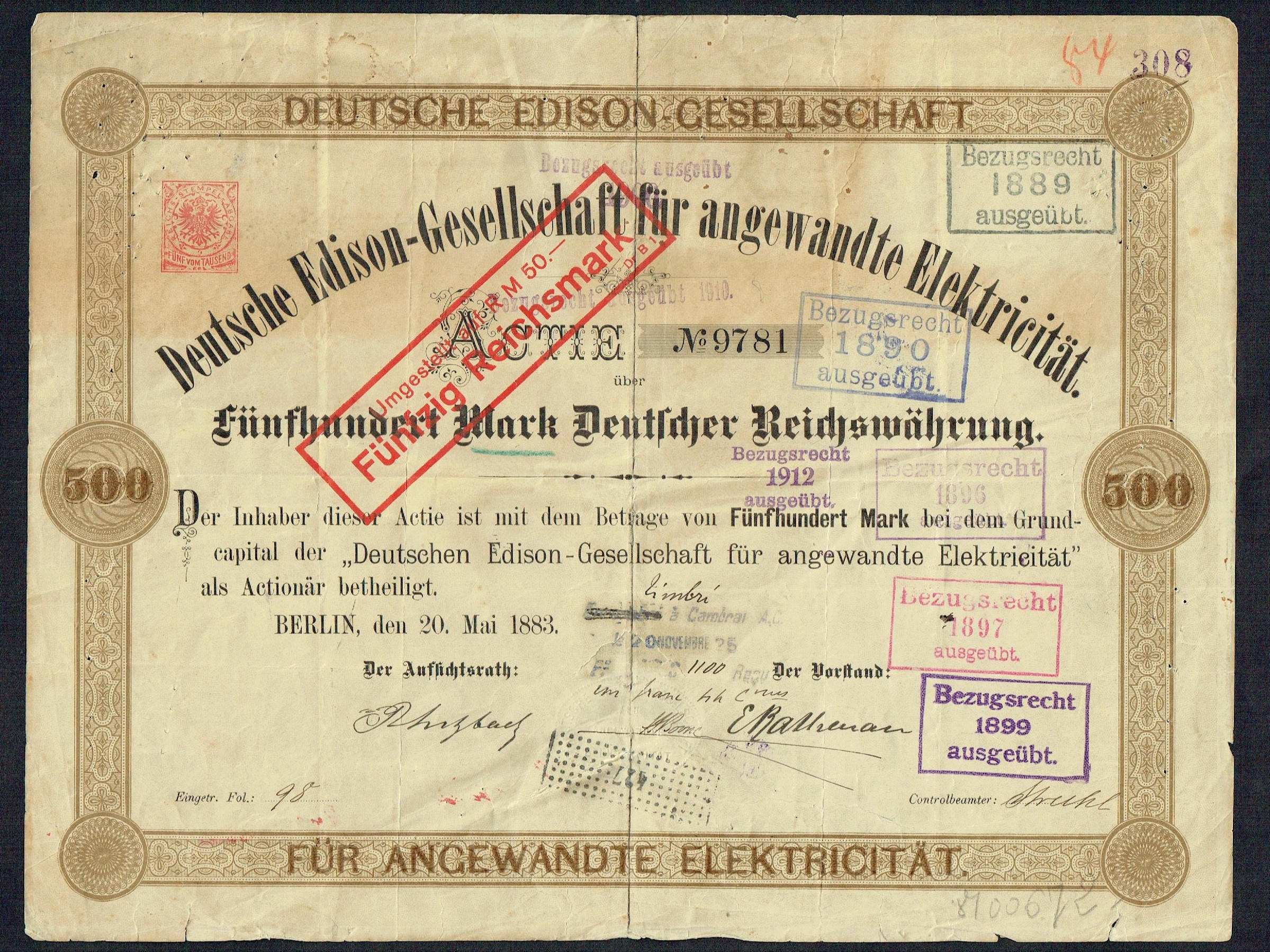
Share of the Deutsche Edison-Gesellschaft für angewandte Elektricität, issued 20 May 1883

In 1883, Emil Rathenau founded Deutsche Edison-Gesellschaft für angewandte Elektricität in Berlin. In 1888, it was renamed as Allgemeine Elektricitäts-Gesellschaft. Initially producing electrical equipment (such as light bulbs, motors, and generators), the company soon became involved in AC electric-transmission systems. In 1907, Peter Behrens was appointed as artistic consultant to AEG. This led to the creation of the company's initial corporate identity, with products and advertising sharing common design features.

The company expanded in the first half of the 20th century, and it is credited with a number of firsts and inventions in electrical engineering. During the same period, it entered the automobile and airplane markets. Electrical equipment for railways was produced during this time, beginning a long history of supplying the German railways with electrical equipment. According to the 1930 Encyclopædia Britannica: "Prior to 1923, it was the largest electrical manufacturing concern in Germany and one of the most important industrial undertakings in the world."

During the Second World War, AEG joined with other large companies such as IG Farben, Thyssen, and Krupp in their support of the Nazis. The company benefited from the use of large numbers of forced labourers, as well as concentration-camp prisoners, under inhuman conditions of work.

After WWII, the company lost its businesses in the eastern part of Germany. After a merger in 1967, the company was renamed Allgemeine Elektricitäts-Gesellschaft AEG-Telefunken, and from 1979 on, only as AEG-Telefunken. The company experienced financial difficulties during the 1970s, resulting in the sale of some assets. In 1983, the consumer electronics division Telefunken Fernseh und Rundfunk was sold. In 1985, the company retook the name AEG and the remainder of the company was acquired by Daimler-Benz; the parts that remained were primarily related to electric power distribution and electric motor technology. Under Daimler-Benz ownership, the former AEG companies eventually became part of the newly named Adtranz in 1995, and the AEG name was no longer used. Electrolux, which had already acquired the household subsidiary AEG Hausgeräte in 1994, now own the rights to use and license the AEG brand.

=== Foundation to 1940 ===
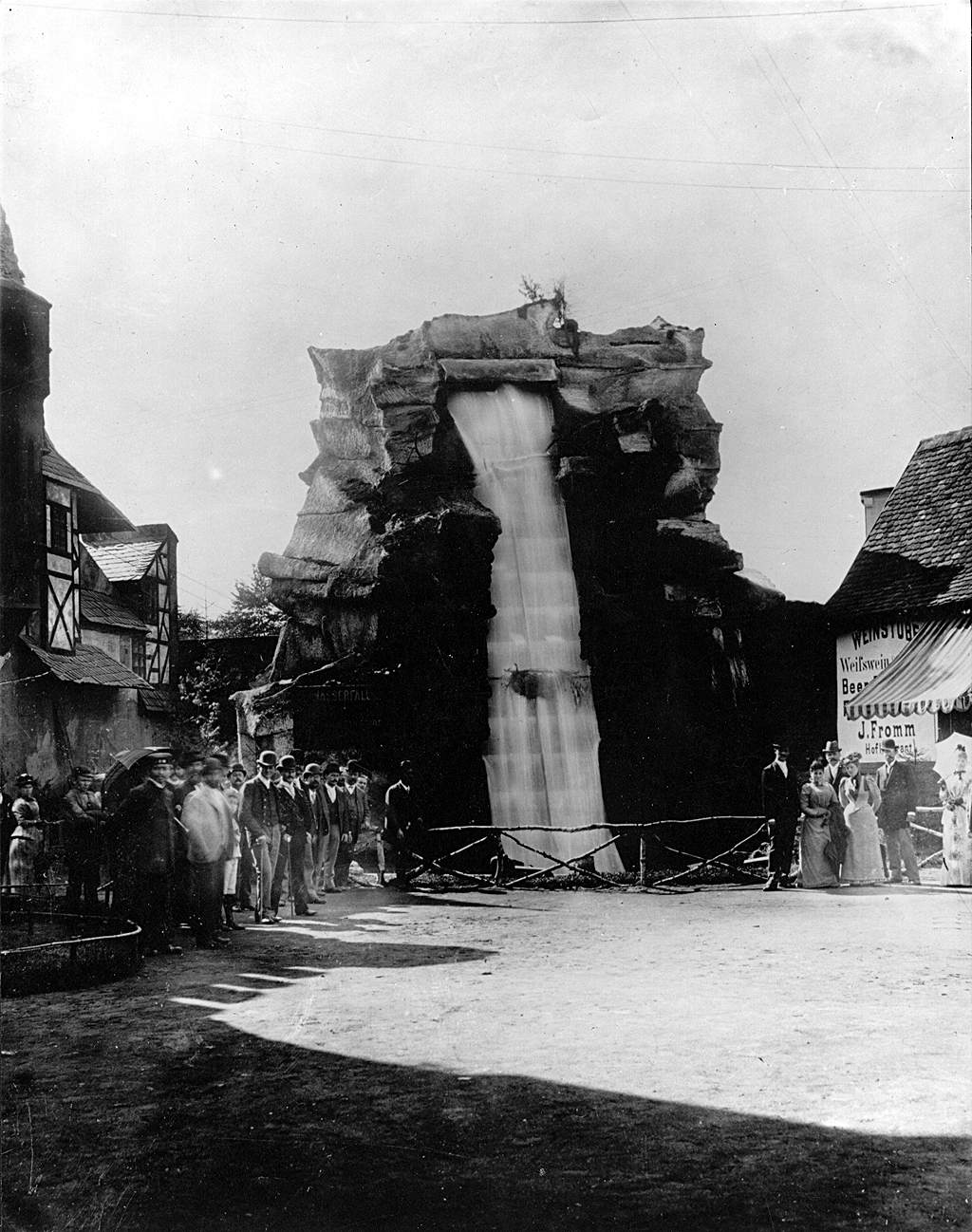
Artificial electrically powered waterfall at the International Electro-Technical Exhibition – 1891

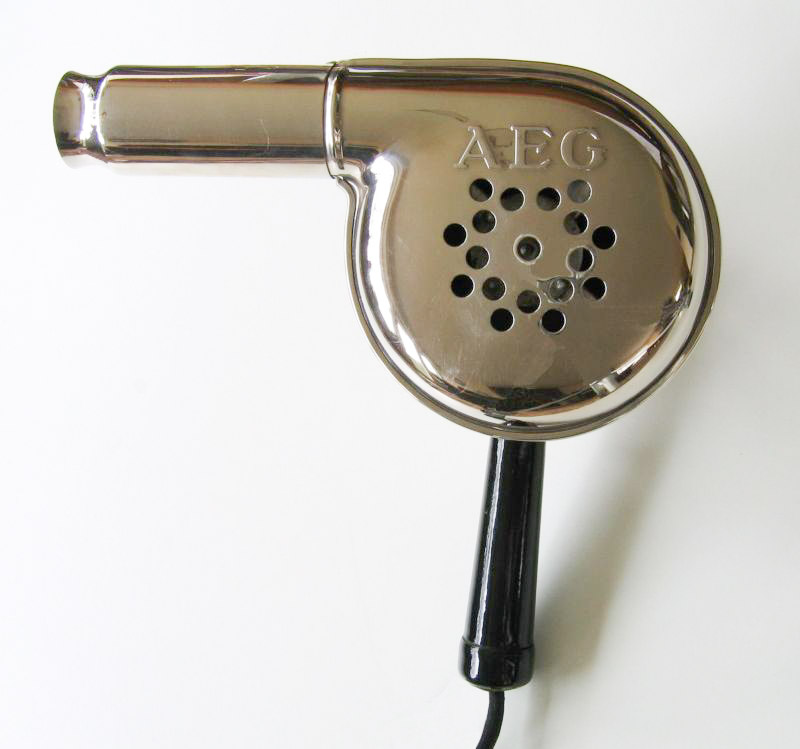
AEG Foen (hair dryer), 1930s

The company originated in 1882, when Emil Rathenau acquired licences to use some of Thomas Edison's lamp patents in Germany. (Note: Timeline 1882) The Deutsche Edison Gesellschaft ("German Edison Company") was founded in 1883 with the financial backing of banks and private individuals, with Emil Rathenau as company director. (Note: Timeline 1883)

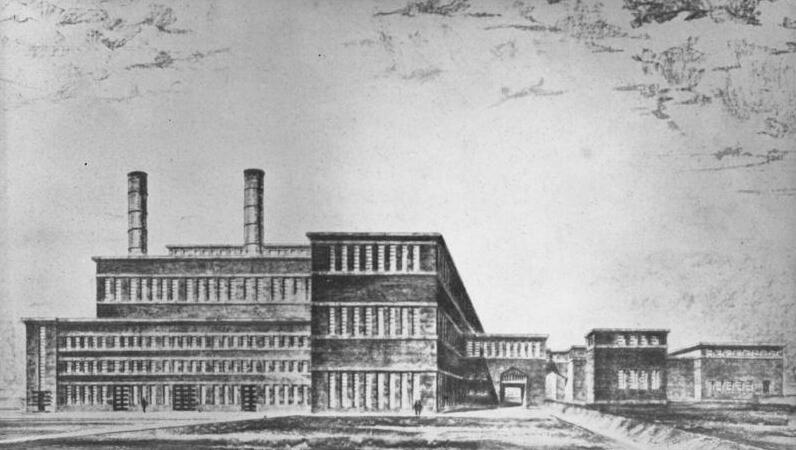
AEG power station built in 1930. Kryvyi Rih city.

In 1884, Munich-born engineer Oskar von Miller (who later founded Deutsches Museum) joined the executive board. The same year, the company entered negotiations with the Berlin Magistrat (the municipal body) to supply electricity to a large area from a central supply, which resulted in the formation of the Städtischen Elektrizitätswerke (A.G.StEW) ("City electricity works company (Berlin)") on 8 May 1884. (Note: Timeline 1884)

The original factory was located near Stettiner Bahnhof. In 1887, the company acquired land in the Berlin-Gesundbrunnen area on which the Weddingsche Maschinenfabrik (founded by Wilhelm Wedding) was previously located. In the same year, in addition to a restructuring and expansion of the production range, the AEG name was adopted. (Note: Timeline 1885–1887)

In 1887, Mikhail Dolivo-Dobrowolsky joined the company as chief engineer, later becoming vice-director. His work on polyphase electric power led him to become the world's leading engineer in three-phase electric power systems at the end of the 1880s. (Note: Timeline 1888–1889)

In 1891, Miller and Dobrovolski demonstrated the transmission of electrical power over a distance of 175 km (109 mi) from a hydroelectric power plant in Lauffen am Neckar to Frankfurt, where it lit 1000 light bulbs and drove an artificial waterfall at the International Electrotechnical Exhibition in Frankfurt am Main. This success marked one of beginnings of the general use of alternating current for electrification in Germany, and showed that distance transmission of electric power could be economically useful. In the same year, the Stadtbahn Halle/Saale (City railway Halle–Saale) opened the first electric tram system (of notable size) in Germany. (Note: Timeline 1890–1891)

Tropp Paul began his work for the AEG from 1889/90 until 1893, and Franz Schwechten designed the facades of the Acker- und Hussitenstraße in 1894–95.

In 1894, the site of the former Berlin Viehmarktgasse (cattle market alley) was purchased. This had a railroad siding connecting to the Berlin rail network, but no rail connection existed between the two plants. In 1895, an underground railway link between the two plots was built in a tunnel 270 meters long. The tunnel was built by Siemens & Halske under the direction of C. Schwebel and Wilhelm Lauter, who were also connected in the building of what is now the Spree tunnel Stralau used by the U-Bahn.

By 1889, AEG were known as specialists in the construction of industrial portable drilling machines, some of which were driven by flexible shafts from electric motors. AEG also developed a toothed-belt drive to reduce motor speed down to that required by machine tools.

In 1903, the competing radio companies AEG and Siemens & Halske merged, forming a joint subsidiary named Telefunken. (Note: Timeline 1903)

In 1907, architect Peter Behrens became an artistic adviser. (Note: Timeline 1904–1907) Responsible for the design of all products, advertising, and architecture, he has since become considered as the world's first corporate designer. Behren's philosophy was to create a building which is solid, strong and simple in its structure. It is perfect for doing its job of producing large, heavy machinery. The dimensions of the building were chosen to allow turbines to be transported above other machinery.

In the 1920s, AEG became a global supplier of electrical know-how and equipment. In 1923, for example, it provided most of the essential materials and a team of engineers to oversee the electrification of British-ruled Palestine. British firms, at the time, could not compete with the prices of AEG.

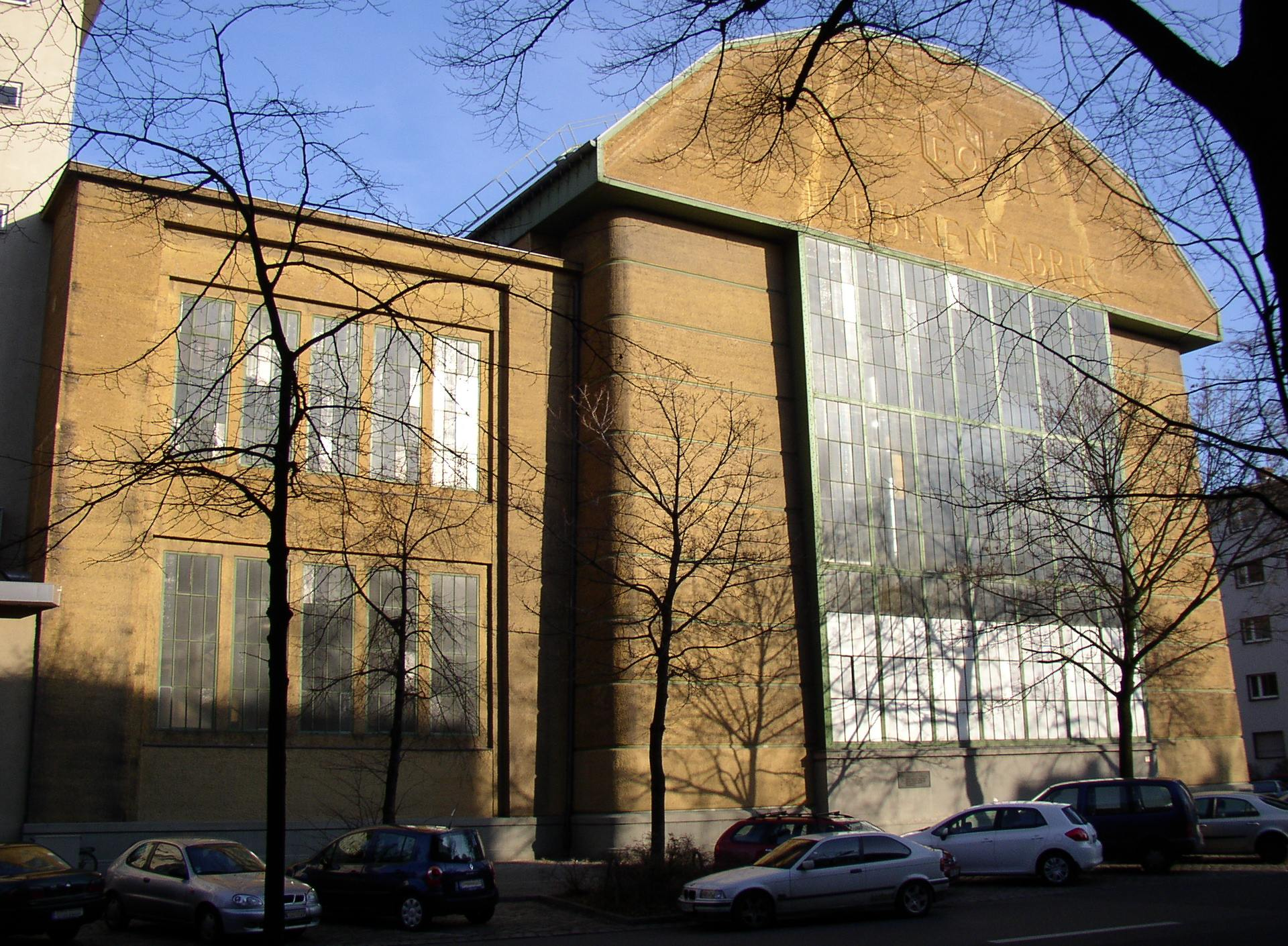
AEG turbine factory (1909, architect Peter Behrens)

The activity of the company soon extended to all areas of electrical power engineering, including electric lighting, electric power, electric railways, and electrochemical plants, as well as the construction of steam turbines, automobiles, cables, and cable materials. In the first decades, the company had many factories in and around Berlin:

- Maschinenfabrik Brunnenstrasse (steam turbines, dynamos, electric motors)
- Apparatewerk Ackerstrasse (carbon-filament and metal thread light bulbs, Nernst lamps, switches, fuses, resistors, electrical measuring equipment, dynamos, electric motors)
- Kabelwerk Oberspree (KWO, cables, copper and metal works, rubber fabrication, insulator fabrication)
- Transformatorenwerk Oberspree (TRO, transformers)
- Glühlampenfabrik Moabit (1907–1912, carbon-filament and metal thread light bulbs, Nernst lamps, Vacuum tubes) — later became part of Osram, from 1939 on Telefunken
- Turbinenfabrik (1909, steam turbines) — famous as an example of industrial architecture
- Apparate-Werke Treptow (AT – 1926, arc lamps, switches, fuses, controls, starters, electrical measuring equipment)

A number of other notable events involving AEG occurred in this period:

- 1900: Invention of the hairdryer
- 1901: The Neue Automobil Gesellschaft ("New Automotive Company") became part of AEG through the takeover of Allgemeine Automobil-Gesellschaft. (Note: Timeline 1900–1901)
- 27 October 1903: An AEG-equipped experimental three-phase railcar achieved a speed of 210.2 km/h (131 mph) on the test track of the Königlich Preußische Militär-Eisenbahn (Royal Prussian Military Railway) between Marienfelde and Zossen. This world speed record for rail vehicles was held until 1931.
- 1904: Merger of AEG with the Union-Elektricitäts-Gesellschaft (UEG) (literal: Union-electricity Company)
- 1910: Factory Hennigsdorf -entry into the aircraft building market (Note: Timeline 1910–1911)
- 1929: AEG produced its first compressor-driven refrigerators and temperature controlled irons. (Note: Timeline 1926–1930)
- 1933: AEG joined other large manufacturing companies to support Adolf Hitler.
- 1935: Presentation of the world's first tape device Magnetophon K1 based on work by Eduard Schüller at the Berlin Radio Show (Note: Timeline 1931–1935)
- 1941: AEG bought Siemens & Halske shares in Telefunken and the company became a subsidiary.

On 20 June 1915, founder Emil Rathenau died at age 77. (Note: Timeline 1915–1916)

=== The Nazi era and World War II ===
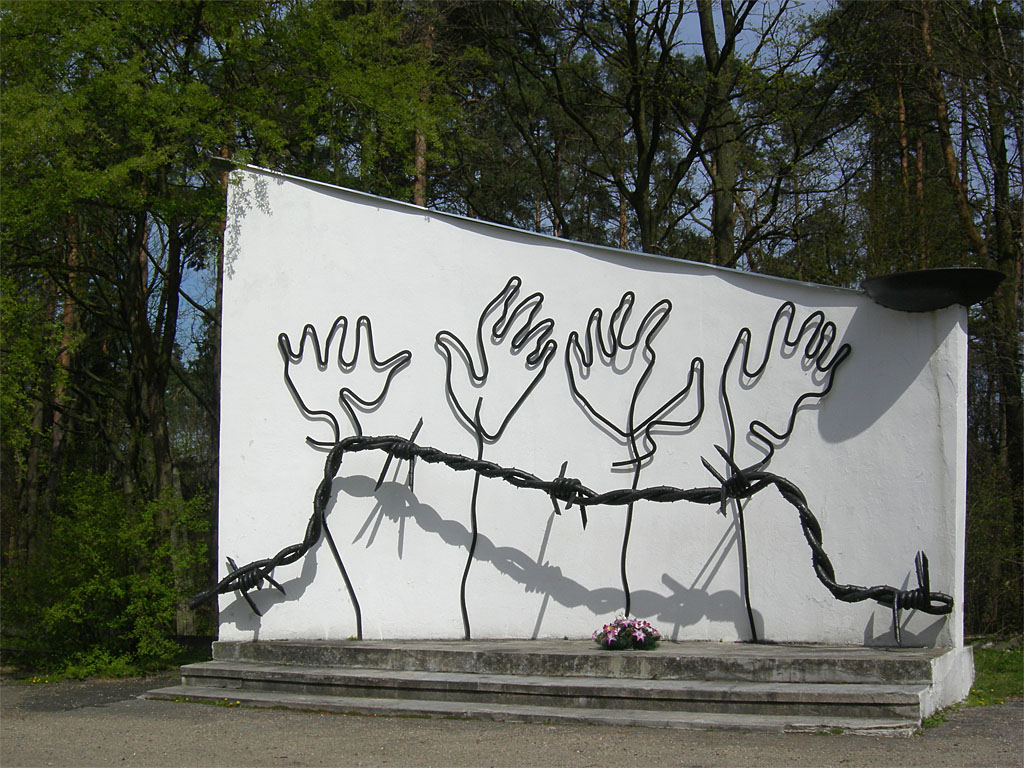
Memorial plaque for Polish forced labourers at AEG in Blechhammer camp near Auschwitz

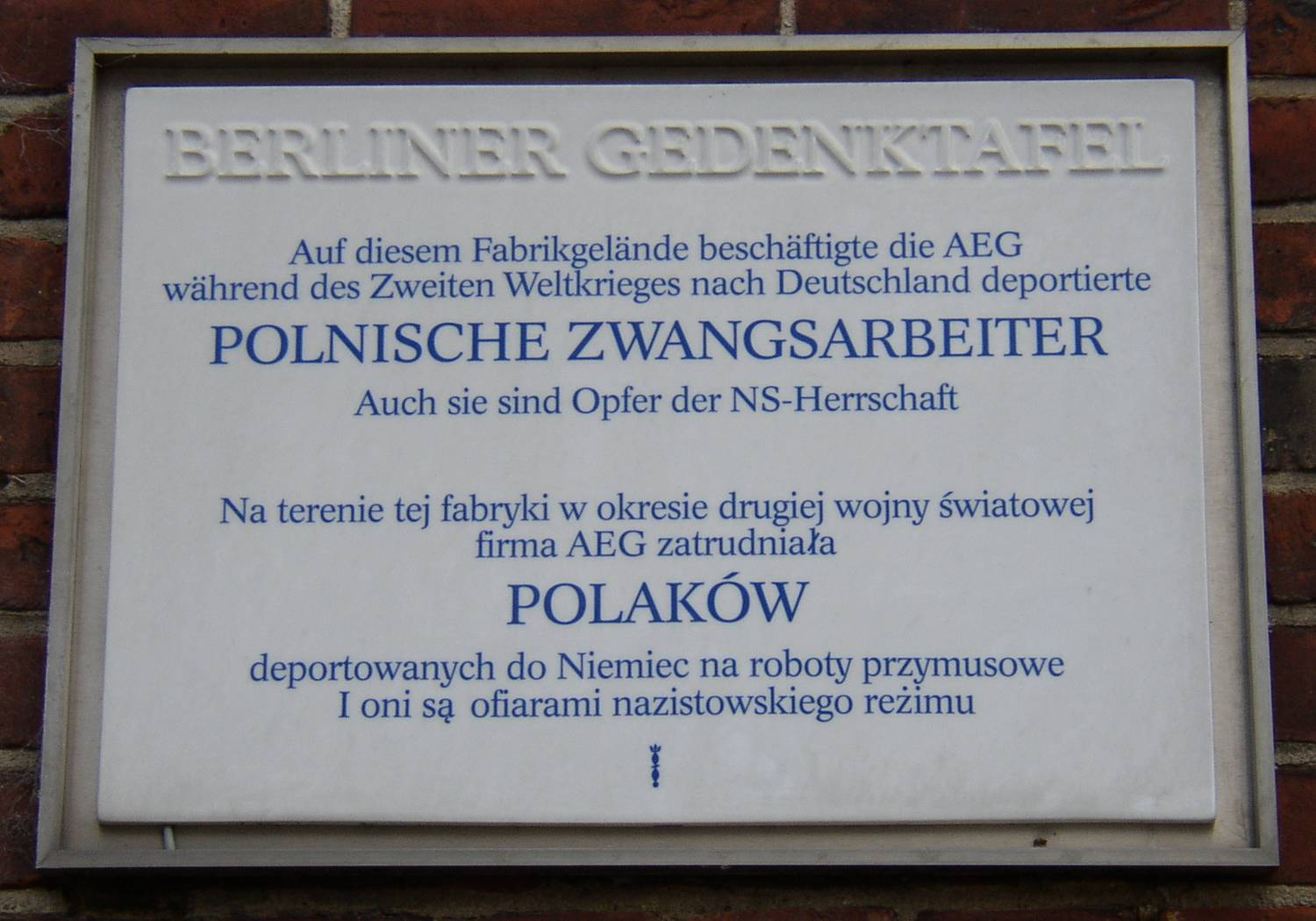
Berlin memorial plaque for Polish forced labourers at AEG in Berlin-Gesundbrunnen, Germany

AEG donated 60,000 Reichsmarks to the Nazi party after the Secret Meeting of 20 February 1933 at which the twin goals of complete power and national rearmament were explained by Hitler. They joined with other large companies, such as IG Farben, Thyssen and Krupp, in their support of the Nazis, especially in promoting re-armament of the Wehrmacht, Luftwaffe, and Kriegsmarine. During the war itself, they were to use large numbers of forced labourers as well as concentration camp prisoners, under inhuman conditions of work.

AEG worked extensively with the Nazi party in occupied Poland. AEG was forced to relinquish Kabelwerk Krakow, a cable manufacturing plant, to the Nazi party. Kabelwerk Krakow was located in Krakow-Plaszow and used forced Jewish labor manufacturing cables from 1942 to 1944. In 1943, AEG began to relocate goods and evacuate workers. Goods were relocated to various places, including Berlin and Sudetenland. When installing electric and lighting systems for the Waffen-SS training grounds in Dębica, AEG used forced labor from Jews placed in the Pustkow labor camp located in south east Poland.

During World War II, an AEG factory near Riga used female slave labour. AEG was also contracted for the production of electrical equipment at Auschwitz concentration camp.

AEG used slave labour from Camp No. 36 at the new sub-camp of Auschwitz III and also known as Monowitz, called "Arbeitslager Blechhammer". Most of them would die in 1945 during the death marches and finally in Buchenwald.

AEG was a major supplier of grips for P38 pistols manufactured by Walther Arms, Mauser, as well as on the early wartime Spreewerk P38s.

In an effort to express regret for its use of Jewish slave labour in World War II, AEG joined with Rheinmetall, Siemens, Krupp, and I G Farben to pay DEM75 million in reparations to the Jewish Claims Conference.

=== 1945 to 1970 ===
In 1945, after the Second World War, the production in the factories in the western sectors of Berlin – what today is the building of the headquarters of DW (TV)Deutsche Welle – and Nuremberg, Stuttgart and Mülheim resumed and further new works were erected, among others an Electric meter plant in Hameln.

The steam and electric locomotive plant in Hennigsdorf (Fabriken Hennigsdorf) became a Volkseigener Betrieb (VEB) (people owned enterprise) as the Lokomotivbau Elektrotechnische Werke (LEW) ("electric locomotive works"). The cable plant (Draht-, Kabel- und Metallwerk Oberspree) and apparatus factory (Apparatefabrik Treptow) and other facilities also lay in East Germany and became Sowjetische Aktiengesellschaft (SAG) (Soviet joint-stock companies). Over 90% of assets in Berlin lay in the Russian occupied zone and were lost.

The headquarters for the non-expropriated parts of the company was moved first to Hamburg and then finally to Frankfurt am Main, the headquarters in Berlin having been destroyed.

- 1948: The AEG factories Kassel (FK) were founded on the site of the former MWK Motorenbau Werk Kassel at Lilienthalstrasse 150 in Kassel/Hesse/Germany. The first factory part was the high voltage switchgear factory (HSF), later the refrigerator factory (KSF), the ticketprinter factory (FDF), the isolating material factory (IF) as well as the worldwide accepted high voltage institute (HI)were founded. In the early sixties more than 5000 people worked for AEG in Kassel. Today, the site Lilienthalstrasse still produces high voltage switchgear.
- 1950: The new corporate headquarters is at the Friedensbrücke (Peace Bridge) in Frankfurt / Main. The number of employees in the Group rose from 20,900 in September 1948 to 55,400 persons in September 1957. In the same year the turnover exceeded one billion DM for the first time, however the high level of investment in the rebuilding of the company (1948 to 1956 over 500 million DM) placed a considerable strain on the balance sheet.
- 1958: The slogan "Aus Erfahrung Gut" (benefit from experience) is introduced to explain the company name and acronym, leading to unflattering parodies such as "Auspacken, Einschalten, Geht nicht" (unpack, switch on, does not work) or "Alles Ein Gammel" (everything is 'gammy').
- 1962: The Group has 127,000 employees and generates annual sales of 3.1 billion DM. In Springe a new factory is opened in February 1962 a new factory for the production of fluid control units with 200 employees.
- 1962: Walter Bruch at Telefunken in Hannover develops PAL color television.
- 1966: The largest industrial space in Europe is created (175 m long, 45 m wide and 26 m high) for the construction using cranes of engines and generators with weights up to 400 tonnes. Robert F. Kennedy attends the opening.
- 1 January 1967: Merger with Telefunken creates AEG-Telefunken, headquartered in Frankfurt am Main.

=== 1970s onwards ===
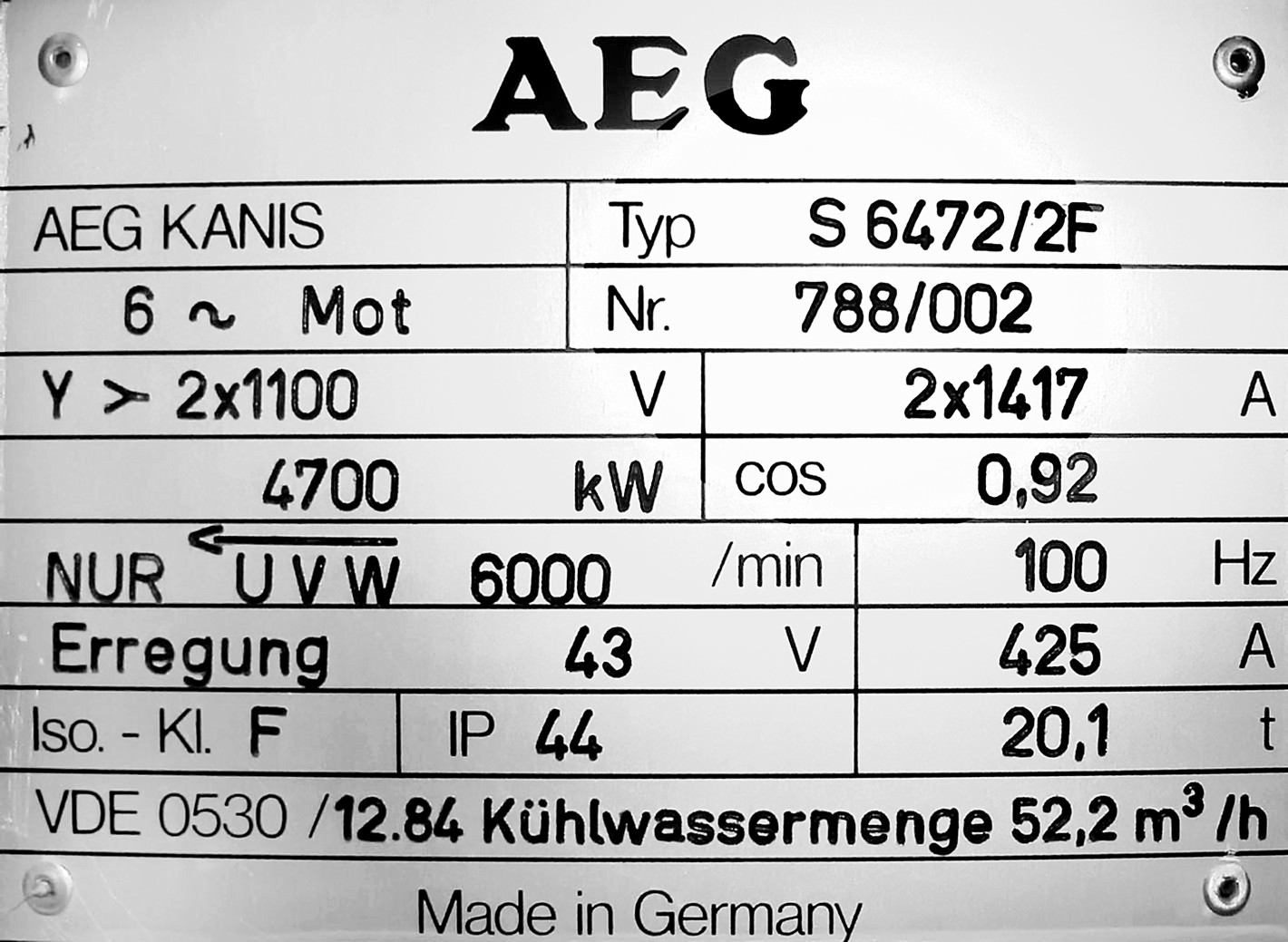
AEG electric motor builders plate

In 1970, AEG-Telefunken had 178,000 employees worldwide, and was the 12th largest electrical company in the world. The company was burdened by, among other things, unsuccessful projects such as an automated baggage conveyor system at Frankfurt Airport and nuclear powerplant construction. In particular, the nuclear power plant at Würgassen, the commissioning of which was delayed by several years due to technical problems cost AEG hundreds of millions of DM. As a result, the company paid its last dividend in 1972.

The entertainment arm (Telefunken Fernseh und Rundfunk) headquartered in Hanover was sold. This was followed by the computer mainframe business (TR 4, TR 10, TR 440) (a partnership under the name Telefunken Computer with the company Nixdorf) was sold to Siemens. The process computer (TR 84, TR 86, AEG 60–10, AEG 80–20, AEG 80–60) continued as Geschäftsbereich Automatisierungstechnik (after 1980 as ATM Computer).

In 1975 the former Telefunken Headquarter at Berlin-Charlottenburg, Ernst-Reuter-Platz 7 was sold. The building had been previously rented to Technische Universität Berlin.

In 1976, to circumvent the requirement of equal participation of employees in the supervisory board, Dr. Walter Cipa (Dipl.-Geol.) (AEG boss from 1976 to 1980) created four further companies as wholly owned joint stock companies in addition to the two household appliance companies. (The numbers in parentheses refer to percentage of turnover in 1980)

AEG-Telefunken Anlagentechnik (37%)
AEG-Telefunken Serienprodukte (16%)
AEG-Telefunken Kommunikationstechnik (6%)
Olympia-Werke (business office technology, 7%)
AEG-Hausgeräte (22%)
Telefunken Fernseh und Rundfunk (12%)

In 1979 Allgemeine Elektricitäts-Gesellschaft AEG-Telefunken was renamed AEG-Telefunken by dropping the supplement "Allgemeine Elektricitäts-Gesellschaft", used since 1887. In February 1980, Heinz Dürr became board Chairman (until 1990).

In August 1982 a restructuring plan, backed with federal guarantees of 600 million DM and new bank loans of 275 million DM, fell apart at the first disagreement between the banks. A banking consortium provided an administrative loan of DM 1.1 billion to the AEG Group until June 1983; 400 million of which only to be available on a guarantee by the federal government. Not only was AEG-Telefunken affected, but also its subsidiaries Küppersbusch in Gelsenkirchen, Hermann Zanker Maschinenfabrik in Tübingen and Carl Neff in Bretten. The Alno-Möbelwerke in Pfullendorf was taken over by the minority shareholders, and separated from the group.

The suppliers to AEG were affected and some filed for bankruptcy—including Becher & Co. Möbelfabriken in Bühlertann—with lack of continuity of company policy a factor. The site at Brunnenstraße in the former Berlin district of Wedding was also sold, as were the firms AEG-Fabrik Essen and Bauknecht.

- 1983/84: the consumer electronics division (Telefunken Television and Broadcasting) was sold to the French group Thomson-Brandt.
- 1985: AEG was taken over by Daimler-Benz. Daimler-Benz executive Edzard Reuter (from 1987 Daimler CEO), decides two companies should form an "integrated technology group" with beneficial synergy.
- 1988: On its 60th anniversary the AEG-Forschungsinstituts (AEG Research Institute) creates the Carl-Ramsauer Prize for scientific/technical dissertations.
- 1990: AEG Westinghouse Transportation Systems is formed in association with Westinghouse Transportation Systems.
- 1992: Merger (or re-uniting) of the railway business with the Lokomotivbau Elektrotechnische Werke (LEW) in Hennigsdorf, resulting in the formation of AEG Schienenfahrzeuge (AEG locomotives)
- 1992: The Swedish company Atlas Copco acquires AEG Power Tools; divested in 2004 to Techtronic Industries.
- 1994: sale of the Automation division to Schneider Electric and of AEG Hausgeräte to Electrolux.
- 1995: AEG Schienenfahrzeuge becomes part of ABB Daimler-Benz Transportation (Adtranz).
- 1996: The Annual General Meeting of Daimler-Benz chaired by Juergen Schrempp decides upon the dissolution of the lossmaking group.
- 1996: GEC ALSTHOM acquires AEG Power T&D business.
- September 1996: The company is deleted from the commercial register.

== Products ==
=== Locomotives and railway technology ===
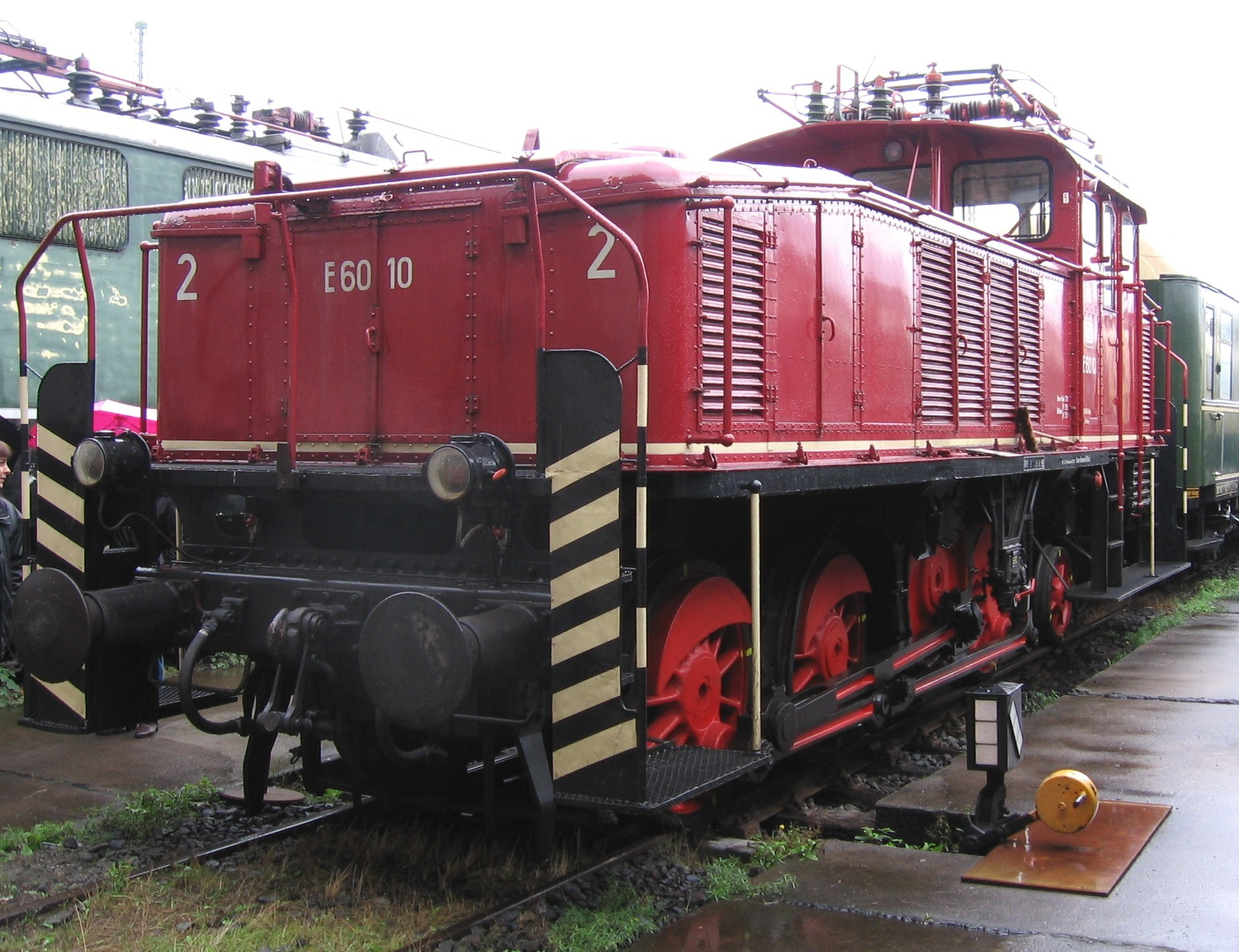
AEG electric locomotive

AEG played an important role in the history of the German railways; the company was involved in the development and manufacture of the electrical parts of almost all German electric locomotive series and contributed to the introduction of electrical power in German railways.

Additionally many steam locomotives were made in AEG factories. In 1931 the company acquired Borsig and transferred the locomotive production to the AEG-Borsig works (Borsig Lokomotiv-Werke) from the Borsig plant in Tegel. In 1948 the plant became VEB Lokomotivbau Elektrotechnische Werke. In addition to numerous electric locomotives produced for the DR steam locomotive production continued until 1954.

When the Federal Republic of Germany began implementing AC propulsion systems AEG found itself in competition with Brown, Boveri & Cie. The prototype DB Class E320 was built with Krupp as dual voltage (15 kV and 25 kV AC) test machine, the technology ultimately leading to locomotives such as DB Class 120 and ICE 1.

Only after German reunification and the adoption of the LEW plant in Hennigsdorf did AEG's name return to whole locomotive manufacturing, but only for a short time. "AEG locomotives" became part of ABB Daimler-Benz Transportation (later ADtranz) and currently the technology developed in the past, in part, now enables Alstom to build the Traxx series of locomotives.

AEG also built the Hellenic Railways TRAINOSE Class 520 DMUs between 1989/1990/1991 and 1994/1995/1996. Between 1992 to 1994, AEG built 96 metro cars for Shanghai Metro.

=== Aircraft ===
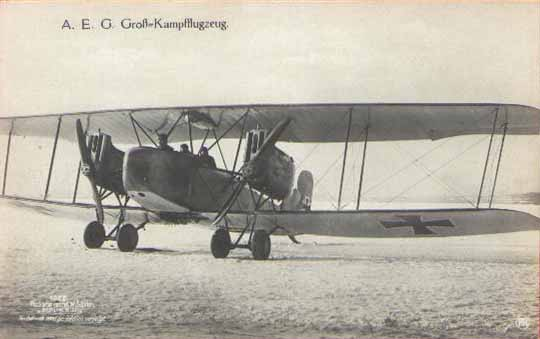
AEG G.IV bomber (World War I)

AEG manufactured a range of aircraft from 1912 to 1918. The first aircraft in 1912 was of wooden construction and modeled after the Wright brothers biplane. It had a wingspan of 17.5 m (57 ft 5 in); was powered by an eight-cylinder engine producing 75 hp; unloaded weight was 850 kg; and could attain a speed of 65 km/h (40 mph). From 1912, the construction of airplanes proceeded in mixed wood and steel tube construction with fabric covering.

One of the planes designed and built was a Riesenflugzeug ("giant aircraft") AEG R.I. This aircraft was powered by four 260 hp (190 kW) Mercedes D.IVa engines linked to a combination leather cone and dog clutch. The first flight tests were satisfactory, but on 3 September 1918, the R.I broke up in the air killing its seven crewmen.

The most successful in terms of production figures of all the AEG aircraft designs was that of the G.IV Grossflugzeuge ("large aircraft") heavy tactical bomber, of which one still survives of the 320 built, as the sole surviving World War One German multi-engine bomber.

During the Second World War AEG produced machines for reconnaissance purposes, including a helicopter platform driven by an AC motor. This was a tethered craft that could not fly freely; the power supply was carried by three cables from the ground. The machine reached an altitude of 300 m.

=== Cars ===
AEG bought Kühlstein in 1902, founding the division Neue Automobil Gesellschaft (New Automobile Company), to make cars. AEG withdrew from car production in 1908.

Models produced include:

- AAG (1900 automobile)
- NAG Typ A
- NAG Typ B
- NAG Typ B2

=== Film projectors ===
AEG also produced for a long period a series of film projectors:

- Stillstandsmaschine 1919 Projektor 35 mm
- Theatermaschine 1920 Projektor 35 mm
- Triumphator I–III 1924–1935 Projektor 35 mm ACR 0710
- Successor (Lehrmeister) 1925–1935 Projektor 35 mm
- Kofferkino 1927 encased Projektor 35 mm
- Lehrmeister 1929 Projektor 35 mm ACR 0709 (Leitz)
- Mechau Modell 4 1929 – 1934 Projektor 35 mm
- Euro K 1938–42 Projektor 35 mm
- Euro M 1936 Projektor 35 mm
- Euro G 1938 Projektor 35 mm, Interlock-Version (G-MB)
- Euro M2 1939–1944 Projektor 35 mm

== Leadership ==
Name	From	To
Emil Rathenau	1887	1915
Felix Deutsch	1915	1928
Hermann Bücher	1928	January 1946
Walther Bernhard	January 1946	May 1947
Friedrich Spennrath	May 1947	December 1955
Hans Constantin Boden	January 1956	February 1961
Hugo Bäurle	March 1961	January 1962
Hans C. Boden	February 1962	September 1962
Hans Heyne	October 1962	December 1964
Berthold Gamer	January 1965	December 1965
Hans Bühler	January 1966	June 1970
Hans Groebe	June 1970	July 1976
Walter Cipa	July 1976	January 1980
Heinz Dürr	February 1980	December 1990
Ernst Stöckl	January 1991	September 1996

== The AEG brand today ==
As a result of the breakup and dissolution of the original company, Electrolux acquired the brand rights in 2005 and the name is also licensed to various companies: Currently the brand is being actively promoted by Electrolux; it includes many of the same products that it formerly manufactured, such as power solutions energy devices, telecommunication devices (phones and mobile phones), automation, car accessories, home appliances, power tools, projectors, printing equipment and supplies, water treatment devices, and personal care devices under the AEG brand.

- AEG Hausgeräte GmbH, simply known as AEG or AEG Electrolux – became part of Electrolux, produces white goods, such as washing machines, dishwashers, ovens, fridges etc.
- ITM Technology produces consumer electronics and telecommunication (mobile phone, home phone, etc.) equipment under the AEG name.
- Binatone manufactures mobile accessories, mobile phones, landline phones and two way radios under the AEG brand.
- AEG Elektrowerkzeuge (AEG Power Tools), licensed to Techtronic Industries (TTI) since 2009, produces hand power tools.
- AEG Haustechnik (licensed to Stiebel Eltron) produces home heating and climate control (humidifiers, airconditioners) products
- AEG Industrial engineering produces electrical power equipment, including generators up to 55MW, control gear and switchgear, electrical motors, transformers etc. as well as high power inverters and DC supplies for industrial use.
- AEG SVS Schweiss-Technik: manufacturer resistance welding machines and equipment
- AEG Gesellschaft fur moderne Informationssysteme mbH (AEG-MIS): Develops custom LCDs for information systems
- AEG ID: produces RFID tags and readers
- AEG Power Solutions (formerly Saft Power systems or AEG Power Supply Systems): produces uninterruptible/backup/stable power supply systems for electric supply sensitive equipment (e.g. computers)
- AEG Professional Printing Equipment and Supplies: Produces wide format printers, inks, and media products for printing, as well as photoconductor drums and toners for printing applications (e.g. laser printer/photocopier)
- AViTEQ Vibrationstechnik
- Lloyd Dynamowerke
- Lafert Group

=== Logos ===
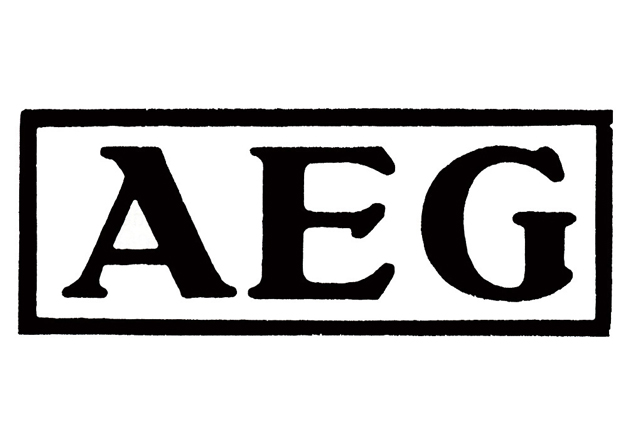
1919–1985

1985–2016

2016–present
