= Dompfeil =

German express train connection

Dompfeil is a name given in 1952 to an express train connection operated by Deutsche Bundesbahn (German Federal Rail) in route Cologne–Essen–Hamm–Hanover–Braunschweig and vice versa. While the name of the pair of trains remained the same, the route has been changed several times and in 1979 "Dompfeil" was put in service in route Dortmund–Wuppertal–Cologne–Mainz–Mannheim–Stuttgart–Munich. "Dompfeil" was one of the several trains of the so-called Blaues Netz or 'blue network' of express trains in Western Germany in the 1950s and 1960s.

The train operated with only three coaches, all 2nd class and with one of them being half restaurant. One of the coaches was nominally a split 1st-class and 2nd-class coach, but the train actually ran only as a 2nd-class service.
