= Aiways U6 ion =

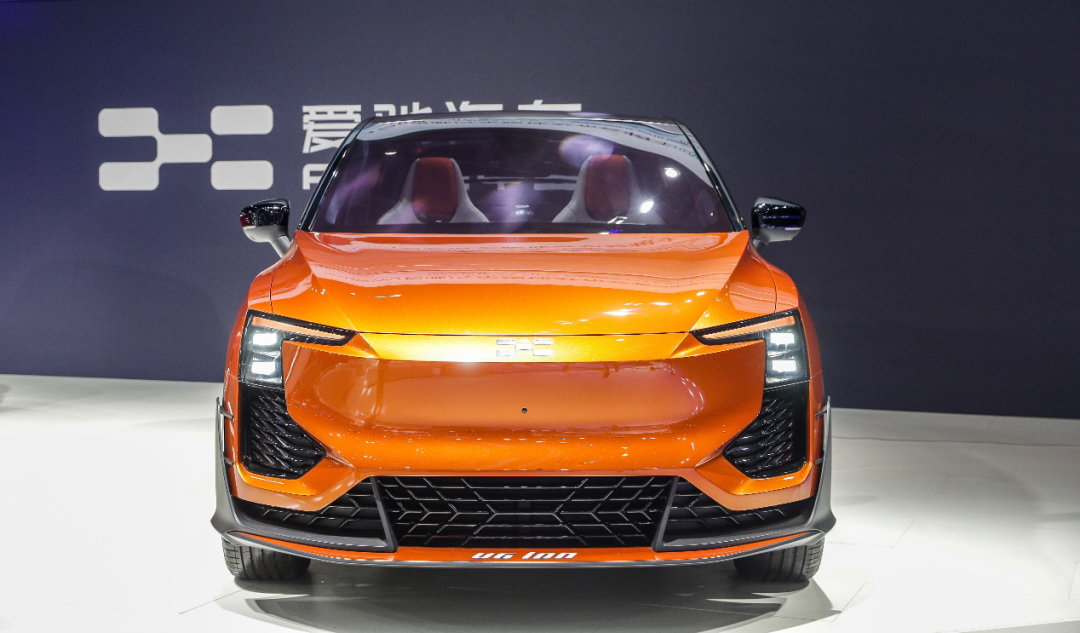

Overview
- Manufacturer: Aiways

Body and chassis
- Class: Crossover SUV
- Body style: 5-door SUV

The U6 ion is a concept car from Aiways, it was first shown at the Chengdu Auto Show in China in July 2020. The U6 ion was due to make its European debut at the Geneva Motor Show 2020, but this was cancelled due to the COVID-19 pandemic and the vehicle was launched at a virtual event on 3 March 2020.

The concept car was presented as a fully-electric intelligent coupe equipped with 21-inch alloy wheels, a domed glass roof, an integrated electric scooter and an on-board drone.

The production vehicle based on this concept is known as the U6 and went into pre-production in May 2021.
