= Motorenbau Werk Kassel =

Coordinates: 51.2971°N 9.5231°E

During World War II, the Motorenbau Werk Kassel (Engine Construction Factory Kassel – MWK) in Kassel was a branch factory of the Junkers Flugzeug- und Motorenwerke AG Dessau and supplier for strategic military technology among other things the first ready for serial production Turbostrahltriebwerk Jumo 004B (jet engine) of the world. In 1945, when the factory was occupied by the American troops, more than 5000 people worked there.

The machinery was dismantled and confiscated by the occupying powers. The factory, the only Junkers site in West Germany, was sold by the Hesse state government to AEG on 28 February 1950 for 4,096,543 deutschmarks.

== History ==
Originally the factory at Lilienthalstraße 150 in Kassel was a site of the Gerätebau GmbH, a subsidiary of the Brother Thiel Seebach. The founding of this subsidiary was part of the contract award from the Oberkommando des Heeres to Thiel on 16 February 1938, as well as the closing of a lease agreement between the property owner, the Verwertungsgesellschaft für Montanindustrie (short Montan), and the Gerätebau GmbH. This approach comply with the Montan-Schema.
