= Aiways U5 =

Battery electric compact crossover SUV

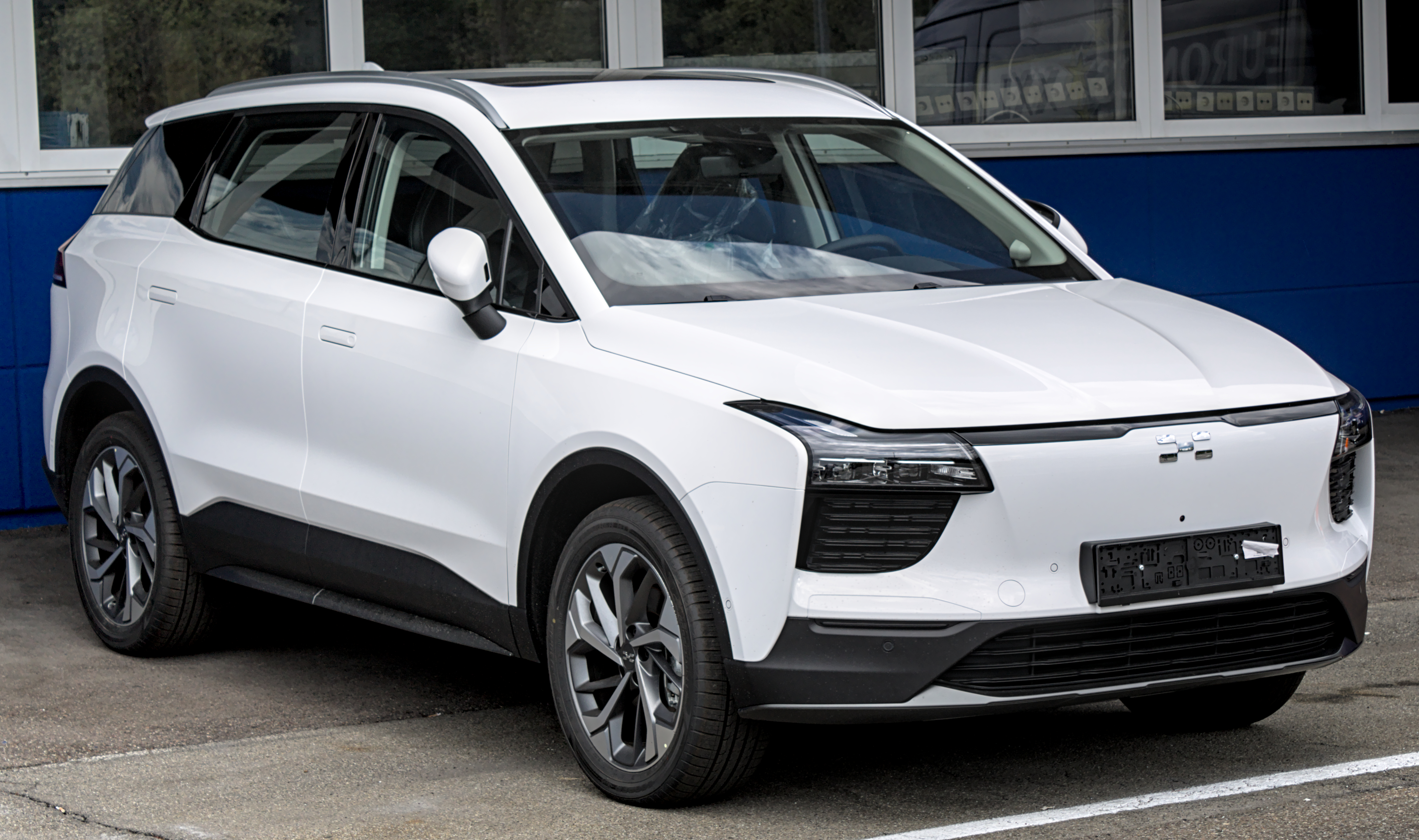

Overview
- Manufacturer: Aiways
- Production: 2019–2023
- Assembly: China: Shangrao, Jiangxi
- Designer: Ken Okuyama

Body and chassis
- Class: Compact crossover SUV
- Body style: 5-door SUV
- Layout: Front-motor, front-wheel-drive
- Platform: MAS
- Related: Aiways U6

Powertrain
- Electric motor: 150 kW (201 hp) Permanent-magnet synchronous
- Transmission: Single-speed
- Battery: 63 kWh Li-ion
- Electric range: 400–410 km (249–255 mi) (WLTP)

Dimensions
- Wheelbase: 2,800 mm (110.2 in)
- Length: 4,680 mm (184.3 in)
- Width: 1,865 mm (73.4 in)
- Height: 1,700 mm (66.9 in)
- Kerb weight: 1,720–1,770 kg (3,792–3,902 lb)

The Aiways U5 (Chinese: 爱驰U5; pinyin: Aì Chí U5) is a battery electric compact crossover SUV manufactured by the Chinese company Aiways. It is the first vehicle model from this manufacturer. The production model of the U5 was publicly unveiled at the 2018 Beijing Auto Show. The car was originally previewed as the Aiways U5 ion Concept in 2018.

== History ==
The Aiways U5 production model was publicly unveiled at the 2018 Beijing Auto Show. The car was originally previewed as the Aiways U5 ion Concept in 2018. The Aiways U5 was expected to have a starting price of 197,900 yuan to 292,100 yuan.

Aiways U5 is produced at the company's manufacturing facility just outside Shangrao, China.

== Design ==
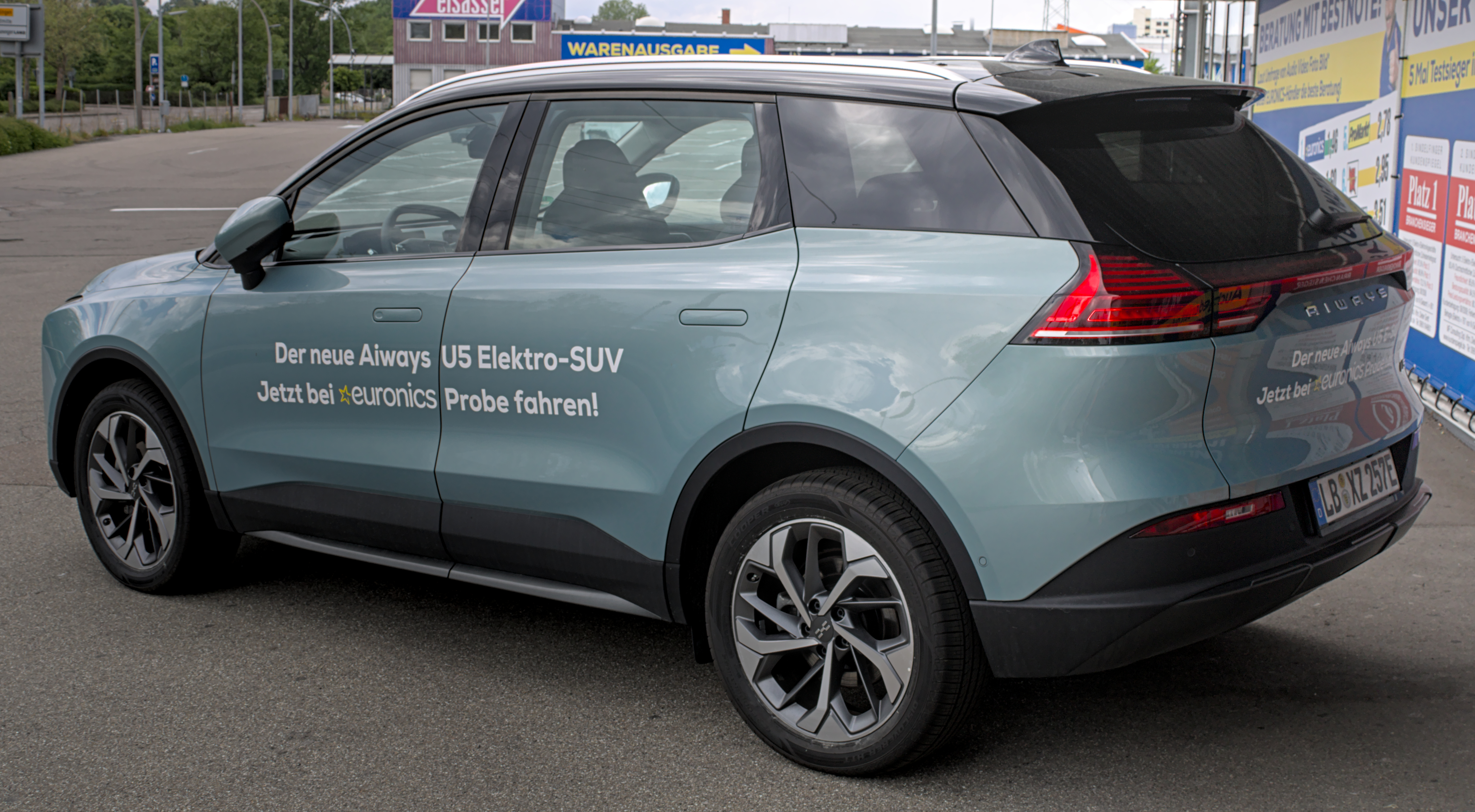
Rear view

The exterior styling of the U5 received an update in 2021 although the dimensions remained the same.

Aiways has previously referred to the design as a “connection between modern craftsmanship and technology for the future”. The U5 exterior design has optimized aerodynamics to give a drag coefficient of 0.29.

== Specifications ==
The Aiways U5 comes in Standard and Premium versions. It has a Macpherson front suspension system and multi-link rear suspension system.

The Aiways U5 has a large dashboard with a 12.3-inch tablet style screen to access the vehicle and infotainment systems. There is an 8-speaker audio system with DAB+ and traditional radio functionality.

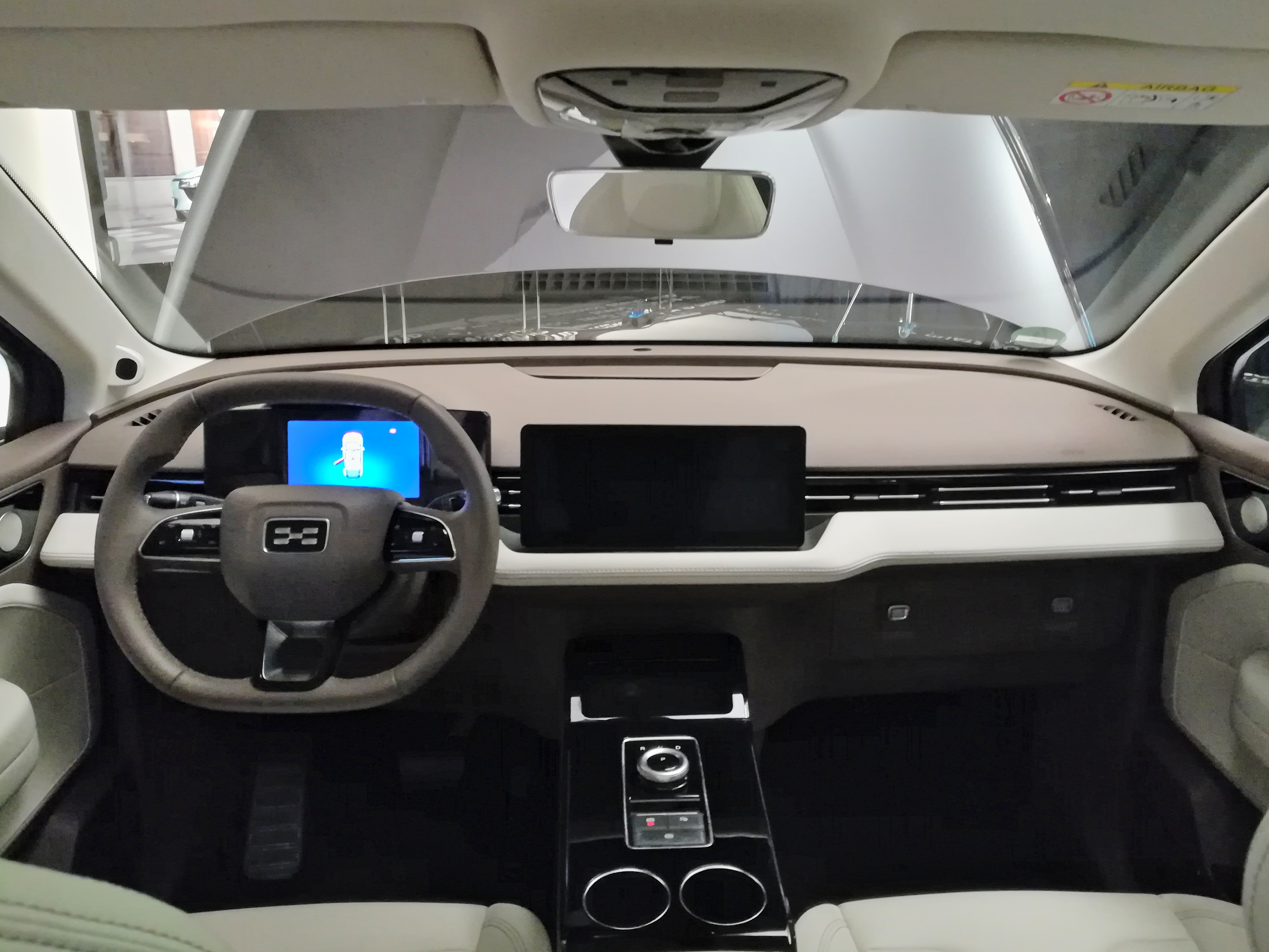
Interior

== Powertrain ==
The Aiways U5 has a 63 kWh battery unit and a range of 400 km (249 mi) (410 km (255 mi) in standard trim) according to the WLTP cycle. The battery can be charged from 20% to 80% in 35 minutes using a DC charger or 0% to 100% in 10 hours using a (6.6 kW Type 2) AC charger. The battery energy density stands at 172 Wh/kg.

Aiways has patented a ‘sandwich’ structure battery pack which is made up of 24 high energy density modules supplied by CATL. It has multiple layers which separate the wet (cooling plate) and dry (battery module) areas within the cell. This improves the heating and cooling in the cell and therefore increases capacity (63 kWh) and range. This structure is also theoretically safer in the event of a collision as the wet and dry areas cannot mix and cause a short circuit.

The battery pack is paired with a permanent-magnet synchronous electric motor delivering 150 kW (201 hp; 204 PS) of power and 310 Nm (230 lb⋅ft) of torque with a top speed of 16,000 rpm, which allows the U5 to accelerate from 0 to 100 km/h (62 mph) in 7.5 seconds in Standard trim.

== Safety ==
Euro NCAP test results* 5 door LHD SUV (2019)
Test	Points	%
Overall:	3 /5 stars	
Adult occupant:	28	73%
Child occupant:	34	70%
Pedestrian:	21.9	45%
Safety assist:	7.2	55%

=== Active safety ===
Aiways U5 comes with various advanced driver-assistance systems (ADAS) as standard including:

- Lane Keeping Assist (LKA) - Between 60 and 120 km/h (37 and 75 mph) the system warns the driver if they are about to stray from their lane and makes necessary adjustments to the steering if the driver does not. It also makes an audible warning if the driver's hands are off the steering wheel for more than eight seconds,
- Traffic Jam Assistant (TJA) remains active up to 120 km/h (75 mph) and automatically handles the cycles of acceleration, braking and restarting as seen during a traffic jam,
- Blind Spot Detection (BSD) system alerts the driver with a sound and a warning light when a vehicle or cyclist is passing alongside the Aiways U5,
- Rear Cross Traffic Alert (RCTA) also warns the driver when another vehicle passes at the rear of the car,
- Emergency Brake Assist (EBA) automatically applies the car's brakes when a pedestrian, cyclist or vehicle passes in front of the car,
- Forward Collision Warning (FCW) detects vehicles and pedestrians in front of the U5 and makes a warning sound if the vehicle approaches at a speed above 10 km/h (6 mph),
- Adaptive Cruise Control (ACC) maintains a safe space from the vehicle in front and brings the U5 to a halt when the traffic ahead stops,
- Intelligent High Beam Control (IHBC) automatically operates the vehicles high-beam headlights,
- Parking Assistant - automatically manoeuvres the vehicle into a parking space.

=== Passive safety ===
- Optimized airbag deployment,
- A collision-activated circuit breaker unlocks all doors, activates the hazard lights and shuts off power to all electrical circuits in the event of a collision.

== Markets ==
=== Europe ===
In January 2020, the U5 was planned to be made available to the left-hand-drive European market in April 2020.

As of December 2020, the vehicle is available in the Netherlands and Belgium and shows up in the vehicle registration statistics for both countries. In the Netherlands, the price starts from €39,950.

The Aiways U5 is also available in Germany and France.

As of May 2021 it is available in Denmark.

=== Thailand ===
The Aiways Thailand (Aiways and Phoenix EV joint venture) plans to produce Aiways U5 in Thailand by 2023.

== Sales ==
Year	China
2020	2,600
2021	3,011
2022	4,540
2023	521
2024	—
