= Aiways U7 ion =

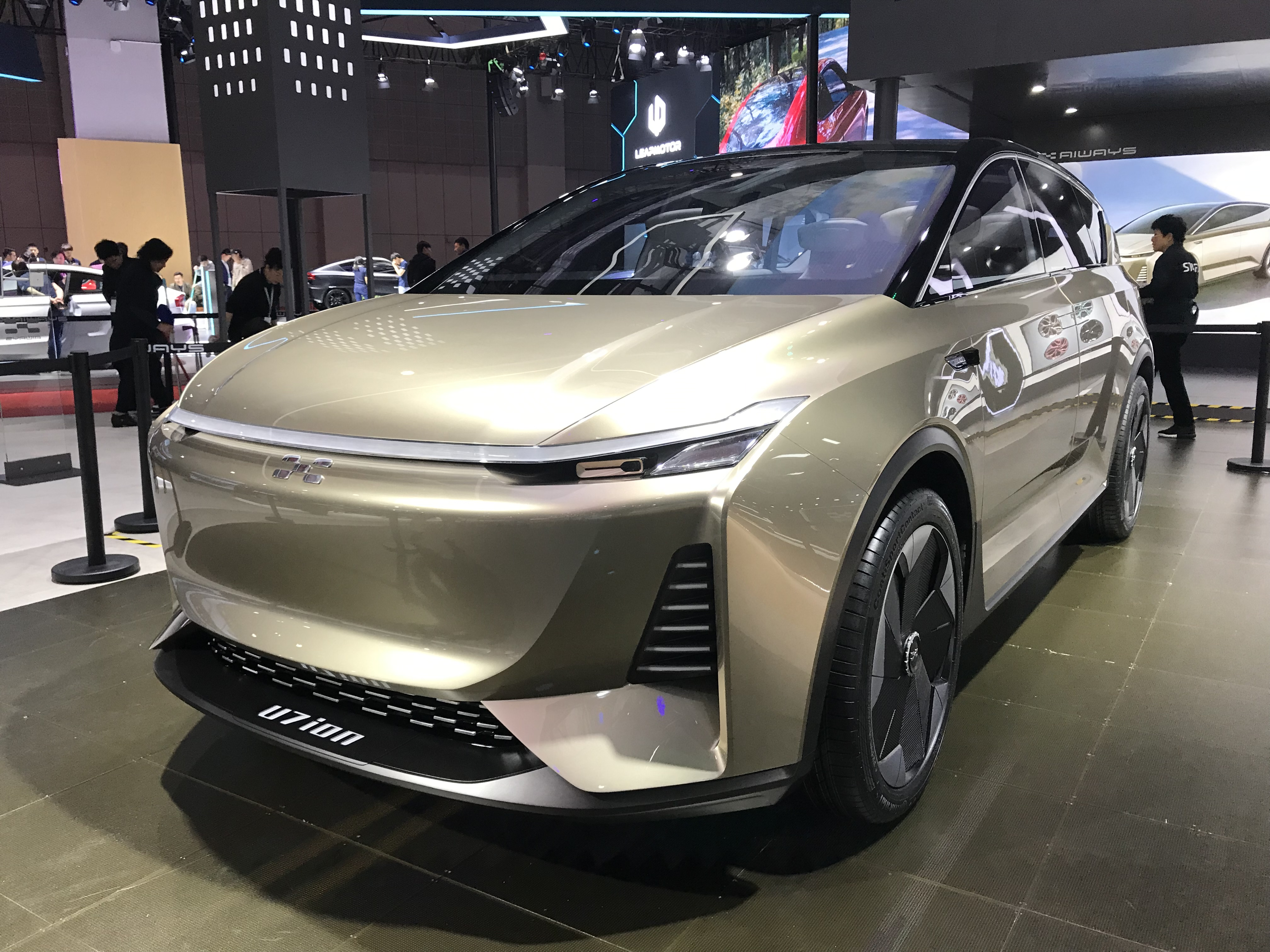
- Aiways U7 ion Concept at Auto Shanghai 2019

Overview
- Manufacturer: Aiways

Body and chassis
- Class: Crossover SUV
- Body style: 5-door SUV

The U7 ion is a concept car from the Chinese start up Aiways which was first shown at the Shanghai Auto Show in 2019.

It was used to demonstrate Aiways’ artificial intelligence (AI) and advanced driver assistance systems (ADAS) and included a self-learning robot with voice recognition capabilities that could move around the car's interior via a roof rail and offer the passengers assistance. The concept car also offered a mobile console with touchscreen which could be moved around the cabin, refrigerator, air purifier and heated and cooled cup holders.

Aiways have not yet announced plans to put the U7 ion into production.
