= Deutsche Bundesbahn =

State railway of the Federal Republic of Germany (1949–1994)

- "DB-Keks" logo used from 1949 to 1994
- Industry: Rail transport company
- Predecessor: Deutsche Reichsbahn
- Founded: 7 September 1949; 76 years ago
- Defunct: 1 January 1994; 32 years ago
- Fate: Merged with Deutsche Reichsbahn (East Germany)
- Successor: Deutsche Bahn
- Headquarters: Frankfurt, West Germany
- Area served: West Germany (1949–1990); Germany (1990–1994)

Deutsche Bundesbahn (German pronunciation: [ˈdɔʏtʃə ˈbʊndəsˌbaːn], lit. 'German Federal Railway'), or DB ([deːˈbeː]), was formed as the state railway of the newly established West Germany (FRG) on 7 September 1949 as a successor of the Deutsche Reichsbahn-Gesellschaft (DRG). The DB remained the state railway of West Germany until after German reunification, when it was merged with the former East German Deutsche Reichsbahn (DR) to form Deutsche Bahn, which came into existence on 1 January 1994.

== Background ==
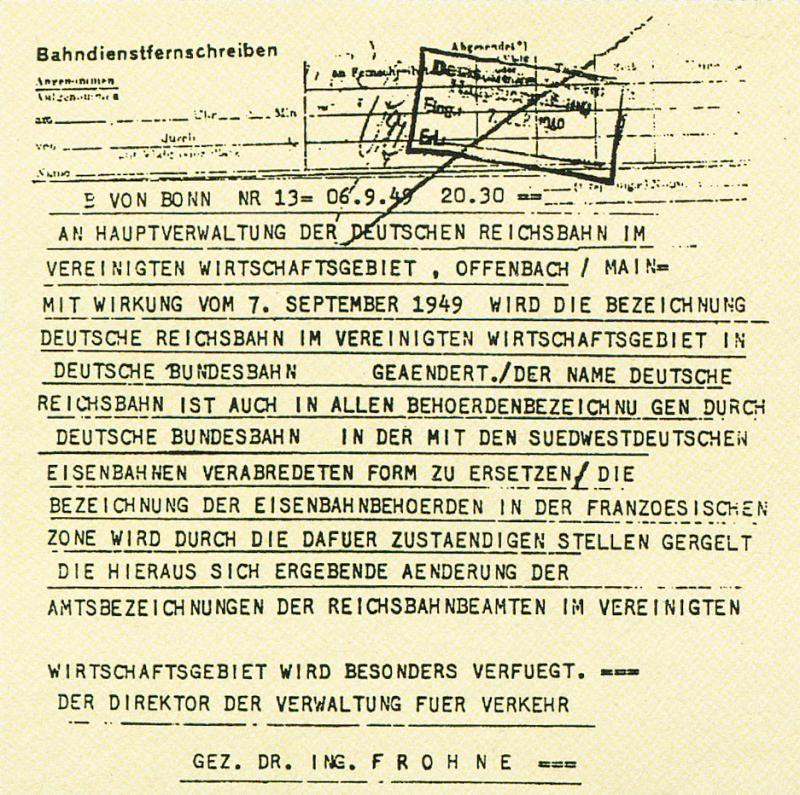
Telegram announcing the formation of the Deutsche Bundesbahn

After World War II, each of the military governments of the Allied Occupation Zones in Germany were de facto in charge of the German railways in their respective territories. On 10 October 1946, the railways in the British and American occupation zones formed the Deutsche Reichsbahn im Vereinigten Wirtschaftsgebiet (German Imperial Railway in the united economic area), while on 25 June 1947, the provinces under French occupation formed the Südwestdeutsche Eisenbahn. With the formation of the FRG these successor organisations of the DRG were reunited, a situation codified by the Federal Railways Law (Bundesbahngesetz) that was ratified on 13 December 1951. The railways in the Saarland joined on 1 January 1957.

== Organisation ==
The DB was a state-owned company that, with few local exceptions, exercised a monopoly concerning rail transport throughout West Germany. The DB was placed under the control of the Bundesverkehrsministerium (Federal Transport Ministry). With its headquarters in Frankfurt, in 1985 the DB was the third-largest employer in West Germany, with a strength of 322,383 employees. A special transit police (Bahnpolizei) provided security. The catering needs of the DB were supplied by the “Deutsche Schlafwagen- und Speisewagengesellschaft” (DSG), later “Deutsche Service-Gesellschaft der Bahn”, as the former DRG caterer Mitropa was situated in East Germany and serviced the Deutsche Reichsbahn in the GDR.

As West Berlin lay surrounded by the GDR, local and long-distance railway services in the divided city were provided exclusively by the DR, although the DB operated a ticket office in the Hardenbergstraße near the main West Berlin passenger station Zoologischer Garten.

== 1949–1970 ==
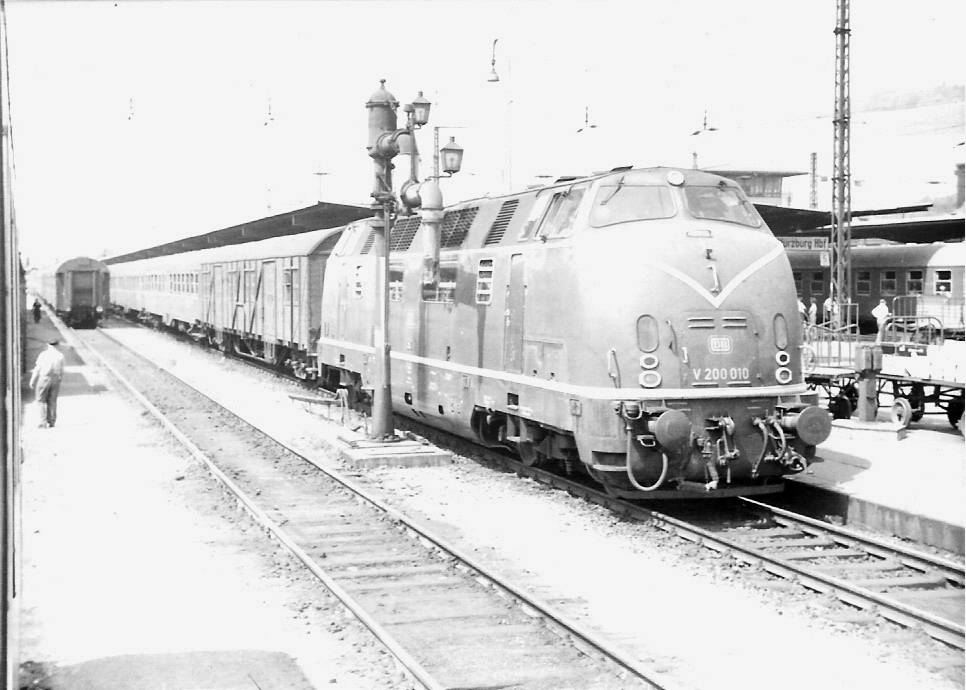
V200 number 010 pulling passenger train in West Germany, c. 1961

The immediate tasks in the early years after the end of World War II involved the reconstruction of the heavily damaged infrastructure and the replenishment of locomotives and rolling stock. Contrary to the Deutsche Reichsbahn in the GDR, the DB was not subject to reparations and benefited from the influx of capital through the Marshall Plan. During the early years, new steam engines were constructed and placed into service. The last new steam locomotive type was the Class 10, which entered service in 1957. Only two units of class 10 were built. In 1959 DB took the last steam locomotive delivery when the last of the class 23 locomotives was delivered. Soon, with increase in mass motorization, the railway started to lose passenger volume. As a result, rail buses were introduced on some lines, while other smaller volume lines were closed. Main lines became increasingly electrified. The later years of this epoch saw a decrease and eventual phasing out of steam engines, with the last one to cease regular service in 1977. Traction was provided increasingly by diesel and electric engines. With increased use of diesel and electric locomotives, progress was made in decreasing travel time for passengers. New types of passenger trains were introduced such as the Trans Europ Express and the InterCity.

Transport of goods also had to compete with the ever-increasing competition from trucks. Furthermore, traditional services such as coal and iron ore shipments declined with the changes in the overall economy.

== 1970–1993 ==
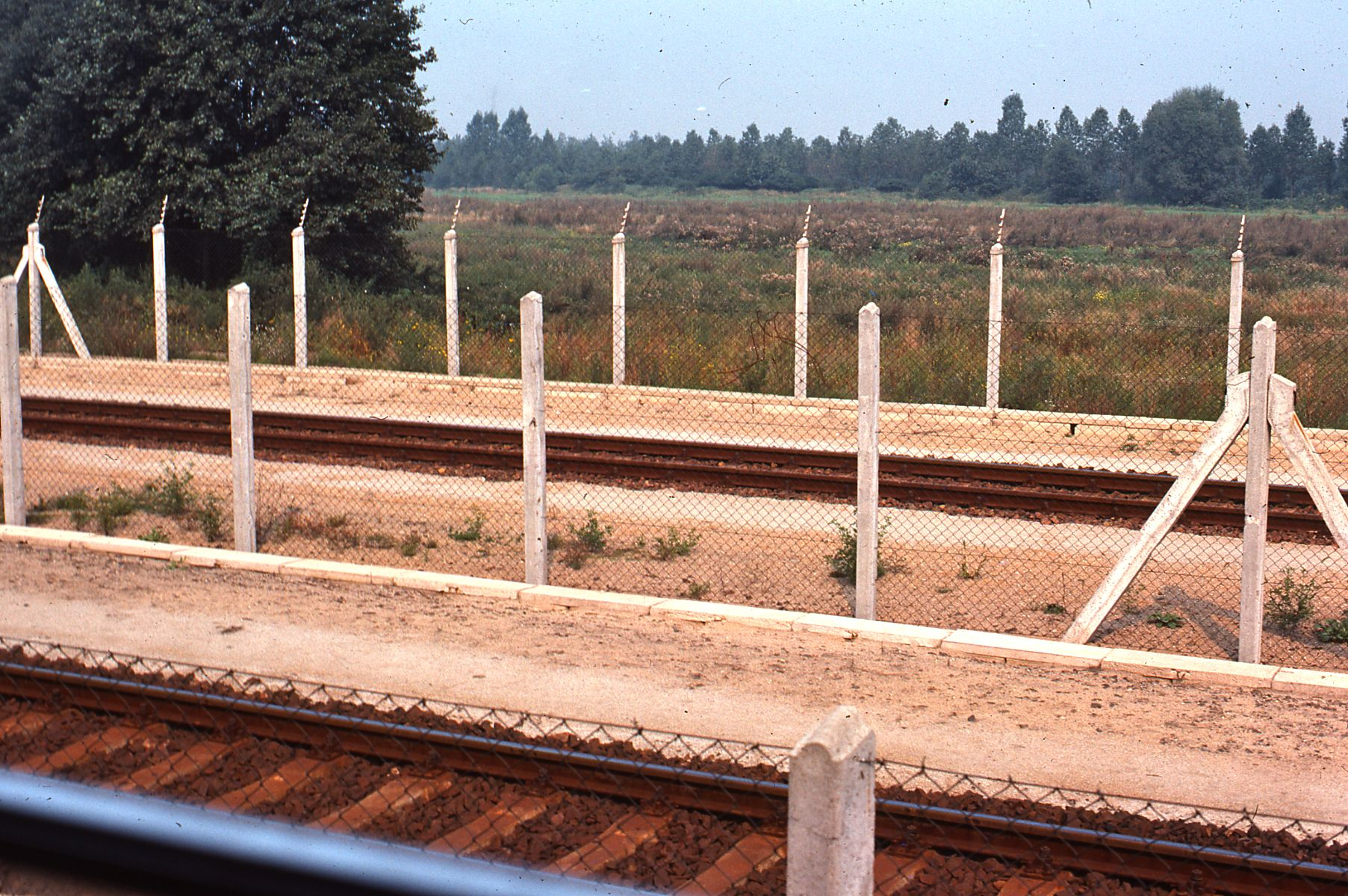
West German trains ran through East Germany. This 1977 view shows how barriers were made near the tracks to keep people away.

After the introduction of the TGV in France, the ICE system of high speed passenger trains was developed. Significant stretches of new high speed track, like the Hanover-Würzburg high-speed rail line, had to be laid or upgraded. Other characteristics of this epoch are the introduction of computer systems and the steps taken towards an integrated system of European railways. Externally, rolling stock displayed more colourful and varied livery schemes.

The two German states were reunified in October 1990 with both DB and DR now being special funds of the German Federal government. Article 26 of the Unification Treaty (Einigungsvertrag) stipulated the DR to be merged with DB at the earliest opportunity. The DB, in the interim, initiated new coordinations in businesses with the DR, started IC and ICE services into Berlin, and extended IC and ICE services to major cities in eastern Germany. Administratively, on 1 June 1992 the DB and DR formed a joint board of directors which governed both entities. However, the merger was delayed over the structure of merged railway due to concerns by German politicians on the ever-increasing annual operating deficits incurred by the DB and DR. After several years of delays, the Bundesverkehrsministerium proposed a comprehensive reform of the German railway system (Bahnreform), which was approved by the Bundestag in 1993 and went into effect on 1 January 1994. At the heart of the reform package was a) the merger of the DB and the DR and b) the change of the form of the enterprise into a stock corporation. Nevertheless, the Deutsche Bahn was still publicly owned.

== Presidents of the DB ==
- Heinz Maria Oeftering, 13 May 1957 – 12 May 1972
- Wolfgang Vaerst, 13 May 1972 – 12 May 1982
- Reiner Gohlke, 13 May 1982 – 18 June 1990
- Heinz Dürr, 1 January 1991 – 1 January 1994 (thereafter the head of newly formed Deutsche Bahn AG).

== See also ==
- Locomotive classification of the Deutsche Bundesbahn
- List of DB locomotives and railbuses
- Deutsche Bahn
- Dompfeil
