= Aiways U6 =

Battery electric compact crossover SUV

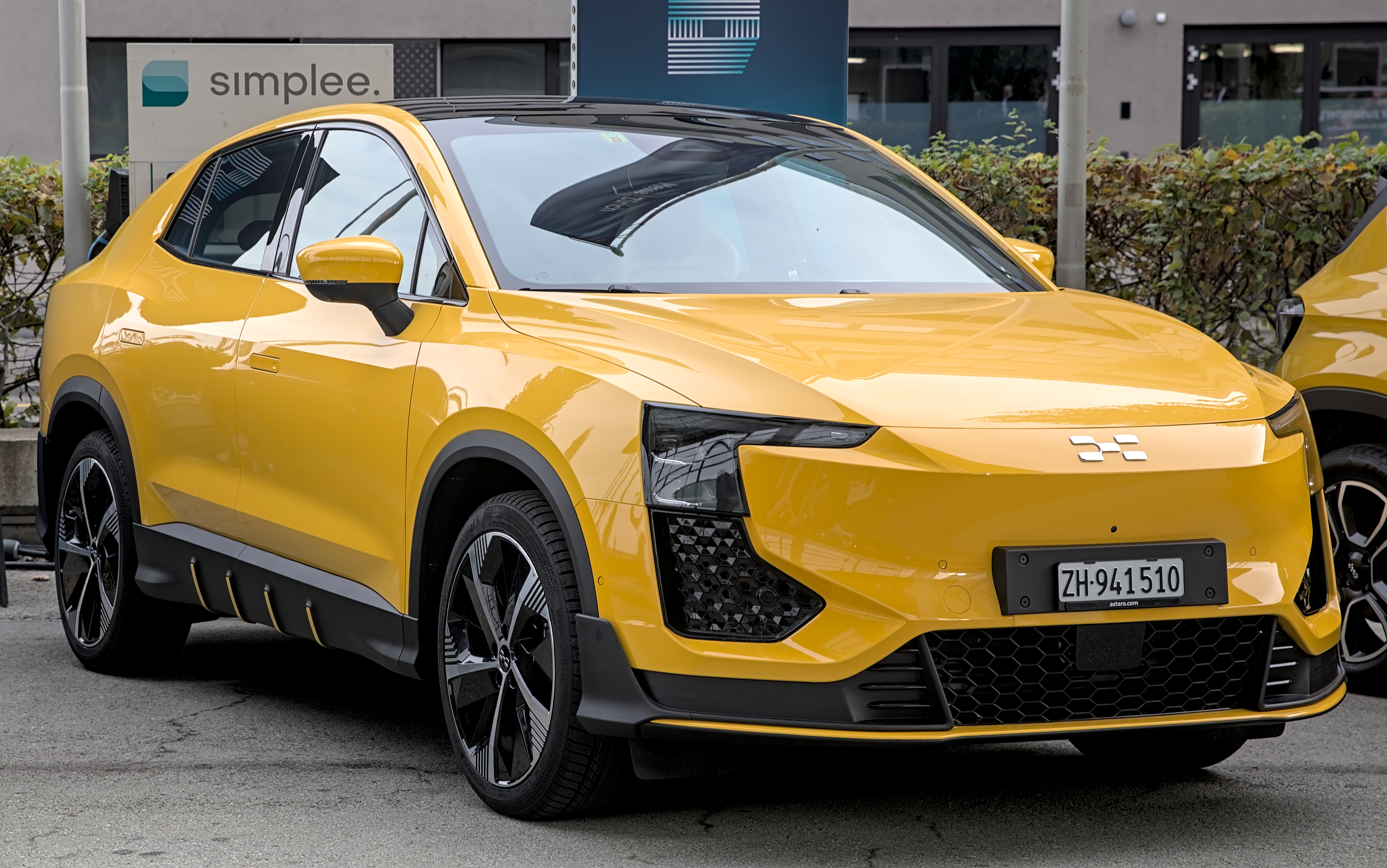

Overview
- Manufacturer: Aiways
- Production: 2021–2023
- Assembly: China: Shangrao, Jiangxi
- Designer: Ken Okuyama

Body and chassis
- Class: Compact crossover SUV
- Body style: 5-door coupe SUV
- Layout: Front-motor, front-wheel-drive
- Platform: MAS
- Related: Aiways U5

Powertrain
- Electric motor: 150 kW (201 hp) Permanent-magnet synchronous motor
- Transmission: Single speed
- Battery: 63 kWh Li-ion

Dimensions
- Wheelbase: 2,800 mm (110.2 in)
- Length: 4,805 mm (189.2 in)
- Width: 1,880 mm (74.0 in)
- Height: 1,641 mm (64.6 in)
- Kerb weight: 1,790–2,195 kg (3,946–4,839 lb)

The Aiways U6 (Chinese: 爱驰U6; pinyin: Aì Chí U6) is a battery electric compact crossover SUV manufactured by the Chinese company Aiways.

== Overview ==
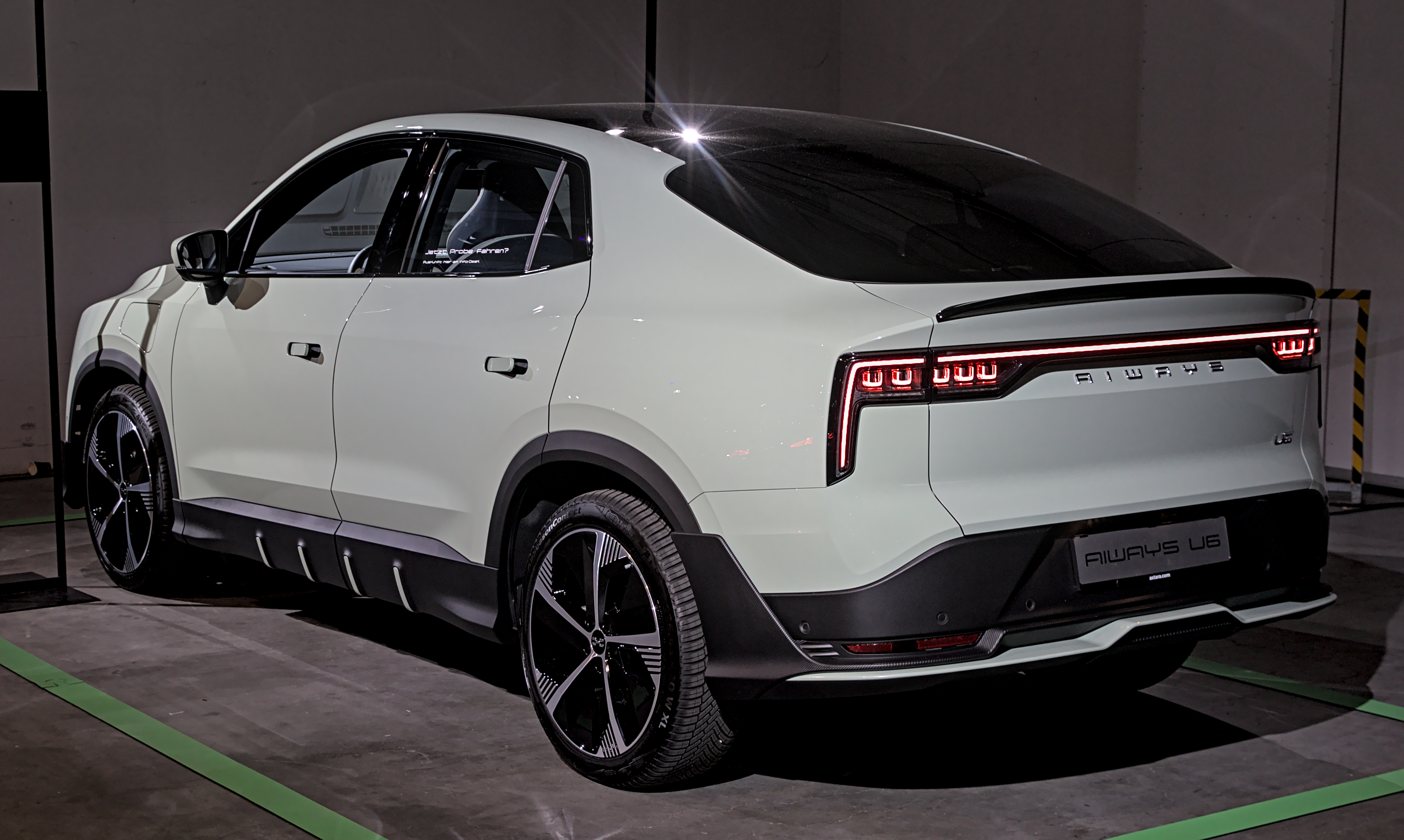
Rear view

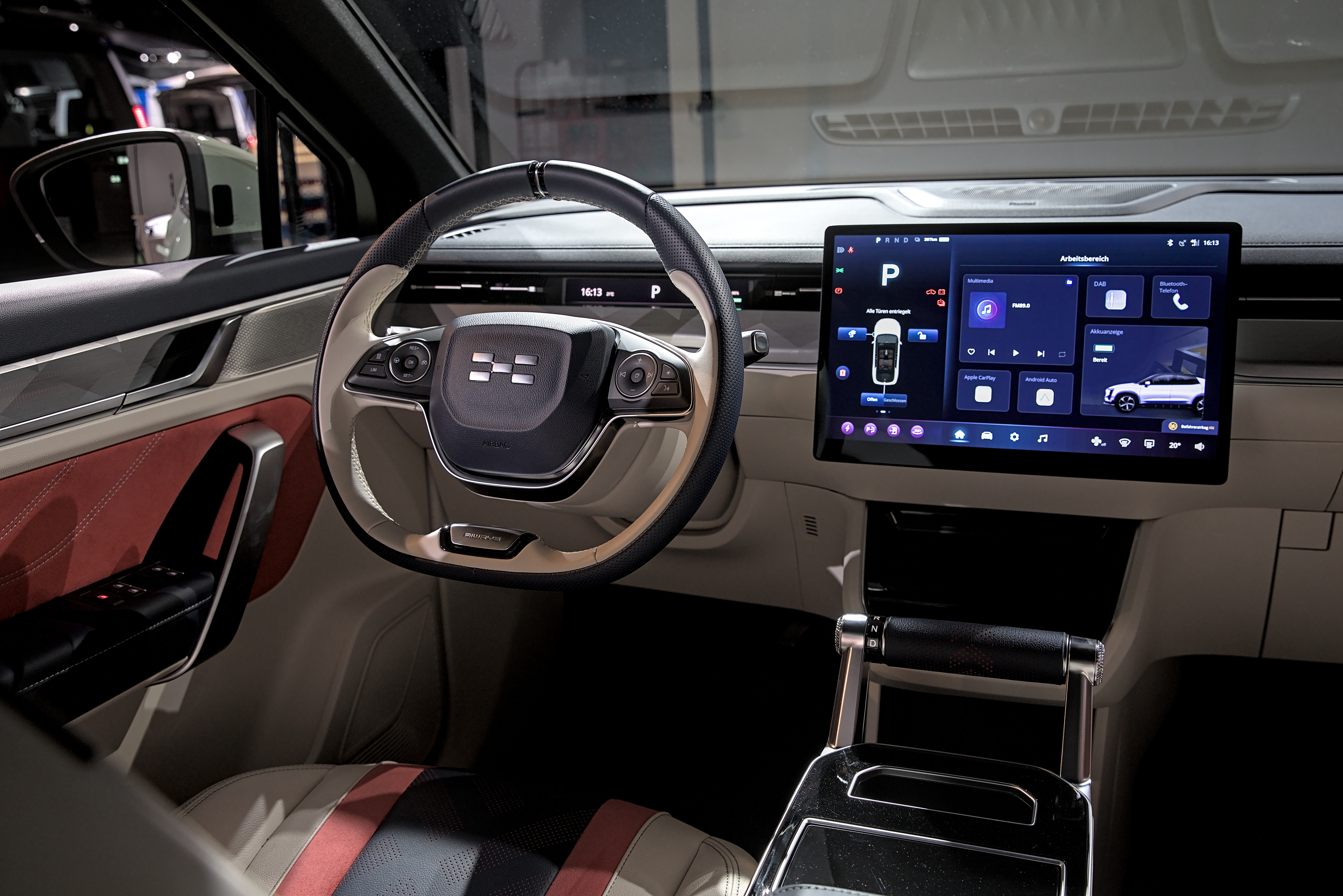
Interior

The U6 will be the second all-electric model produced by Chinese start up, Aiways. It is based on the U6 ion concept first shown at the Chengdu Auto Show in China in July 2020, and went into pre-production at Aiways’ Shangrao plant in May 2021.

The U6 will be produced at Aiways’ Shangrao plant, China. The pre-production phase began in May 2021. Mass production for the Chinese market and delivery is planned in 2021. Production for European models will begin later in 2021, and market launch in Europe will be early 2022.

The production version of Aiways U6 keeps the domed glass panoramic roof of the U6 ion concept car. It is styled to be sportier in appearance than the other Aiways model, the U5. It is the second Aiways vehicle to be built on the company's More Adaptable Structure (MAS) platform and will offer features such as remote parking assist which allows the driver to use their smartphone to park the U6 from up to 10 meters away.

New Aiways U6 are expected to be offered with the same warranty and maintenance experience as the U5 which comes with a five-year or 150,000 km (93,206 mi) manufacturer warranty.

Aftersales and servicing in Europe is also expected to be provided by in-country partners.

== Markets ==
=== Thailand ===
The Aiways Thailand (Aiways and Phoenix EV joint venture) plans to produce Aiways U6 in Thailand by 2023.
