= AEG helicopter =

General information
- Type: Tethered observation helicopter
- National origin: Germany
- Manufacturer: AEG
- Status: Concept
- Number built: 1

The AEG helicopter was an unusual German aircraft project, intended to create a portable observation post in the form of a tethered helicopter. It achieved lift by use of two contra-rotating rotors powered by an electric motor that was supplied with power from the ground. The device could be folded for transportation on the back of a truck. An observer's cabin was suspended underneath the rotor assembly, and could be blown clear by an explosive charge in case of emergency. Development commenced in 1933, but it was never put into service by the military.

The system was tested with an up to 800 metre long Very Low Frequency antenna for communication with submerged submarines. The three power feeder cables doubled as radiators for frequencies from 15 to 60 kHz.

== Specifications (AEG helicopter) ==
Data from Nowarra

General characteristics

- Crew: 1
- Max takeoff weight: 1,225 kg (2,701 lb)
- Powerplant: 1 × AEG Electric motor, 150 kW (200 hp)
- Main rotor diameter: 2 × 7.92 m (26 ft 0 in)
- Main rotor area: 98.5 m^{2} (1,060 sq ft) Contra-rotating

Performance

- Service ceiling: 1,000 m (3,300 ft)

== See also ==
Aircraft of comparable role, configuration, and era

- Petróczy-Kármán-Žurovec PKZ-2

Related lists

- List of military aircraft of Germany

== Bibliography ==
- Nowarra, Heinz J.. Die Deutsche Luftrüstung 1933-1945 - Vol.1 - AEG-Dornier. Bernard & Graefe Verlag. 1993. Koblenz. ISBN 3-7637-5464-4 (Gesamtwerk), ISBN 3-7637-5465-2 (Band 1)
- Helmut Maier. Rüstungsforschung im Nationalsozialismus: Organisation, Mobilisierung und Entgrenzung der Technikwissenschaften. Wallstein Verlag. 2002. Page 134.
