= Dürr Group =

German engineering firm

Dürr AG
- Type: Aktiengesellschaft
- Traded as: FWB: DUE; SDAX
- Industry: Plant and machinery construction
- Founded: 1896; 130 years ago
- Founder: Paul Dürr
- Headquarters: Stuttgart, Germany
- Area served: Worldwide
- Key people: Jochen Weyrauch, Alexandra Dambeck, Lars Friedrich, Daniel Schmitt, Gerhard Federer, Chairman of the Supervisory Board
- Revenue: 4.2 billion Euro (2025)
- Number of employees: 18,000 (2025)
- Website: www.durr-group.com

Dürr AG is a global mechanical and plant engineering firm. The company, founded by Paul Dürr (1871–1936) as a metal shop for roof flashing in Bad Cannstatt in 1895, has been listed on the Frankfurt Stock Exchange since 4 January 1990. Meanwhile, the shares are listed in the MDAX and Stoxx 600. The customers of Dürr AG include almost all familiar automobile manufacturers and their suppliers. Other market segments include, for example, the mechanical engineering, chemical and pharmaceutical industries and – since the takeover of HOMAG Group AG in October 2014 – the woodworking industry. The company is registered in Stuttgart, but its actual location (mailing address) has been in Bietigheim-Bissingen since 1 August 2009 after the relocation of various business units.

== Company history ==
In 1896, a metal shop for roof flashing was founded in Bad Cannstatt by Paul Dürr. In 1917, the company expanded to sheet metal processing. In 1932, Paul Dürr handed the running of the company over to his son, Otto Dürr, who established a construction office.

With the rise of the National Socialists in 1936, the economic policy of the National Socialists focuses on self-reliance and rearmament. This initially leads to a perceptible upswing for German industry. It is not long before Dürr’s order books also look healthy again. While a modern production site is established in Stuttgart-Zuffenhausen, a workshop for apprentices is set up in Cannstatt, since the company is training more and more new recruits. It was also during this period that Dürr first hired engineers and began performing internal design work. With the invasion of Poland by the German army triggering the Second World War on September 1, 1939. Dürr became part of the Nazi arms industry and delivers, among other things, sheet metal parts for military vehicles. During the war, the company also uses forced laborers. Company History

Plant construction began in 1950 with the first system for chemical surface treatment. In 1963, Dürr installed the first equipment for electrophoretic dip-painting in the Ford factory in Genk, Belgium. In 1964 and 1966, subsidiaries were founded in Brazil and Mexico.

In 1978, Dürr expanded into the fields of automation and conveyor systems. Dürr launches its IPO and takes over the Behr-Group. So that all core capabilities for paint shop construction are now combined within one company. Dürr took over the French competitor Alstom Automation in 1999. The measuring systems group Carl Schenck AG also became part of the Dürr Group in 2000. In 2003, Dürr acquired the largest order in the company's history: General Motors ordered three paint shops in North America. In the summer of 2009, Dürr relocated its headquarter to the Bietigheim-Bissingen location.

In 2011 Dürr is expanding activities in the energy efficiency business area. In addition to exhaust air purification systems, that includes processes for utilizing energy recovered from industrial waste heat.

After 23 years at the top of the supervisory board of Dürr AG, Heinz Dürr retired from office in April 2013. Klaus Eberhardt was elected as his successor by the supervisory board, having been a member of the control body since 2012.

2014 Dürr acquired the majority of HOMAG Group AG, the world market leader for woodworking machines.

Dürr is represented in 32 countries at 124 business locations.

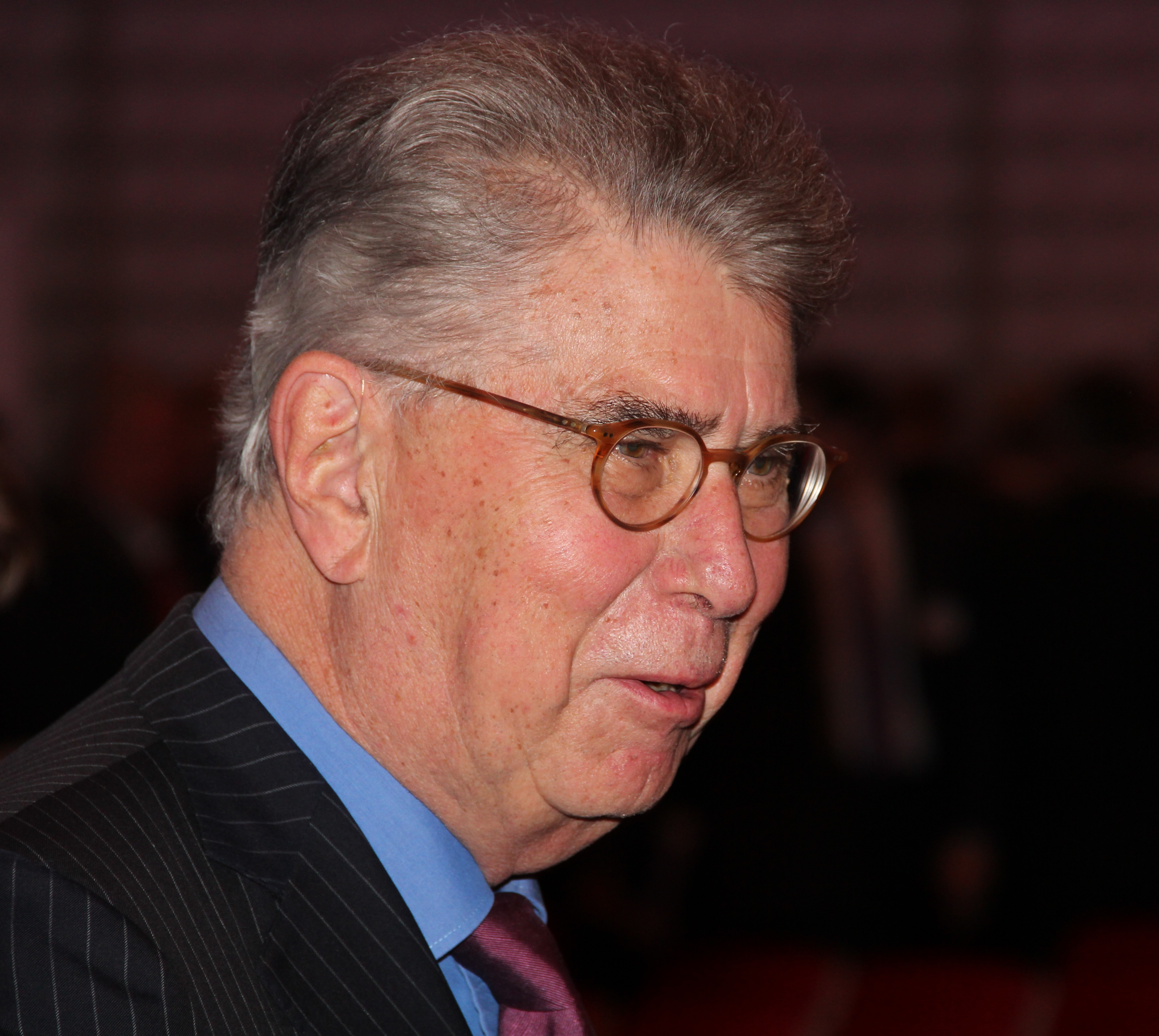
Heinz Dürr 2013

== Shareholder structure ==
Stake	Shareholder
26.2 %	Heinz Dürr GmbH, Berlin
70.3%	Institutional and private investors
3.5 %	Heinz und Heide Dürr Stiftung, Berlin

Last change: 04/21/2022

== Divisions ==
- Automotive: painting technology, final assembly, testing and filling technology as well as coating systems for battery electrodes
- Industrial Automation: assembly and test systems for automotive components, medical devices, and consumer goods as well as balancing technology solutions
- Woodworking: machinery and equipment for the woodworking industry
