= Barclay Curle =

British shipbuilding company

Seawind Barclay Curle
- Company type: Private
- Industry: Shipbuilding
- Founded: 1818, Glasgow
- Headquarters: Plymouth, Devon, England
- Products: Naval ships Merchant ships marine engines
- Parent: Swan Hunter (1912-1977)
- Website: www.seawindmarine.com

Seawind Barclay Curle is a British shipbuilding company.

== History ==
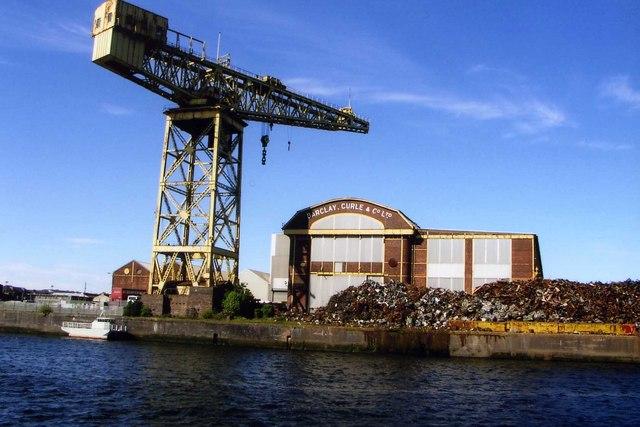
The former North British Diesel Engine Works and disused Titan Crane at Barclay Curle's Clydeholm Yard in Whiteinch.

The company was founded by Robert Barclay at Stobcross in Glasgow, Scotland during 1818. In 1862, the company built a large engineering works at Stobcross in Glasgow. In 1876, the company moved their yard down the river to Whiteinch. It was incorporated in 1884 as Barclay Curle. In 1912, Barclay Curle acquired the nearby Elderslie Shipyard in Scotstoun from John Shearer & Sons, to take the excess orders that the firm's existing Clydeholm yard in Whiteinch could not handle. Barclay Curle itself was acquired in 1912 by Swan Hunter.

On 11 November 1911 they launched from the Clydeholm yard MS Jutlandia for the Danish merchant fleet, the first British-built oil-engined vessel designed for ocean service.

In 1913, the North British Diesel Engine Works was built at the company's Clydeholm Shipyard in Whiteinch, a seminal modernist building designed by Karl Bernhard and supervised by John Galt that was influenced by Peter Behrens' 1909 AEG turbine factory in Berlin and continues to stand today. In 1920 a large Titan Crane was constructed on the quayside adjacent to the engine works at the Clydehom Yard by Sir William Arrol & Co. to enable transfer of engines for fitting out of ships berthed alongside. It remains one of four examples to remain on the River Clyde, along with those at Finnieston, Clydebank and Greenock.

During the First World War the Barclay Curle yard built several Insect-class gunboats for the Royal Navy.

The Swan Hunter owned Barclay Curle ceased building ships in its Clydeholm Shipyard at Whiteinch, Glasgow in 1968, focusing its operations on its Tyneside yards. The Elderslie Dockyard, which lay further west on the other side of Scotstoun and operated by Barclay Curle, was acquired by Yarrow Shipbuilders in 1974. The North British Diesel Engine Works continued and was purchased by the marine engineering company Sulzer until it was nationalised as part of British Shipbuilders under the Aircraft and Shipbuilding Industries Act 1977 and transferred production to naval weapon systems by British Aerospace (Sea Dart and Sea Wolf missiles) in the late 1970s, finally becoming an industrial estate in the mid-1980s.

As part of the Seawind Group, the company is no longer based in Glasgow but retains ship repair facilities in Birkenhead, Merseyside, and at Appledore, Devon.

The company records of the Barclay Curle company are held by Glasgow City Archives.
