= Barclay Curle Crane =

Coordinates: 55°52′21″N 4°20′44″W

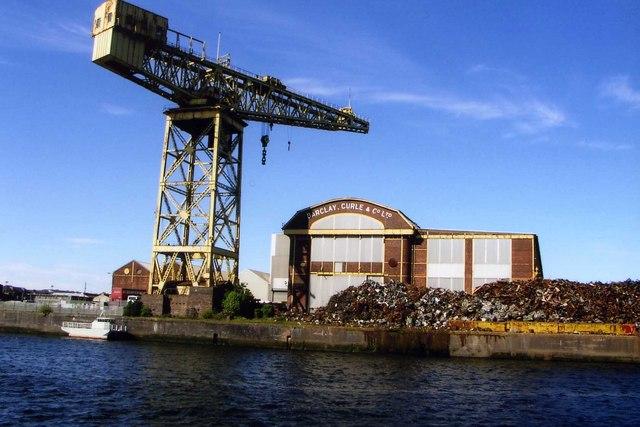
The Barclay Curle Crane

The Barclay Curle Crane is a disused Titan or giant cantilever crane at the Barclay Curle shipyard at Whiteinch, Glasgow, Scotland.

== History ==
It was built by Sir William Arrol & Co. in 1920. It is category A listed, and one of four such cranes remaining on the River Clyde.

== Design ==
The crane was rated at 150 tonnes (150 long tons; 170 short tons).

== See also ==
- List of Category A listed buildings in Glasgow
- List of listed buildings in Glasgow/7
