= Klara Franke =

Berlin 20th century social activist

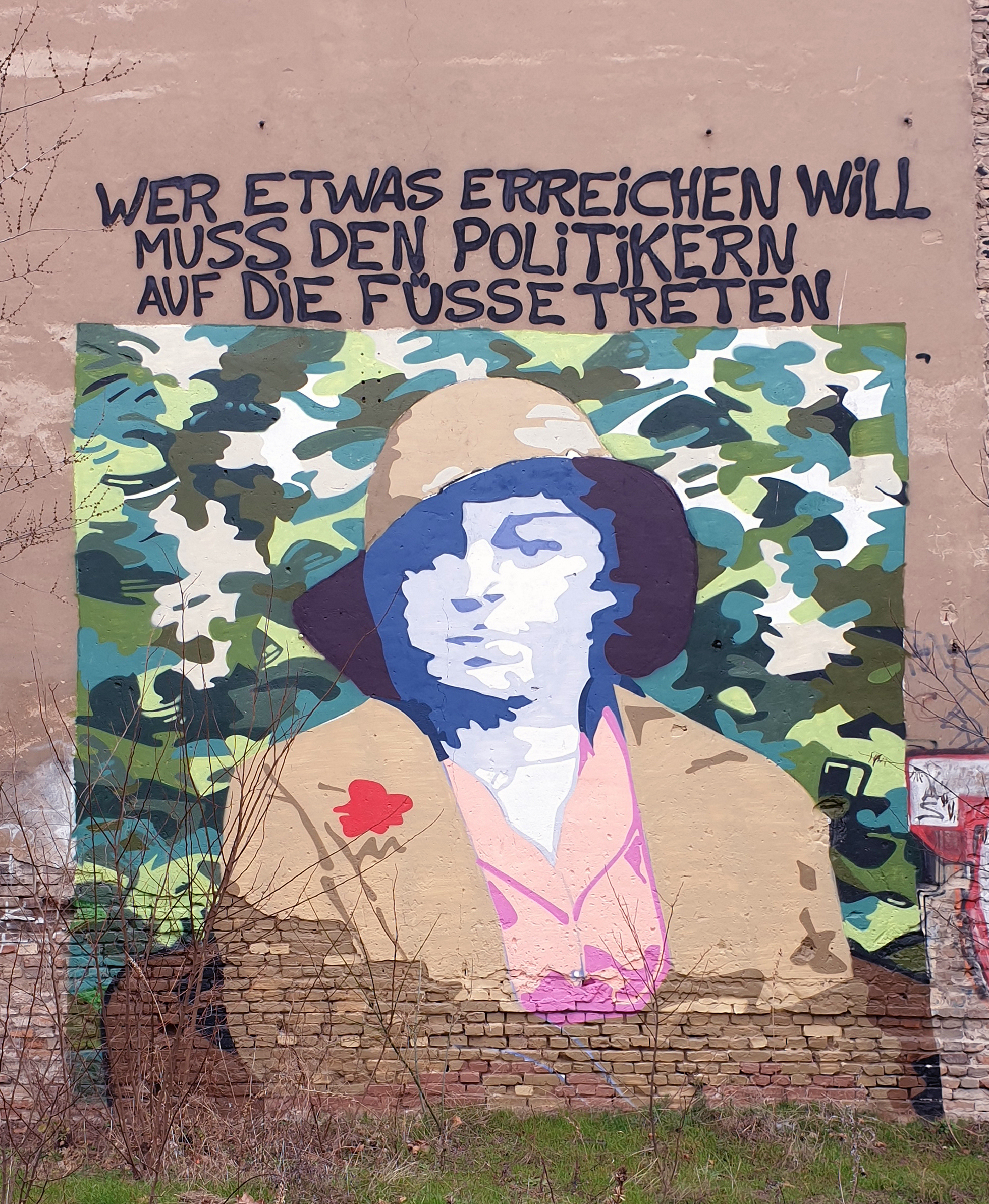
Mural by Christian Kurt Ebert of Klara Franke „Wer etwas erreichen will..“

Klara Franke (6 March 1911 – 26 August 1995) was a German local activist in Berlin. In the Berlin district of Moabit she was particularly committed to the development of the Lehrter Kiez. A memorial plaque commemorates her as the "Neighborhood Mother of Lehrter Street," who strove vigorously her entire life for the preservation and further development of the Moabit district of Berlin.

Klara-Franke-Straße and Klara-Franke-Platz, both in the 2017 built Mittemang quarter on the east side of the Lehrter Strasse are named after her. The Klara Franke Prize for Civic Engagement in Moabit is awarded every two years by the city borough coordination, District Moabit West.

Franke was born in 1911 in Borsingstraße in the Berlin-Mitte district. From 1912 to 1914, she lived with her parents in the town house at 54 Lehrter Straße in Moabit. After living on Fennstraße for a few years, in 1934 the family moved back into the Lehrter Straße at No.55 in the apartment on the second floor of the front building. Franke lived in this apartment until 1989, before moving to a smaller apartment in the same building, where she lived until her death in 1995. Franke lived a total of over 60 years in the building on Lehrter Straße in the neighborhood to which she was committed throughout her life. After starting work at the Gegenbauer company (de) as a cleaner in 1959 she later became a works council member.

== Social commitment ==
Klara Franke's dedication to the livelihood of the people around her had a profound impact on the Moabit district, especially the Lehrterstrasse neighbourhood. She organized demonstrations, collected petitions, and repeatedly contacted politicians to advocate for the district. During her lifetime, she was known in the Lehrter neighbourhood for her persistent commitment to children, young people, students, seniors, and the disadvantaged. With large and small initiatives, she sought to improve life in the area for example, by creating a playground for children or seating for seniors.

When development of the Moabit district declined sharply in the 1980s and many houses within the district were in need of renovation, Franke committed herself to the citizens' initiatives that were emerging to make the area livable again. Franke was a beacon of this commitment, the effects of which are still visible today. In 1981, she organized protests against the demolition of her row of houses on Lehrter Straße, which she was able to prevent. In 1985, Franke organized the resistance against the planned conversion of the Moabit Hospital into a retirement home. At demonstrations, she opposed the then Health Senator Ulf Fink (CDU) in order to prevent his plans. In 1992 for her commitment to preserving the hospital, she was awarded the Bundesverdienstkreuz (Order of Merit of the Federal Republic of Germany).

Since 2017 a large mural by Christian Kurt Ebert at the Kulturfabrik, at 35 Lehrter Straße 35, is a reminder to Franke's dedication to her causes and commemorated her with the quote: "If you want to achieve something, you have to step on the politicians' toes!" The painting was later removed as part of renovation work on the Kulturfabrik building.

== Awards ==
In 1992, for her social commitment, Franke received the Bundesverdienstkreuz (Federal Cross of Merit on Ribbon), the highest federal decoration of the Federal Republic of Germany, awarded by the Federal President. This award was presented to her by the then district mayor, Wolfgang Naujokat (SPD). It honored Franke's commitment to Lehrter Straße and her persistent fight to preserve the Moabit Hospital. She later commented on this herself, saying: "...actually for the hospital, but I'll just say I'm the only one who got it for her big mouth, yes."

In 1995, Franke received the "Golden Badge of Honor" from the Tiergarten district.

== The Klara Franke Prize ==
Since 2000, the Klara Franke Prize for exceptional civic engagement in the Berlin district of Moabit has generally been awarded every two years. The prize is awarded by the Neighborhood and Self-Help Association on March 6, Franke's birthday.

== Death ==
Klara Franke died peacefully aged 84 on August 26, 1995, while dining with friends at the pizzeria "Mediterraneo" in the Lehrter Strasse. Her friends thought she was having a nap. The final bill still hangs behind a picture of her in the restaurant. She is survived by her daughter, Ingrid Thorius, patron of the Klara Franke Prize.
