= Landgericht Berlin =

Regional court in Berlin

Coordinates: 52°31′37″N 13°17′51″E

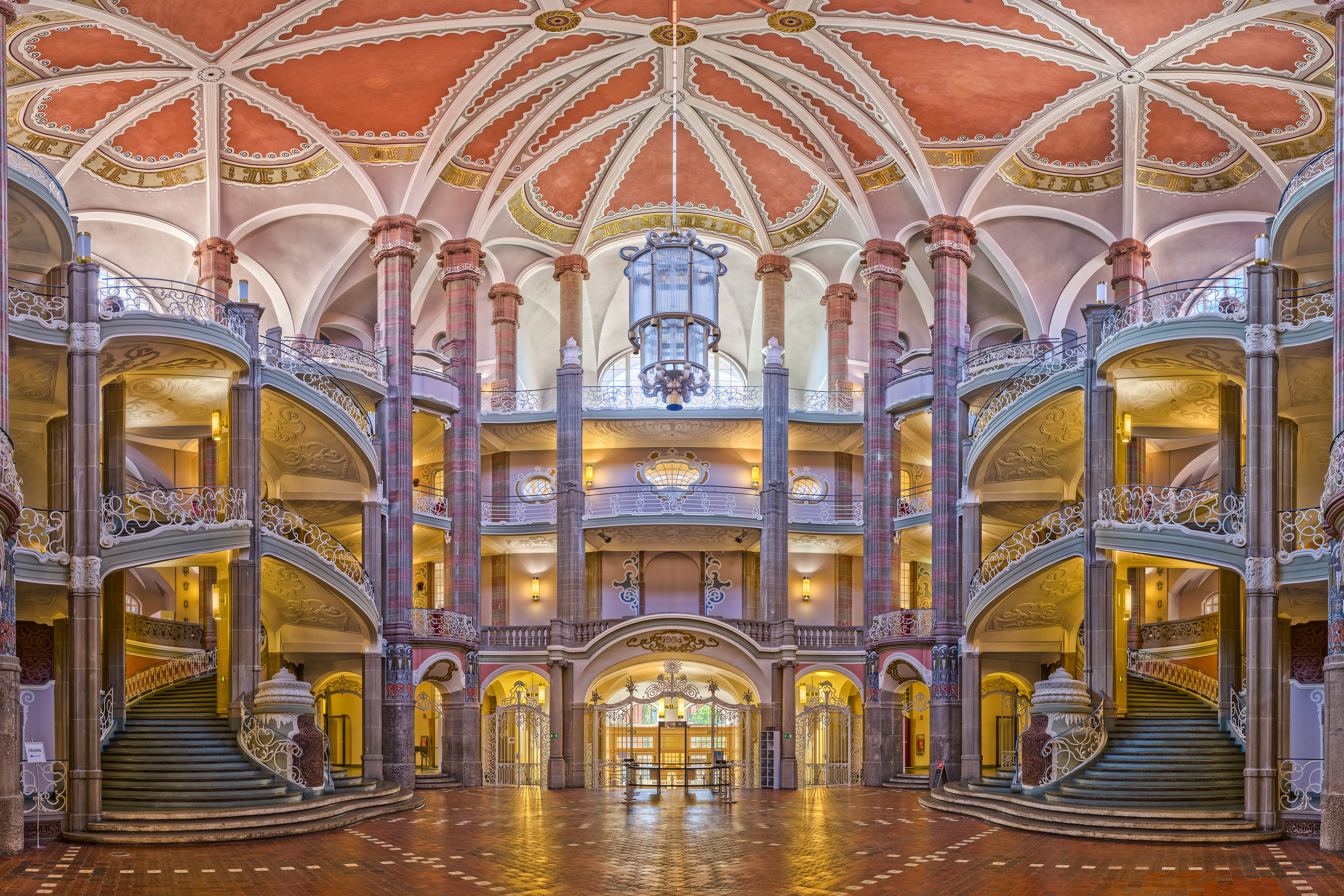
Entrance Hall of Berlin's regional court house located at Littenstraße, central Berlin

The Landgericht Berlin is a regional court in Berlin, divided into two divisions for civil and criminal cases. In the German court hierarchy, it is above the eleven local courts (Amtsgerichte) of the city and below the Kammergericht, which is the highest regional court of Berlin. The Landgericht Berlin is the largest Landgericht in Germany, with about 900 employees.

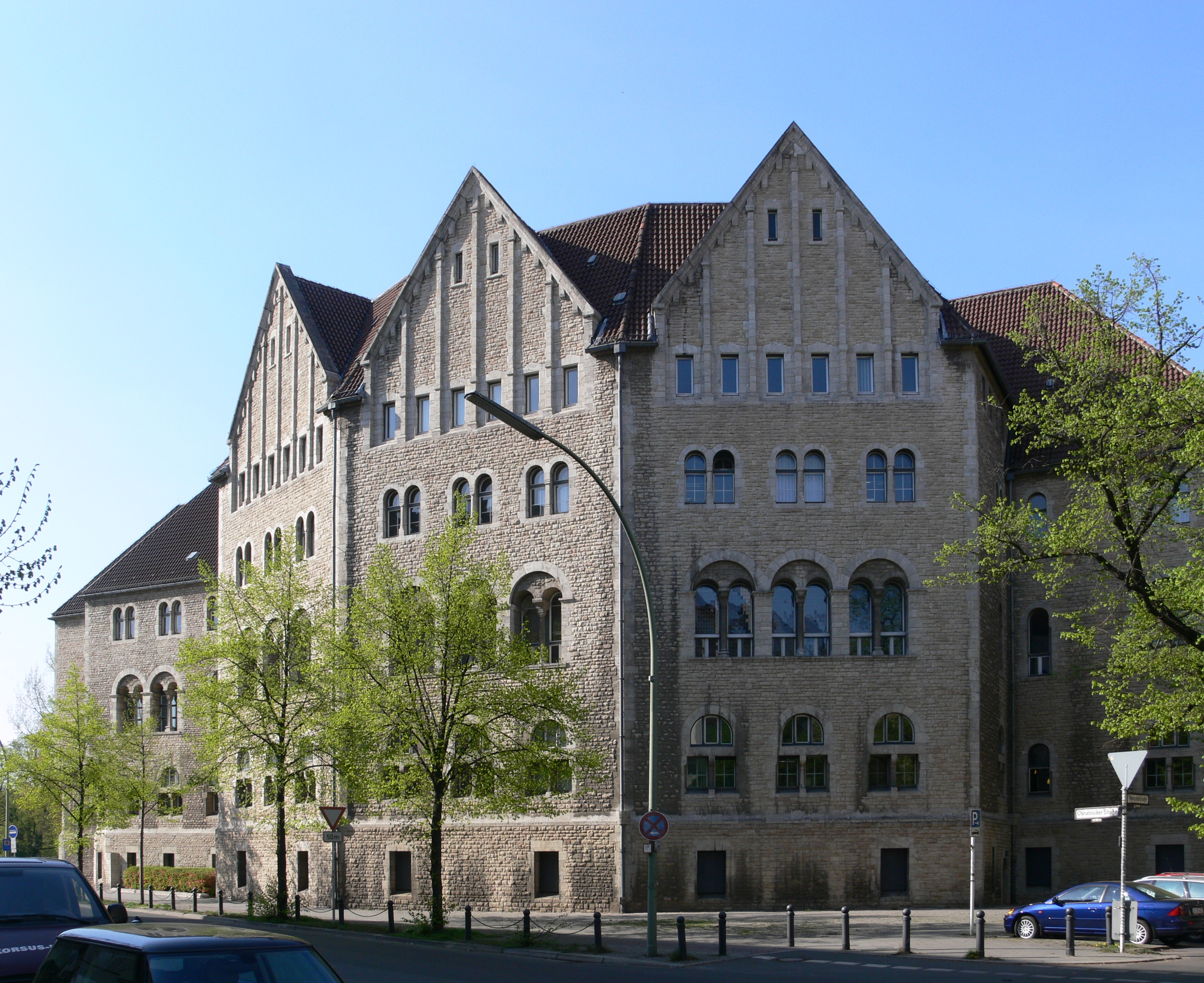
Landgericht, Tegeler Weg

== History ==
Following the 1920 Greater Berlin Act, Berlin had three Landgerichte, known as Landgericht Berlin I, II and III for the central, southern and northern districts of the city. These courts became one single Landgericht, the Landgericht Berlin, in July 1933 by decision by the acting Prussian Justice Minister Hanns Kerrl. He appointed Richard Hoffmann, until May 1933 a lawyer in Magdeburg, as first president of the Landgericht Berlin.

During Berlin's division after World War II the Landgericht building in Berlin-Mitte also contained several city-related courts as well as the Supreme Court and the State Prosecutors Office of East Germany.

== Structure ==
Today, the chambers of the court are distributed over three sites in the city: civil cases are heard in the building of the former Landgericht III on Tegeler Weg in Charlottenburg and also at the seat of the former Landgericht I on Littenstraße in Berlin-Mitte. All criminal cases are concentrated at the Criminal Court (Kriminalgericht) on Turmstraße in Moabit.

The court's seat is Berlin; its district corresponds with the city-state's area. As of 31 December 2013, 13,739 lawyers have been accredited within the district area.
