= Gunther Krabbenhoft =

German fashion model

Gunther Anton Krabbenhoft (born 1945 in Hildesheim) is a German fashion model.

== Early life ==
Gunther Krabbenhoft was born in 1945 near Hanover and grew up with four siblings. He trained as a cook and worked in the profession for around 50 years. He was married at 25, had a daughter, and after divorcing ten years later, he raised her alone.

Since 1968, Krabbenhöft has lived in West Berlin, first in Moabit and then in Kreuzberg. He has two grandchildren.

== Modeling career ==
Krabbenhöft started gaining attention in February 2015 for his regular visits to Berlin's techno clubs.

He is represented as a model by a Berlin advertising agency, with his bowler hat and vest becoming his trademarks.

== Awards ==
- 2015: Street Fashion Pluck Award by VDMD – Network of German Fashion and Textile Designers.
