= Poststadion =

Football stadium in Berlin, Germany

Coordinates: 52°31′48″N 13°21′34″E

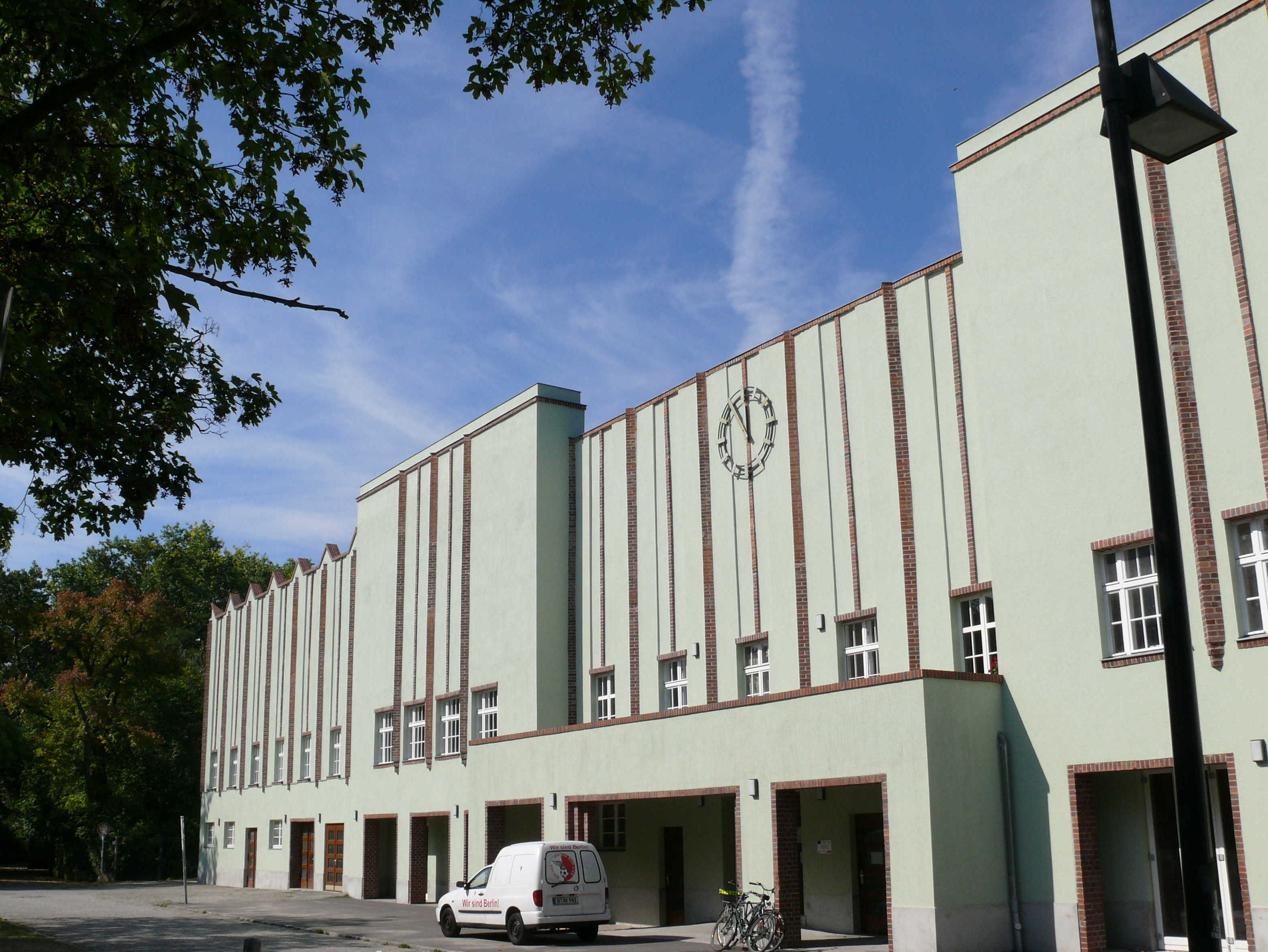
- Interactive map of Poststadion
- Full name: Poststadion
- Location: Moabit, Mitte, Berlin, Germany
- Operator: Borough of Mitte
- Capacity: 10,000
- Surface: Grass
- Field size: 105 x 62

Construction
- Opened: 28 May 1929
- Renovated: 2003-present
- Architect: Georg Demmler

Tenants
- SC Union 06 Berlin; Berliner AK 07

The Poststadion is a multi-use stadium in the locality of Moabit of the borough of Mitte in Berlin, Germany. The stadium was built in 1929 for the sports club of the German Reichspost at the site of a former Prussian Uhlan parade ground. It is adjacent to the Fritz Schloß Park.

The stadium has been a designated landmark since 1990. The facility fell into disrepair during the 1980s and several attempts to renovate the stadium failed in the following decades. The first renovations were carried out in 2003. Its original architecture has been conserved in the original structures of the main entrance in the Lehrter Strasse, with its rows of ticket booths lining the entrance. The main stand of the stadium was renovated in 2010. The stadium was equipped with floodlights in 2021.

The field is used mostly for regional football and hosts the home matches of SC Union 06 Berlin and, since 2008, Berlin AK 07. It is located adjacent to Fritz Schloß Park.

Together with the Fritz Schloß Park, the facility is also known as SportPark Poststadion. The Sports complex is one of the largest sports facilities in Berlin and is currently managed by the Berlin borough of Mitte.

The stadium today holds 10,000 spectators. At its peak, it held up to 45,000 spectators, who on 10 May 1930 saw the Germany national football team play an exciting 3–3 against England, one of the first encounters between the two teams. Richard Hofmann scored all three goals for Germany before England's David Jack finally equalised late in the match.

After the Deutsches Stadion in Charlottenburg had been closed in 1934, the Poststadion became the site of the German championship final. FC Schalke 04 won with 2–1 over 1. FC Nürnberg, who themselves gained the title two years later in a 2–1 match against Fortuna Düsseldorf. The stadium was also used as a professional boxing arena, and on 7 July 1935 Max Schmeling won against Paulino Uzcudun after twelve rounds.

Several football matches during the 1936 Summer Olympics were held at the Poststadion. On 7 August 1936 outsider Norway knocked Germany out of the tournament by a 2–0 win in the quarter-finals, in front of 55,000 spectators. The Nazi leadership including Adolf Hitler witnessed this defeat, whereafter team manager Otto Nerz was immediately dismissed and replaced by Sepp Herberger. Major football events afterwards were held at the Olympiastadion.

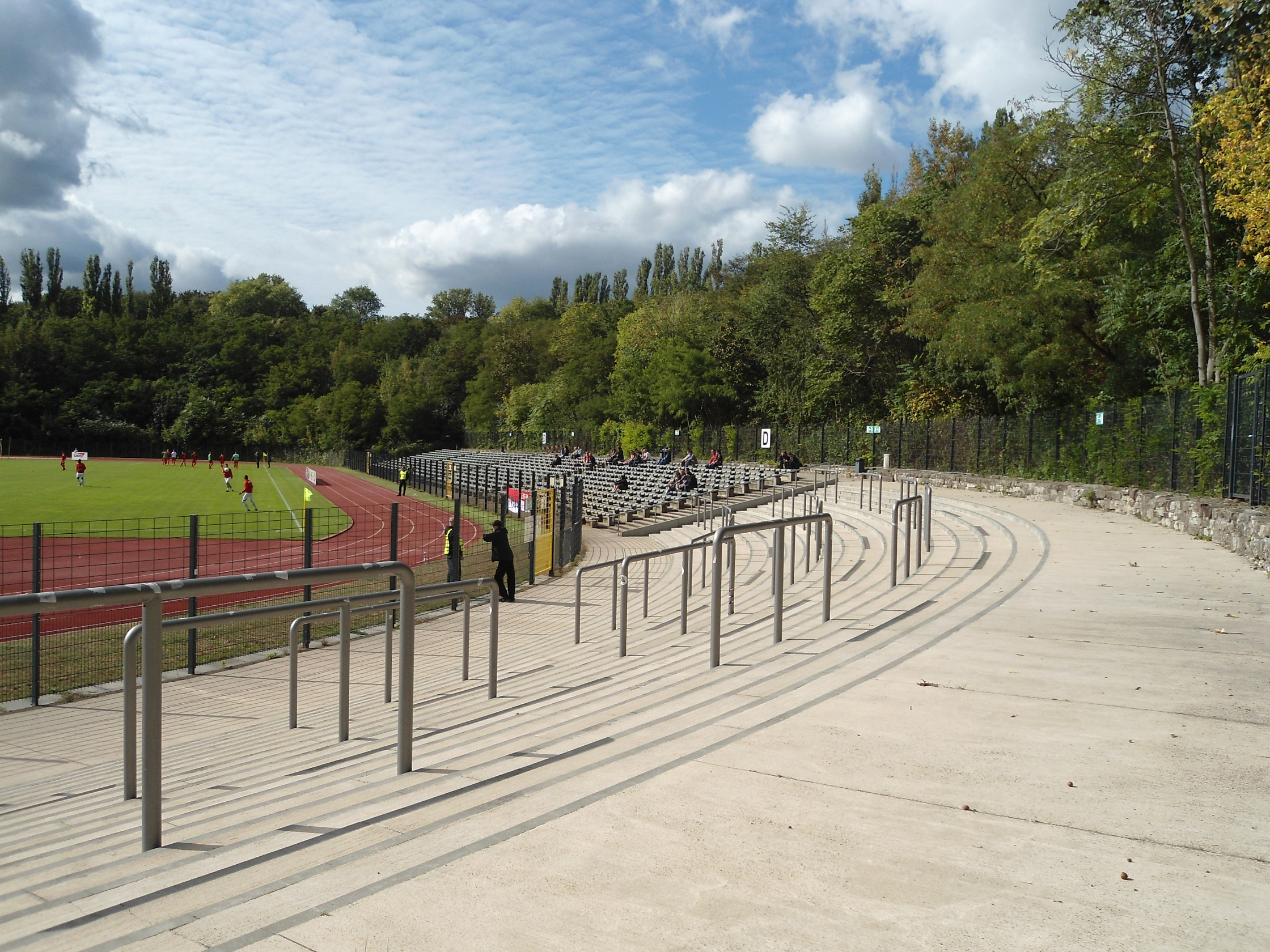
Corner terrace and open seating, 2012

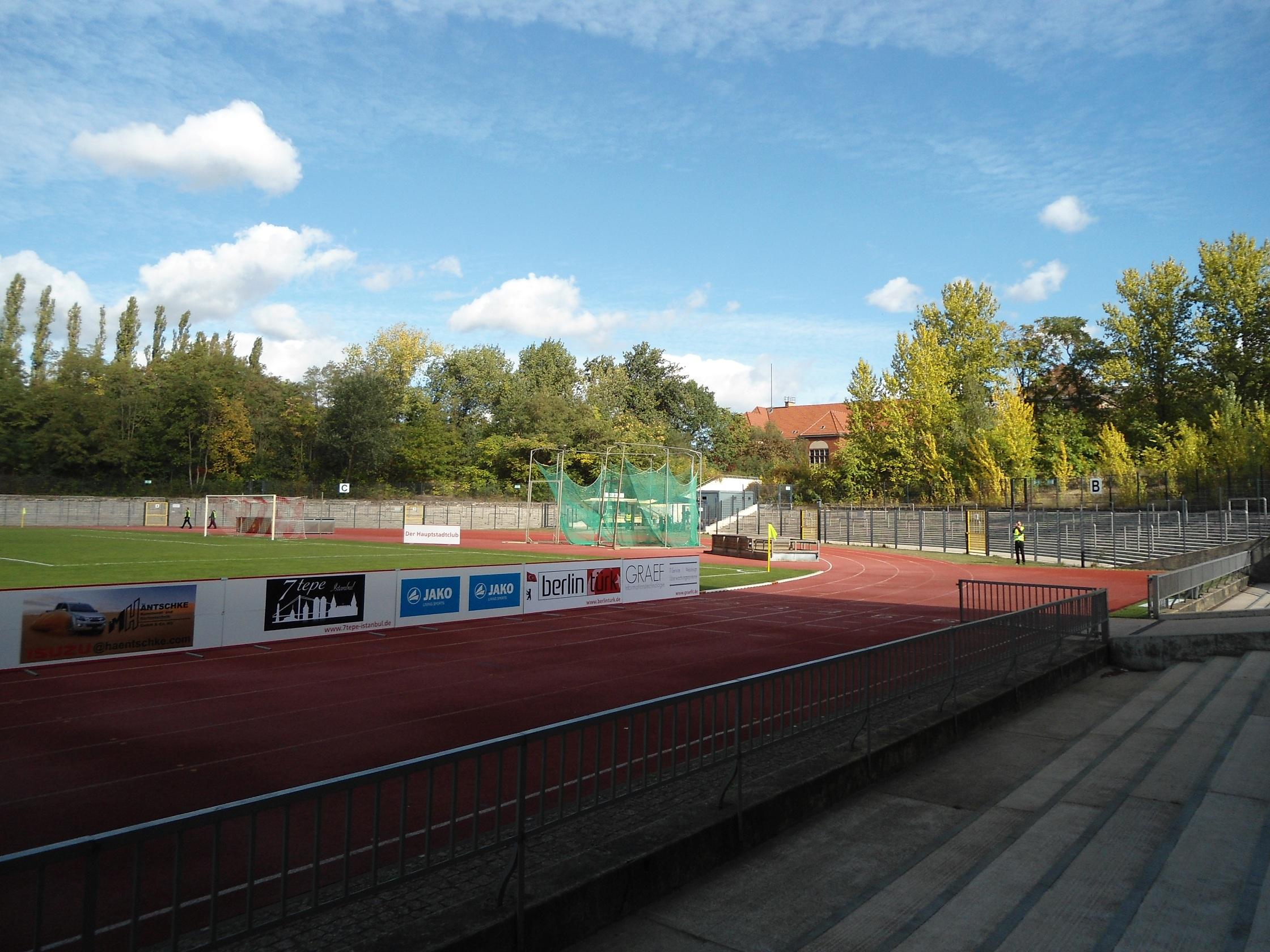
Terraced end of the ground, 2012

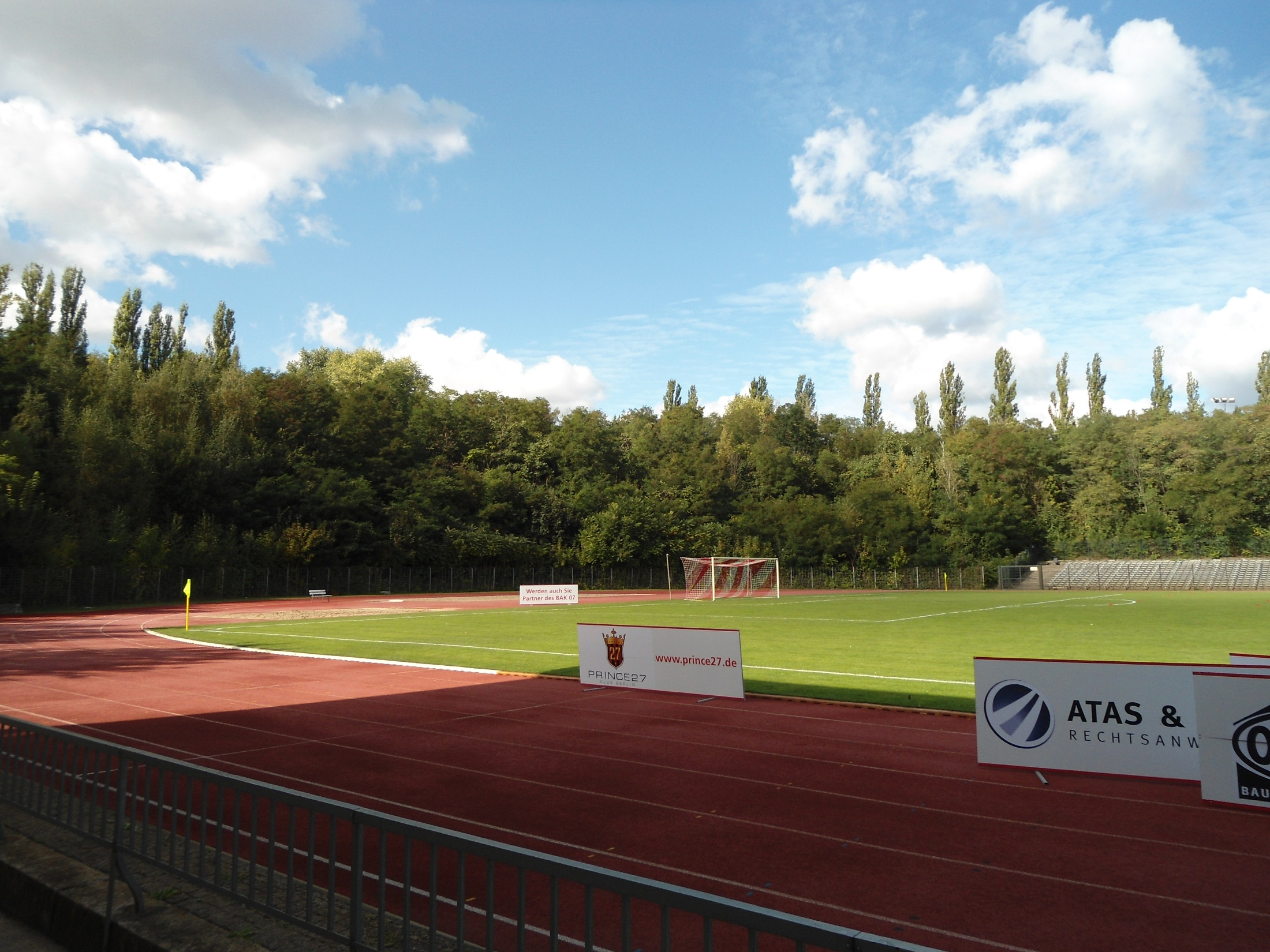
Undeveloped end of the ground, 2012

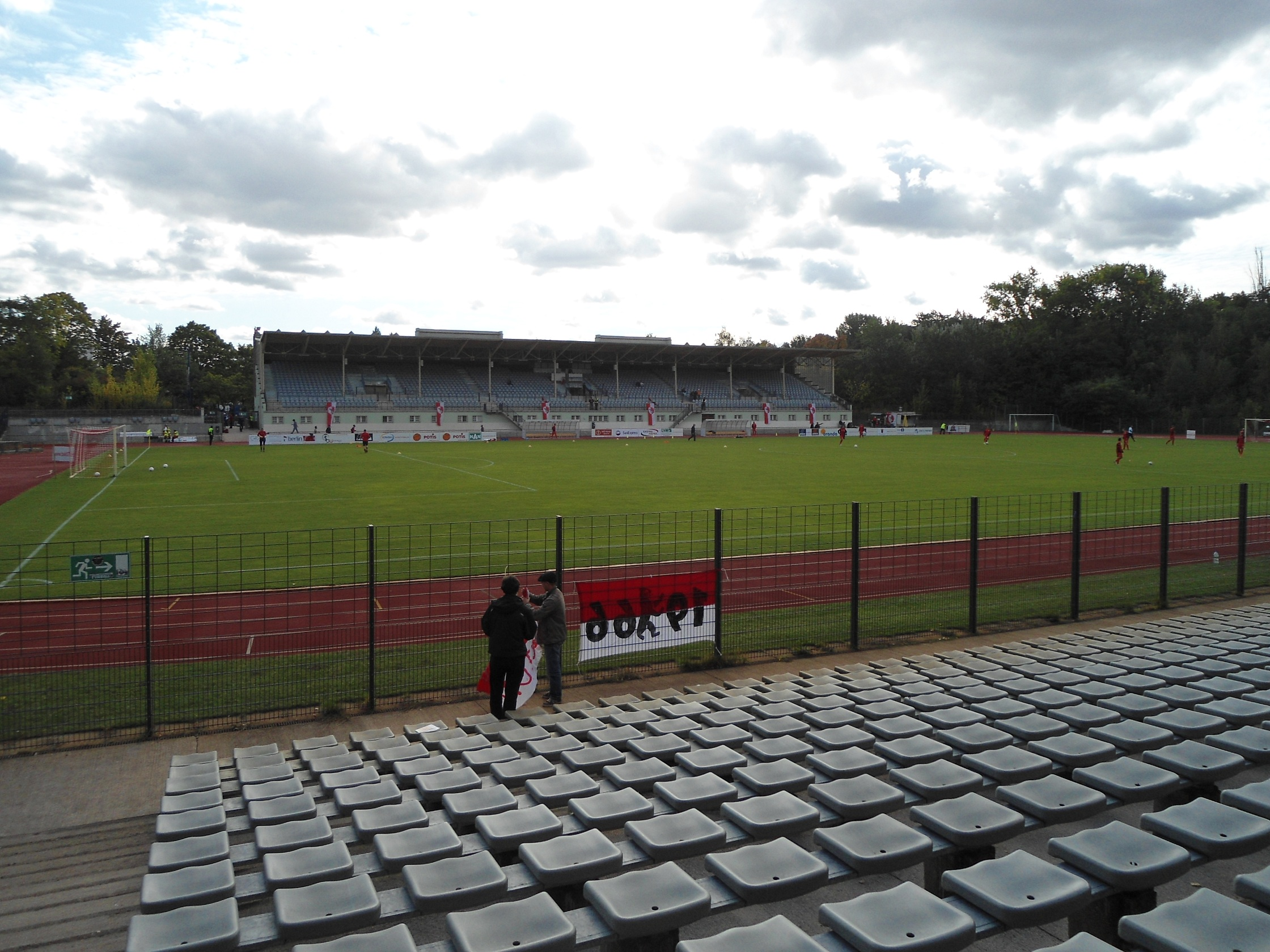
Main stand from the other side of the pitch, 2012

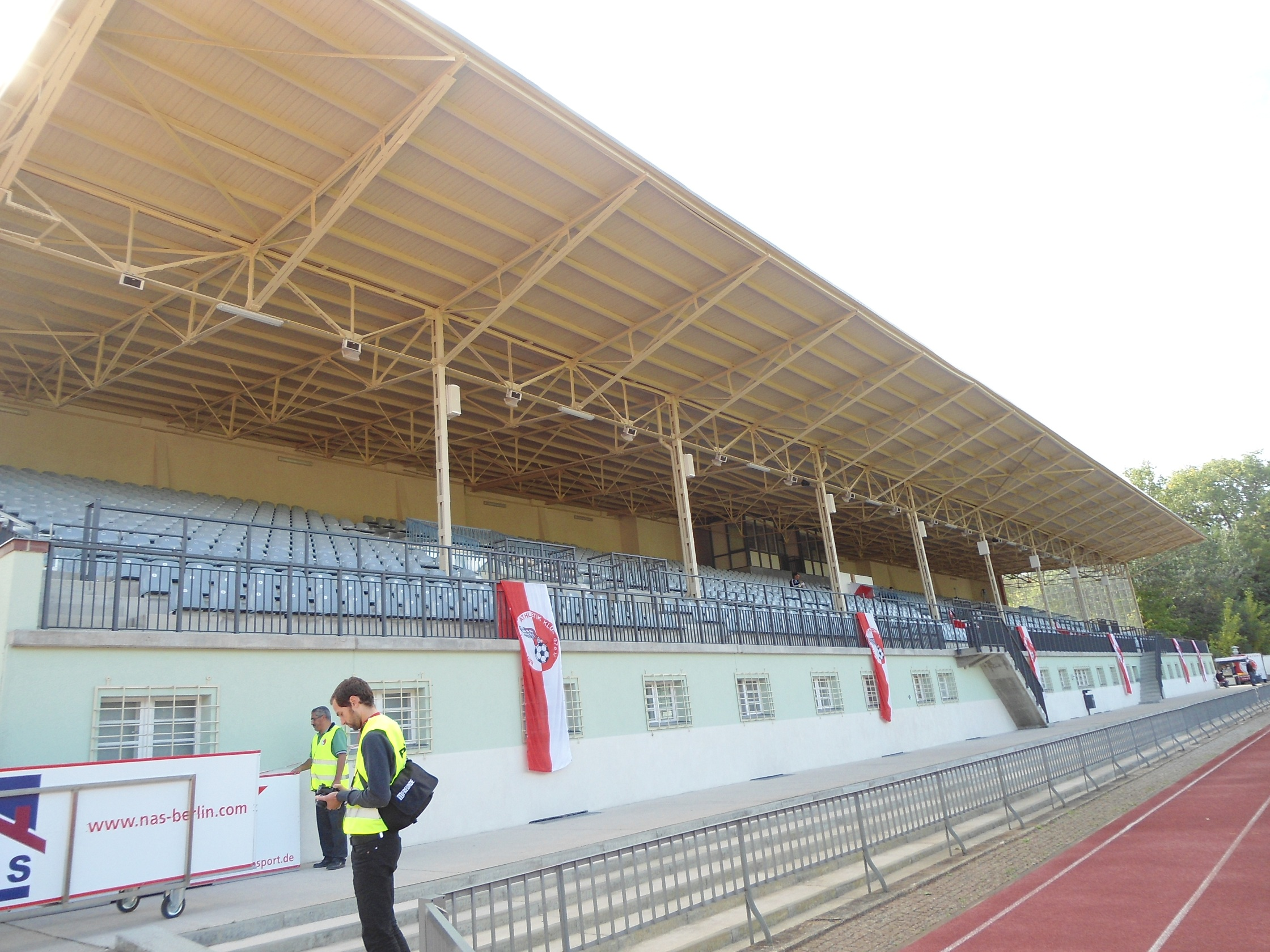
Main stand, 2012

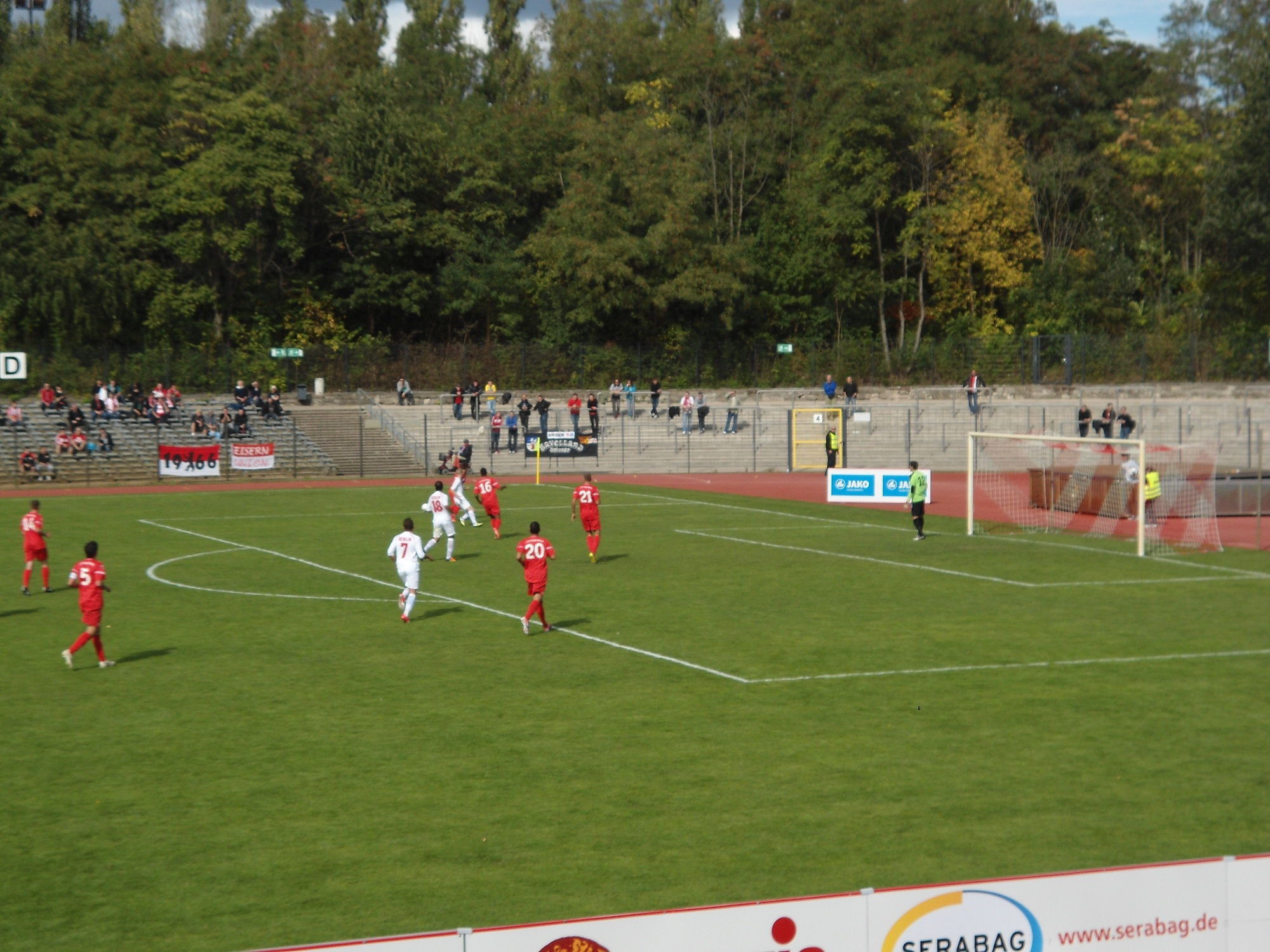
Berliner AK 07 vs 1. FC Union Berlin II, 2012
