= Fritz Schloß Park =

Park in Berlin

- Fritz-Schloß-Park
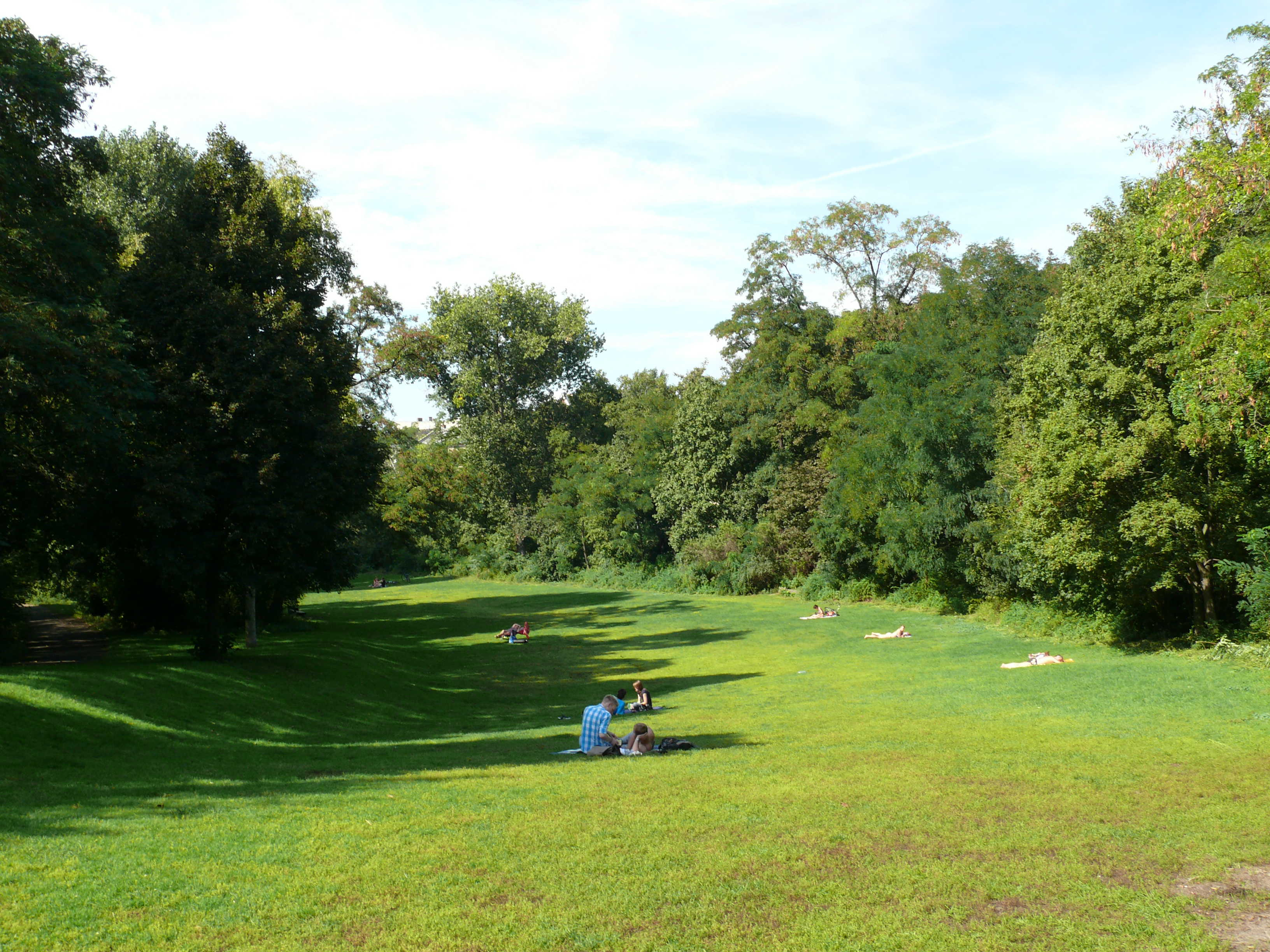
- Open sunbathing area in Fritz Schloß Park

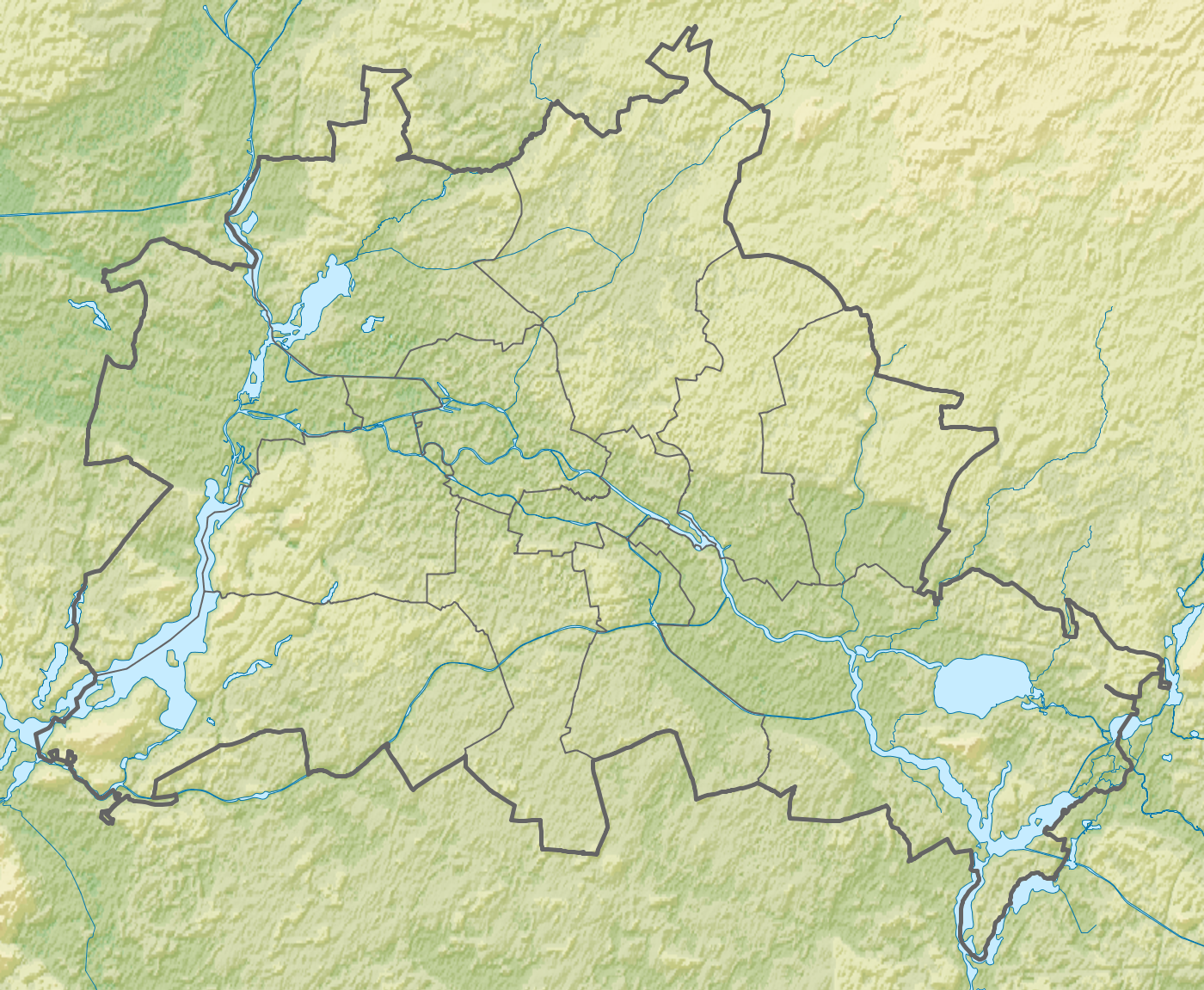
- Location within Berlin
- Type: Urban park
- Location: Moabit, Berlin
- Coordinates: 52°31′43″N 13°21′24″E
- Area: 12 hectares (30 acres)
- Created: 1955
- Status: Open year-round

Fritz Schloß Park is a park in Berlin in the district of Moabit, located in the borough of Mitte.

== Location ==
The park is located adjacent to the Poststadion between Rathenower Straße, Kruppstraße, Seydlitzstraße, and Lehrter Straße. The location was previously used as a military drill ground, and is today surrounded by residential and commercial spaces situated in former barracks. With a size of roughly 12 hectares, the park is the largest in Moabit.

== History ==
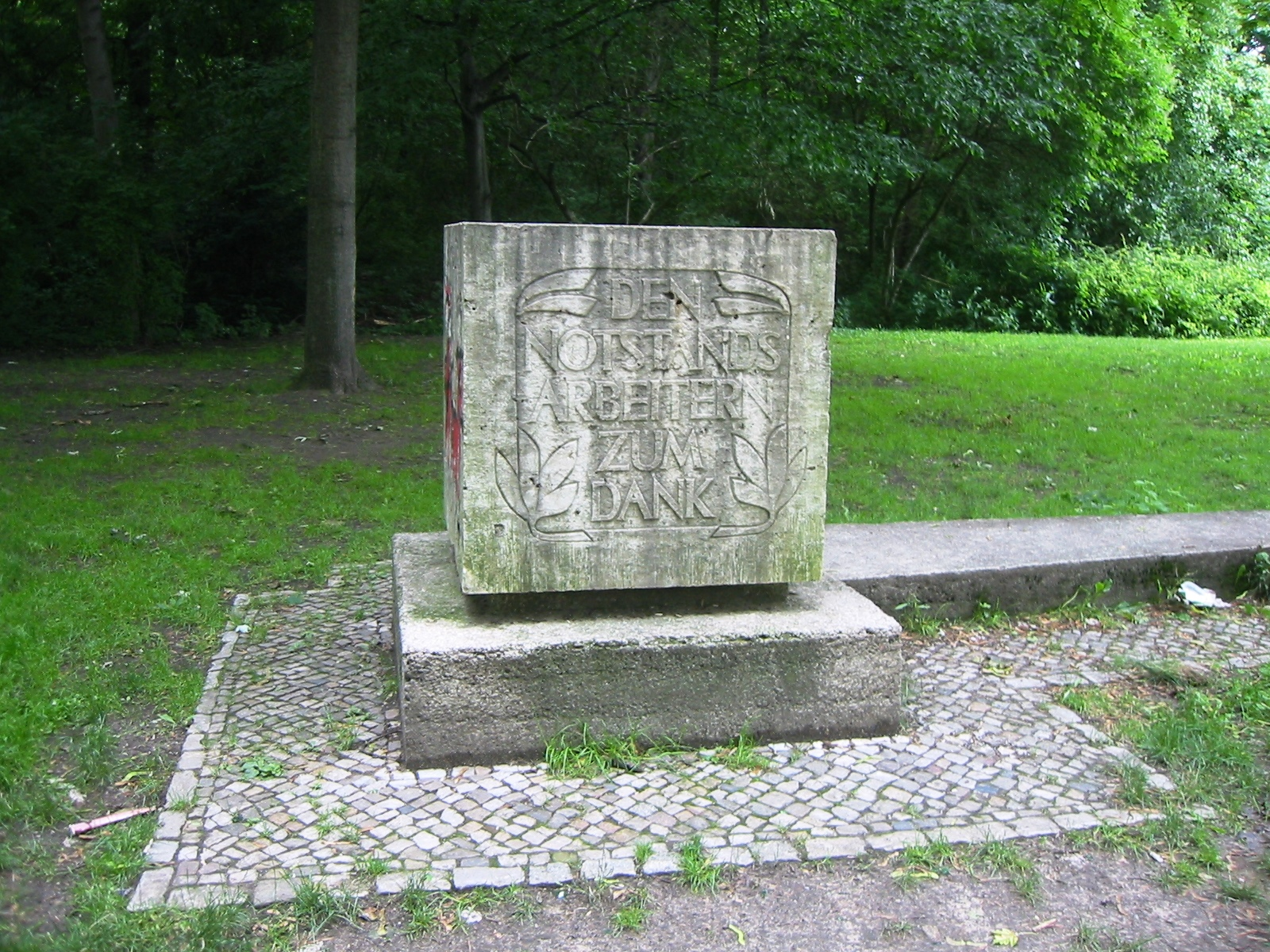
Memorial dedicated to the Trümmerfrauen

After World War II, the military grounds were used as a dumping ground for debris from allied bombing, which in 1955 was covered in dirt by landscape architect Wilhelm Alverdes to form a Schuttberg which is located within the park. The park was named after Fritz Schloß (1895–1954), who was the mayor of the former district of Berlin-Tiergarten (since 2001 district Mitte) from 1946–52, which encompassed Moabit. The park contains a memorial by Alfred Frenkel dedicated to the Trümmerfrauen, the women who helped clear rubble and rebuild the city after the war.

The park is adjacent to the Poststadion, a multi-purpose stadium that was the site of several events during the 1936 Summer Olympics, including a quarter-final football match between Germany and Sweden. The grounds also contain additional football pitches, tennis courts, and other recreational facilities. An indoor swimming facility is directly accessible from the parking area on Seydlitzstraße. An open-air swimming facility was closed in 2002 and used as a campsite from 2006 until 2011. The park also contains a playground.

In 2009, a 1.1-kilometre (0.7 mi) red path was added with fitness devices, with distance markers every 50 meters.

== Planned mass transit connections ==
As part of a long-term expansion plan for the Berlin U-Bahn U5 line, a station was planned at Fritz Schloß Park, which would eventually have connected Berlin Hauptbahnhof to Turmstraße, Jungfernheide, Urban Tech Republic and towards Rathaus Reinickendorf. These plans were removed by 2017, and replaced by the M10 tram extension from Berlin Hauptbahnhof, which largely duplicated the U5's planned route.
