= Moabit Criminal Court =

Baroque Revival building in Berlin

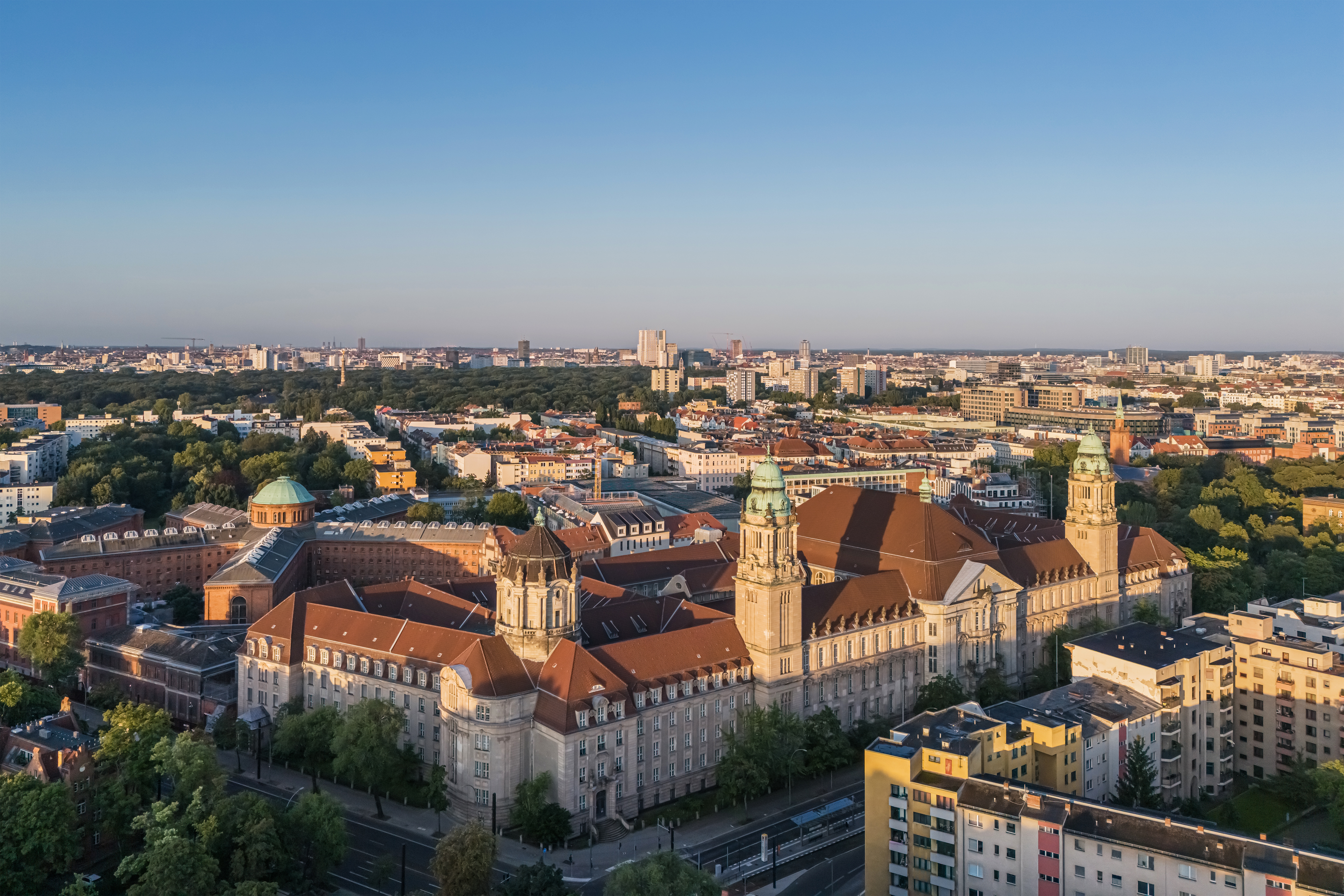
The Moabit Criminal Court building, aerial view

The Moabit Criminal Court (German Kriminalgericht Moabit) is the central criminal court of Berlin, Germany, located in the district of Moabit. It is the largest criminal court in Europe with 340 judges and 360 prosecutors. It is part of the Berlin's Landgericht.

The first Moabit Criminal Court was built between 1877 and 1881 on the Rathenower Strasse. This building was damaged in the Second World War and subsequently demolished. The present criminal court Baroque Revival building was erected in 1902–1906 as the "new" criminal court on Turmstraße behind the Moabit prison. The building hosts 21 courtrooms. Upon its completion it was deemed extraordinarily modern with its own power station, goods and passenger lifts, central heating, own telephone system and its own water supply with a water tower. The building has been added to the list of Berlin monuments.

The Moabit Criminal Court receives about 60,000 new criminal cases a year, in addition to about 100,000 cases of "other business" such as penalty orders, and about 24,000 cases of fines.
