= Lehrter Straße =

Street in Berlin

- Lehrterstraße, Lehrter Strasse, and Lehrterstrasse
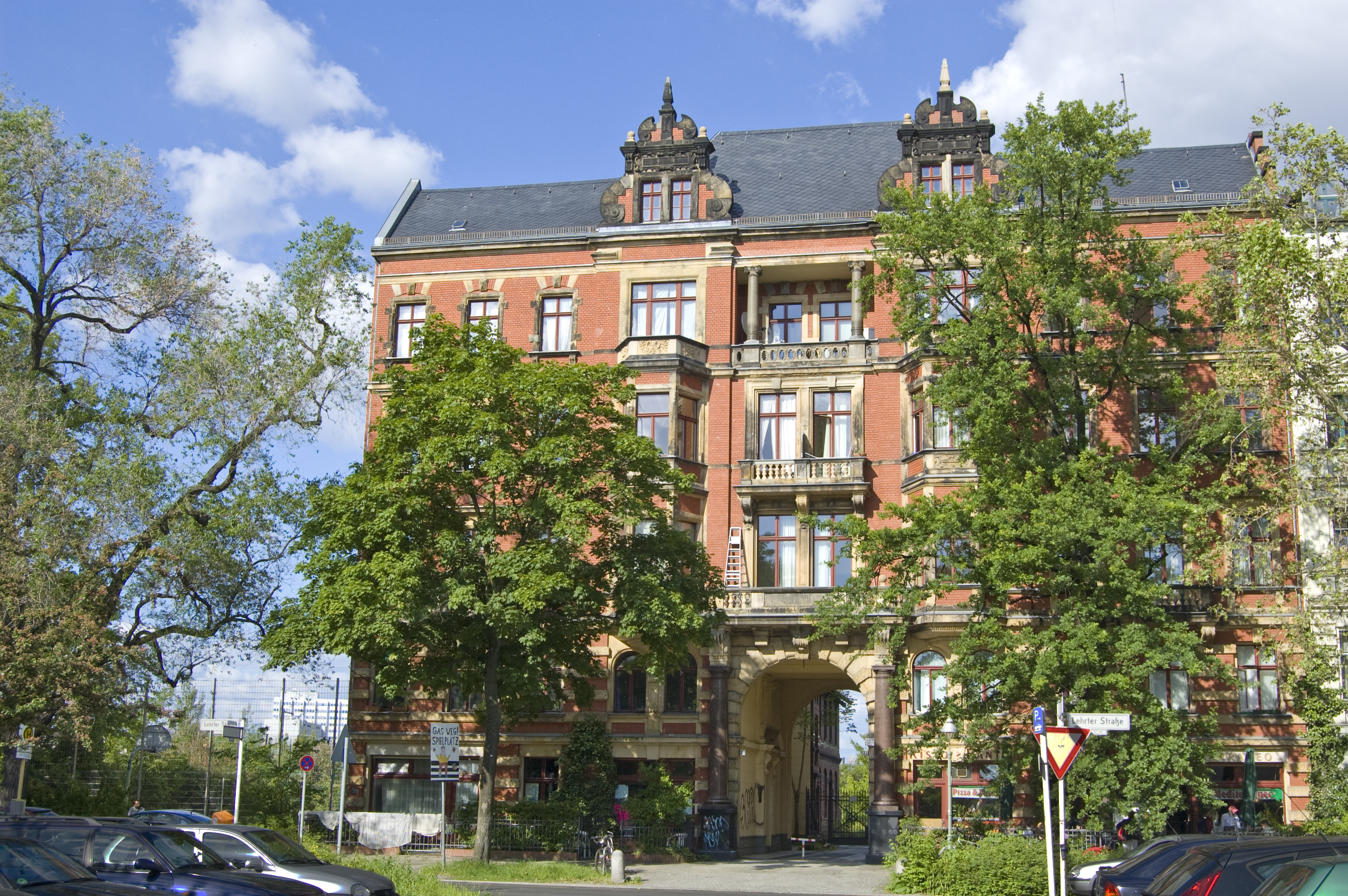
- Gründerzeit house at No. 30
- Interactive map of Lehrter Straße
- Former names: Part of Torfstraße; (until 6 August 1872)
- Namesake: Lehrter Bahnhof
- Type: Street
- Location: Berlin, Germany
- Quarter: Moabit
- Nearest metro station: Hauptbahnhof; Birkenstraße
- Coordinates: 52°31′52″N 13°21′41″E
- South end: Clara-Jaschke-Straße; Invalidenstraße
- Major junctions: Seydlitzstraße; Klara-Franke-Straße; Kruppstraße
- North end: Perleberger Straße

Other
- Known for: Prison, stadium (Post stadion)

Lehrter Straße (also: Lehrterstraße, Lehrter Strasse, and Lehrterstrasse (see ß)) is a residential street in Moabit, a sub district of Mitte, one of Berlin's 12 boroughs of which the borders were redefined following the 1989 Fall of the Berlin Wall. It runs for an almost completely straight length, except for a small kink shortly before its southern extremity. The street is approximately 1,500 metres (0.93 miles) long and lies in a southeasterly direction from the Perleberger Strasse near the Fenn Bridge, to the west of, and parallel to the disused Lehrter railway complex which was disbanded in the 1950s. It joins the Invalidenstraße a few hundred metres from the new Berlin Hauptbahnhof (Berlin's central railway station), near the site of the former Invalidenstraße East-West Berlin Cold War checkpoint. The street consists of 75 houses numbered in horseshoe fashion. After the Invalidenstrasse intersection the traffic route continues south on Clara-Jaschke Strasse.

Formerly called Torfstraße running in a straight north-south direction, it was bisected by the construction of the railway line. The southern part beginning at the junction with the Perlebergerstrasse received its new name, Lehrterstraße on 6 August 1872 on the commissioning of the Lehrter railway station in 1871. A number of the buildings in the street have been placed under historical monument protection.

== History ==
In the 19th century, the west side of Lehrter Straße was largely barracks, officers' residences and a parade ground. On the eastern side, the facilities of the Lehrter railway lines ran behind or over prison grounds and military buildings. Accommodation was provided for the railway employees and at the beginning of the 20th century the residential tenement buildings were constructed.

A military complex of nine buildings was built around 1900 on the parade ground in Berlin's Moabit district by the Prussian army. After the Second World War, the complex was no longer needed and from the 1970s, the empty houses being on the edge of West Berlin near the wall fell largely abandoned and became partly derelict.

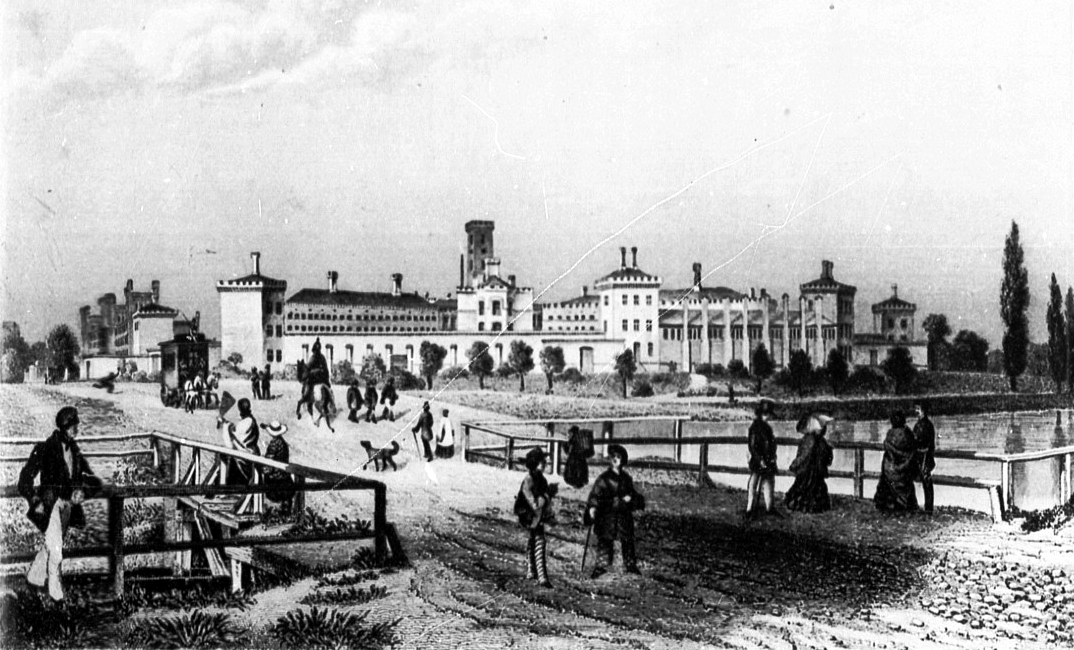
The Lehrterstraße prison. (Engraving from around 1855)

Before the opening of the Olympia Stadium for the 1936 Olympics, the listed Poststadion, built in 1929 for the sports club of the German Reichspost at the site of a former Prussian Uhlan parade ground, was Berlin's major stadium with a capacity of 55,000 spectators. Undergoing an ongoing programme of restoration since 2003, the Poststadion and its sport park is one of the city's largest sport complexes. By the 1970s due to a plan to lay an urban expressway through the neighbourhood; the late 19th and early 20th century, partly derelict, traditional working-class tenements, warehouses, and factories were mostly empty. The plan was shelved and by the end of the 1970s, the houses on the northern end of the street began to be occupied by squatters, a Hells Angels chapter, and a vibrant community of struggling artists, musicians, and students.

On the reunification of Germany in 1990, Lehrterstraße suddenly found itself in the centre of the reunited city. The old buildings, some of which had previously been slated for demolition, were restored and renovated, even before the road was designated as a redevelopment area. In 2010, two hotels were built, and terraced houses with small gardens were built on the corner of Seydlitzstrasse.

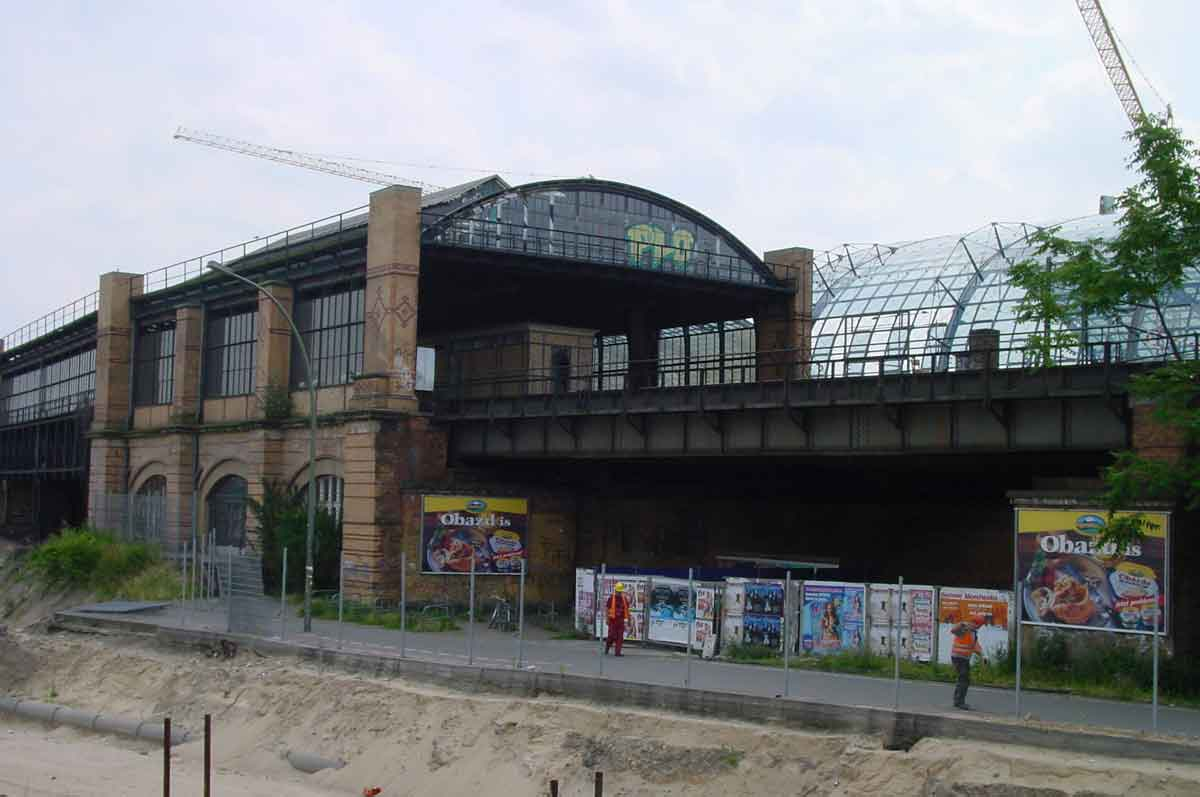
S-Bahn station shortly before demolition in 2002. The new central station can be seen behind it

The district office in the center of Berlin has drawn up development plans for a new district behind the historic brick wall of the former railway site. This would take in most of the large derelict railway yard on the eastern side of the Lehrterstraße which is currently home to 34 garden allotments and other railway buildings, The Berlin City Mission built an office and congress center at Lehrterstraße 68 near the southern end of the road, and also runs a collection depot for donated clothing in the basement.

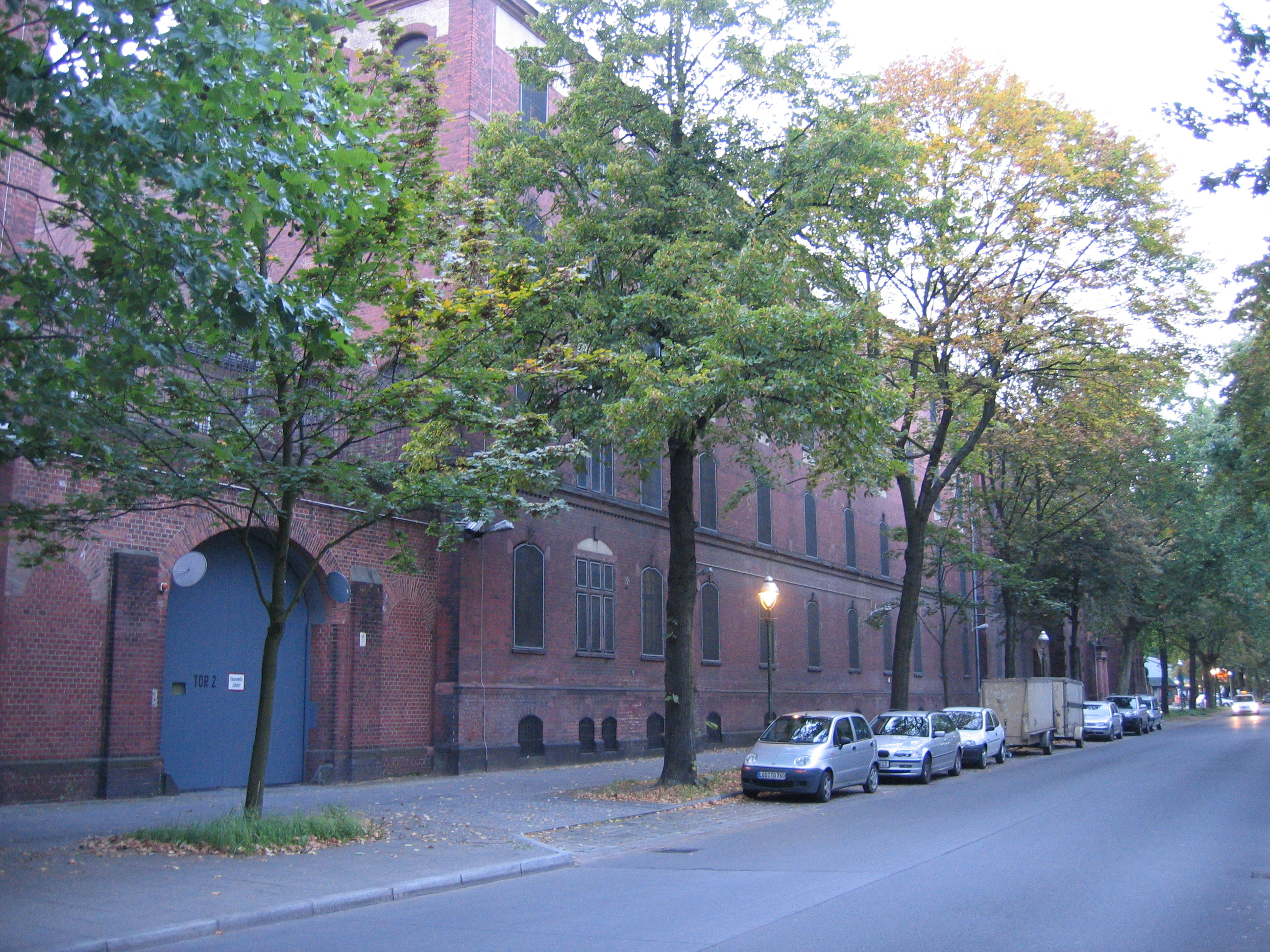
Lehrterstraße prison in 2007

The largest building in the ensemble – the former uniform clothing factory at Lehrterstraße 57 – was converted and refurbished by Sauerbruch Hutton, an international architecture and design firm, between 2008 and extended in 2010. Outside, the historic listed brick facade remains while inside, the most modern techniques and materials for optimal use have been employed in order to address today's requirements.

== The new Mittenmang quarter ==
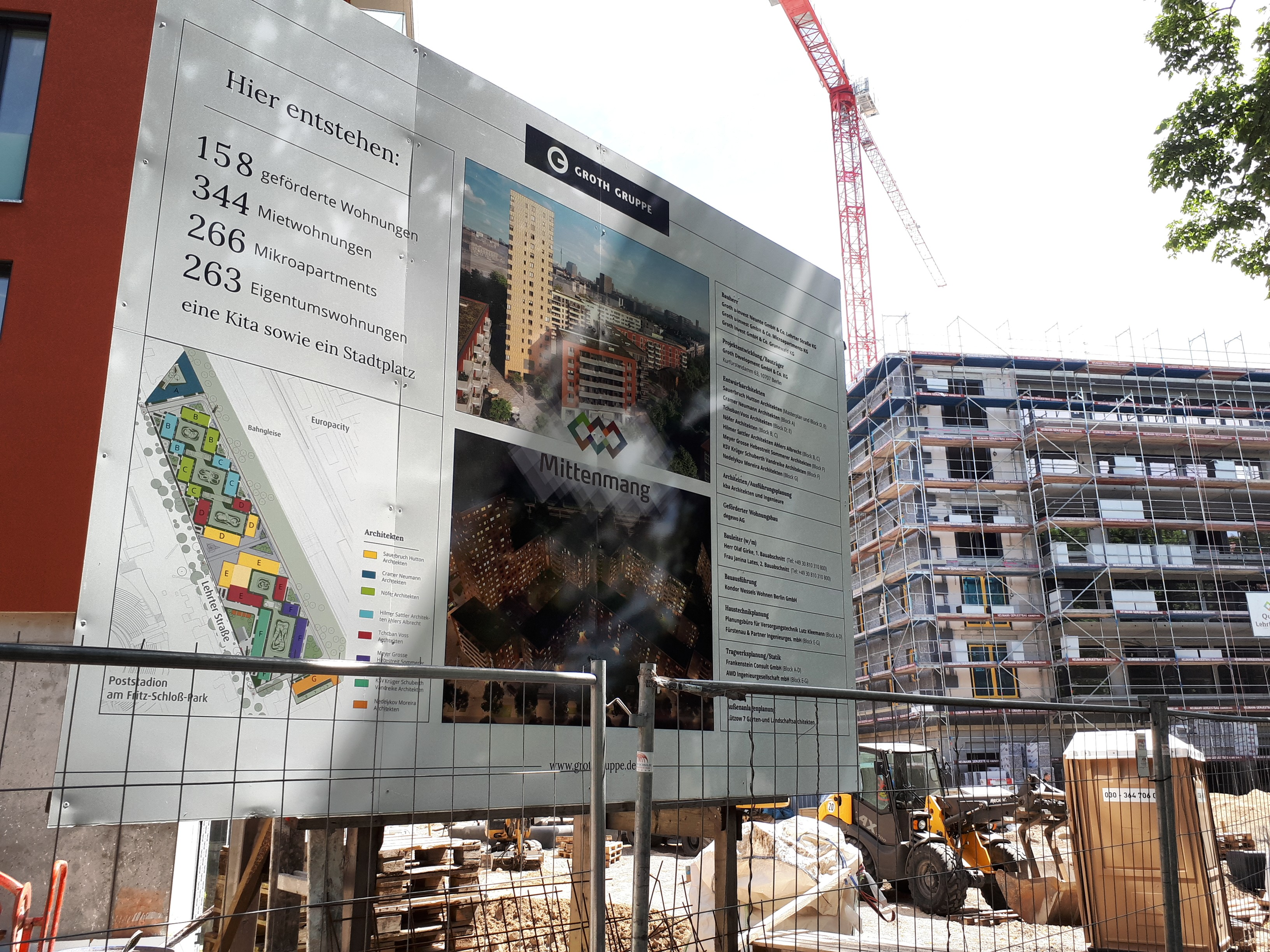
The new Mittenmang quarter under construction 2018

On the eastern side of the middle section of the road between the sports facilities at the Poststadion and the Europacity on the 3.7 hectares of the former railway depot of the since 1952 obsolete Lehrter station, a new city subdistrict, Mittenmang, with about 1000 rental and condominiums and the associated urban infrastructure, developed in 2018. The proposal was not entirely well-received by the local population due to its upmarket costs but the main road through the development is named in memory of the Moabit social activist Klara Franke (1911 - 1994), the neighbourhood 'mother'.

== Conservation ==
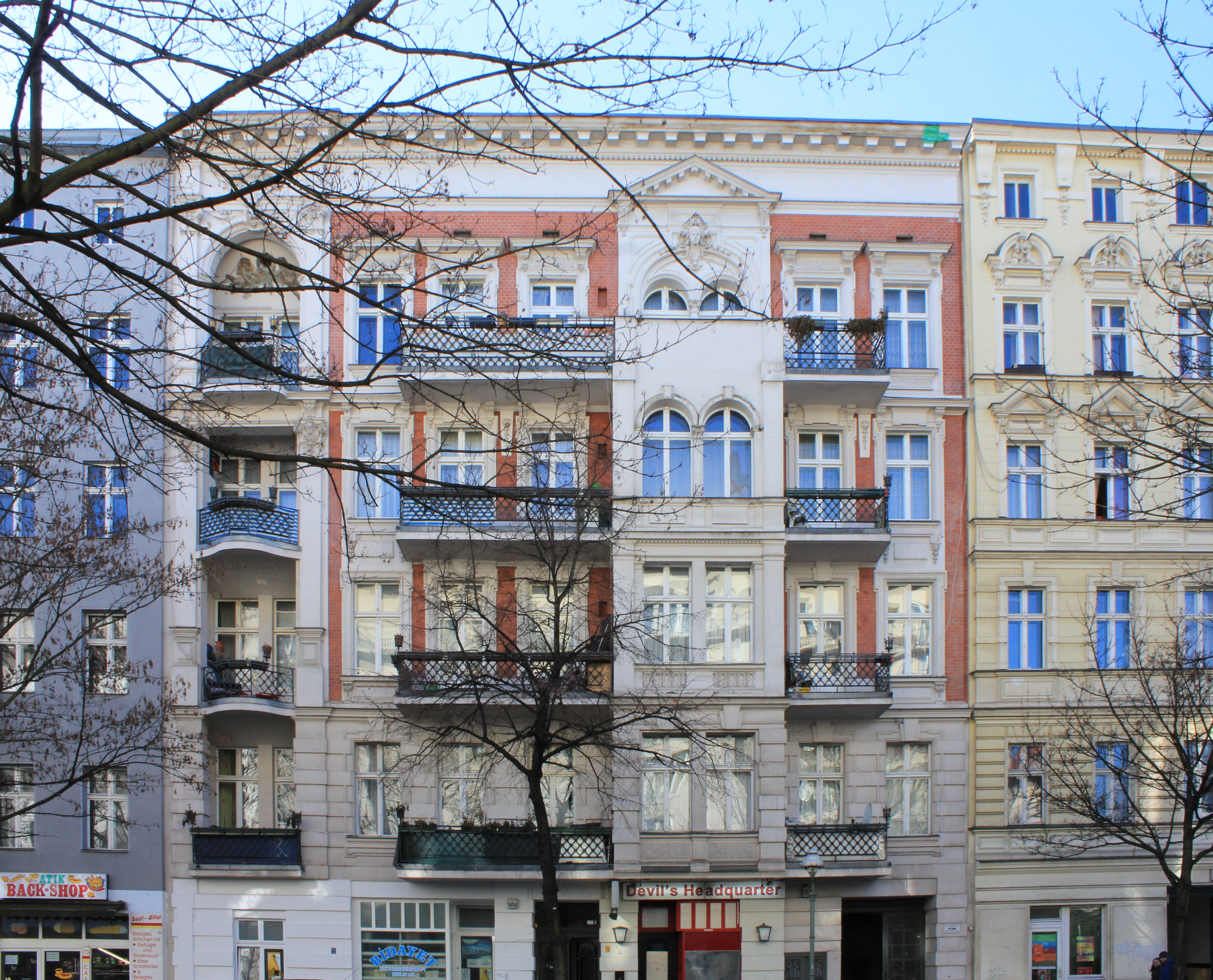
The tenement at No. 48

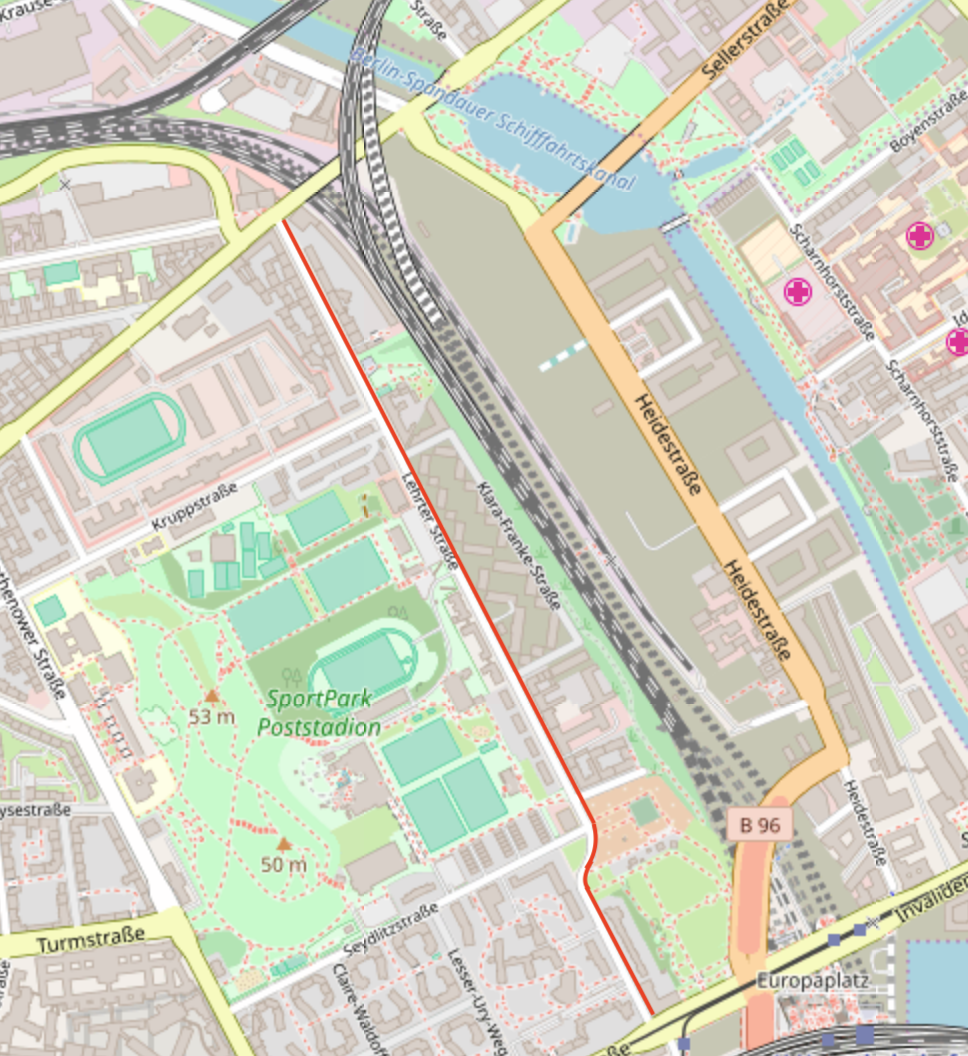
Map of the street

Several buildings in the street have been placed under historical monument protection: the prison, the houses 6 to 10, and 27 to 30; the house at No.48, a tenement block; built in 1894. The former Berlin Royal Military Clothing Department made uniforms at No.57 and 58. The Werthheim House at No. 35 was a factory and warehouse of the Wertheim company. Parts of the Poststadion sport stadium at No. 59 including the indoor swimming pool.

== Transport ==
Lehrter Straße is served in its length by the bus route 123. The nearest U-Bahn station (tube/subway) for the northern end is Birkenstrasse on Line U9, about a 15 minute walk from the street's junction with the Perlebergerstrasse. The southern end of the Lehrterstrasse is served directly by the Berlin Central Station which in addition to it main railway lines, includes the S-Bahn (a surface metro railway) Lines S3, S5, S7, and S9; the U-Bahn Line U55, and tram (Metrotram) lines M5, M8, and M10.
