= Turmstraße =

Street in Berlin, Germany

Coordinates: 52°31′34.7″N 13°20′34.9″E

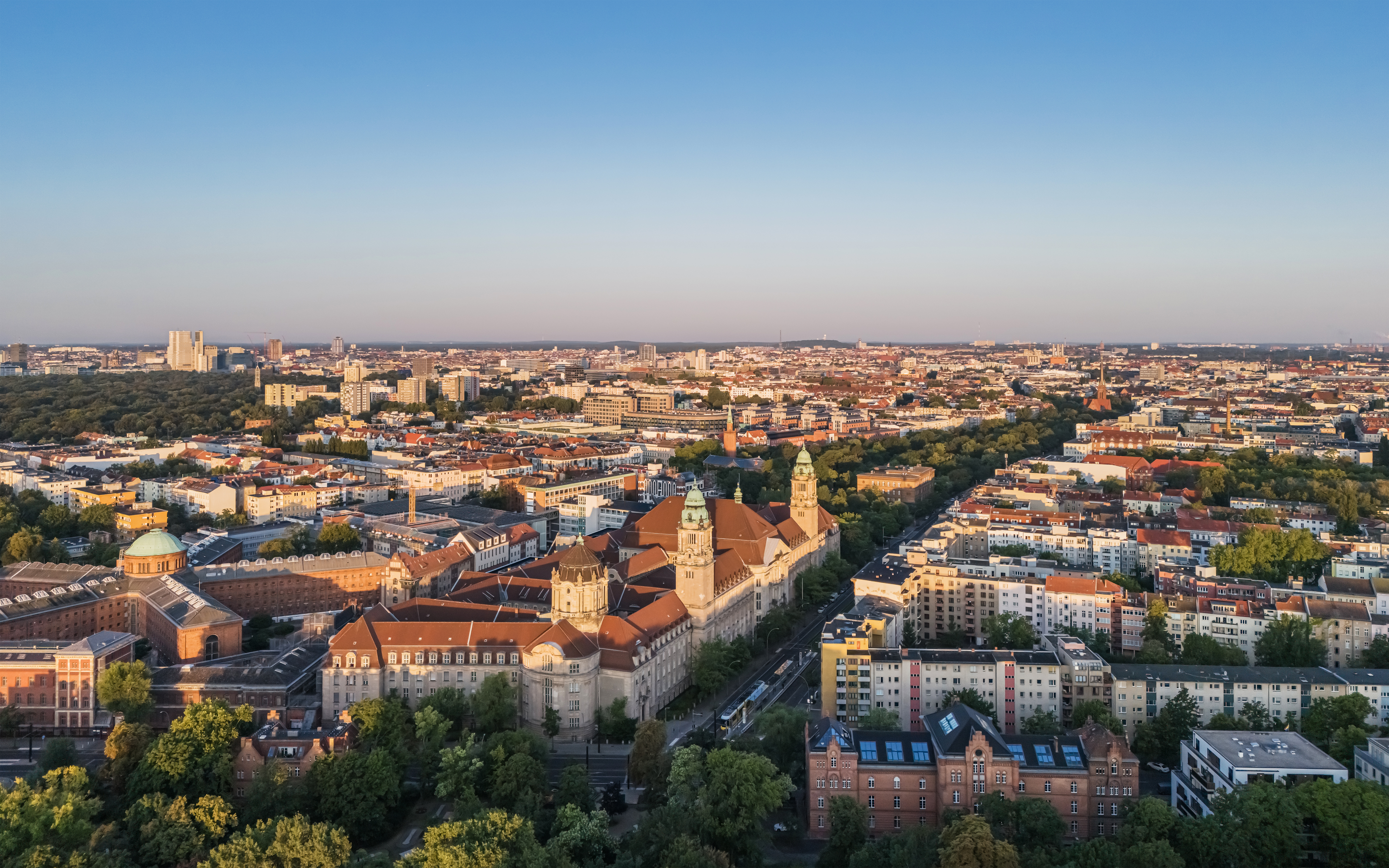
Moabit Courthouse, Turmstraße 91

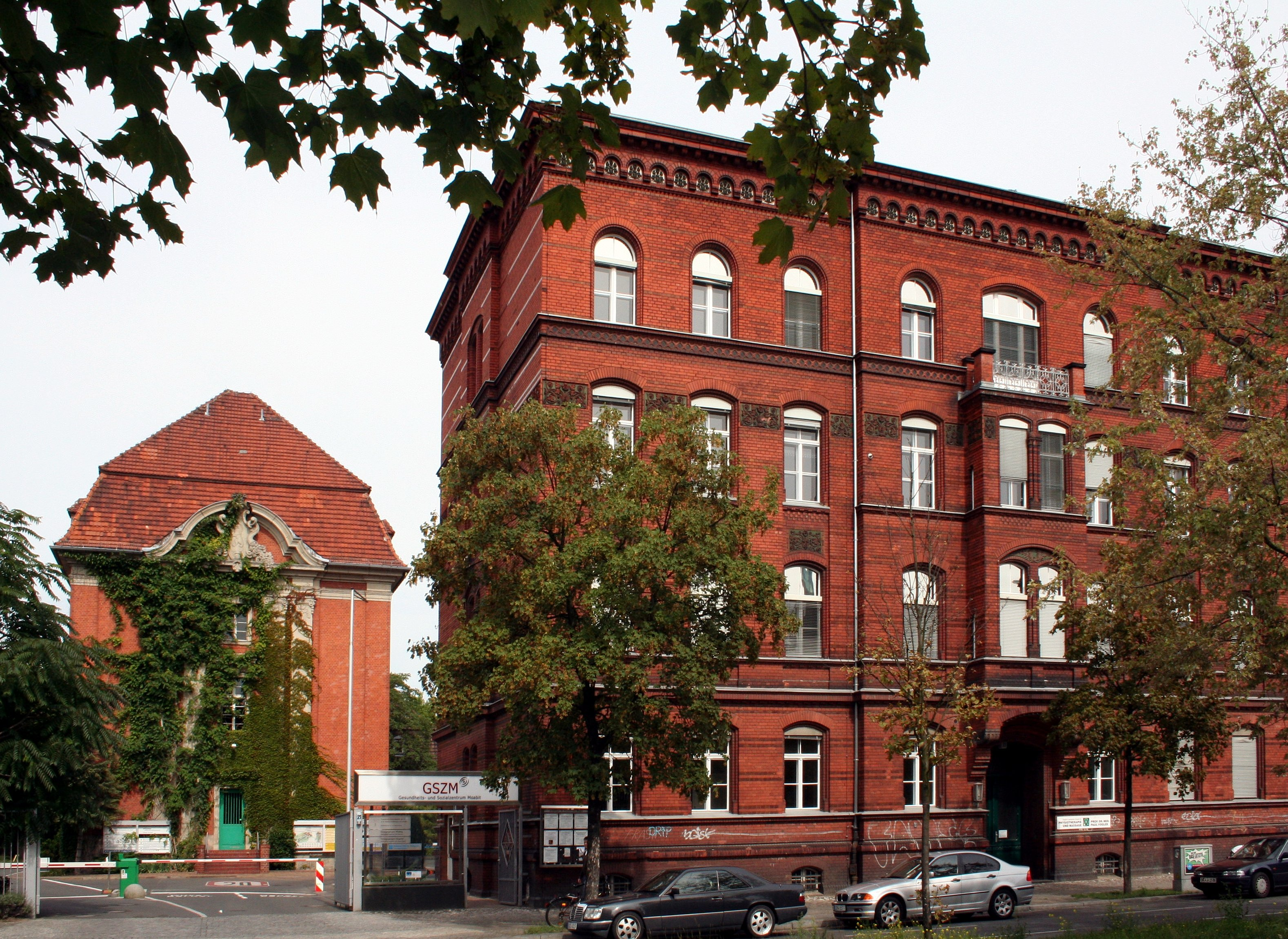
Moabit Hospital, Haupteingang Turmstraße 21/22

Turmstraße (Tower street) is a main street in the Berlin district of Moabit.

The street runs along the "Kleiner Tiergarten" park, and past the Moabit courthouse.

Turmstraße is also the name of an U-Bahn stop on the U9.

Moabit Courthouse and Moabit Hospital are located over here, as shown in the images on the right.
