= AEG turbine factory =

Factory in Berlin designed by Peter Behrens

Coordinates: 52°31′42″N 13°19′28″E

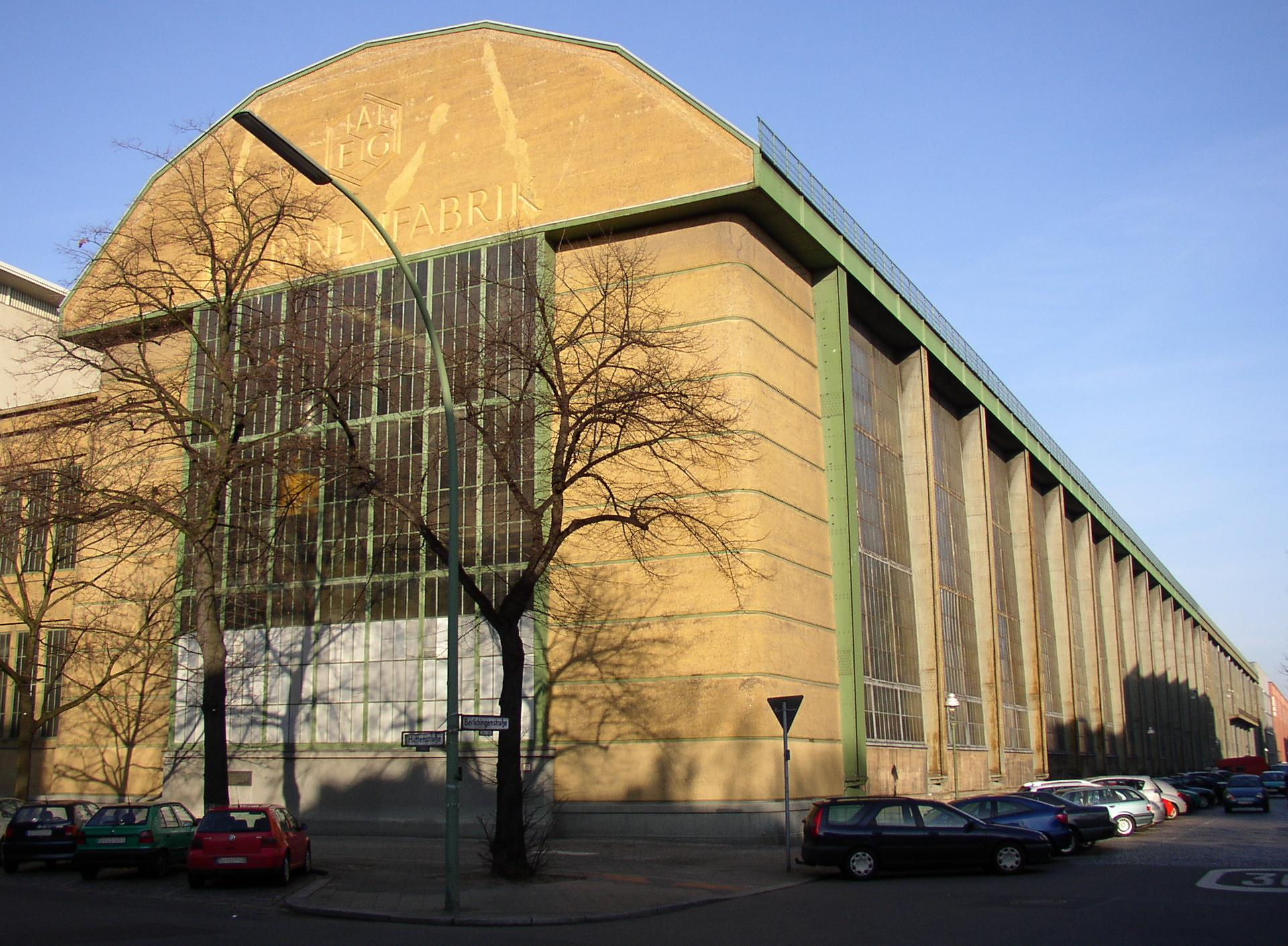
Shape and height of the building axes are given by the three joint ties.

The AEG turbine factory was built in 1909, at Huttenstraße 12–16 in the Moabit district of Berlin. It is the best-known work of architect Peter Behrens. The 100 m long steel-framed building with 15 m tall glass windows on either side is considered the first attempt to introduce restrained modern design to industrial architecture. It was a bold move, and world first that would have a durable impact on architecture as a whole.

== Origin ==
Since 1892, the site was occupied by the Union-Elektricitäts-Gesellschaft (UEG), which was an electrical company founded by August Thyssen and the Thomson Houston Electric Company. The company's goal was to enter the booming electrical industry, and this site was dedicated to the production of electric trams. The UEG quickly encountered financial difficulties, and the Allgemeine Elektricitäts-Gesellschaft (AEG) took over in 1904 and planned the construction of a new turbine factory, as the existing factory had become too small.

Architect Peter Behrens was commissioned with the design of the new building. More than an architect, Behrens was employed by AEG since 1907 as an artistic consultant, and designed the company's electrical products, as well as its logo and other company graphics. He was also in charge of the overall image of the company. Initially influenced by the Art Nouveau in 1901–3, Behrens soon became a founding member of the German Werkbund; influenced by the British Arts and Crafts, they were dedicated to raising the quality of German design, developing architecture that was rational for the modern age, while still embracing classical traditions.

== Construction ==
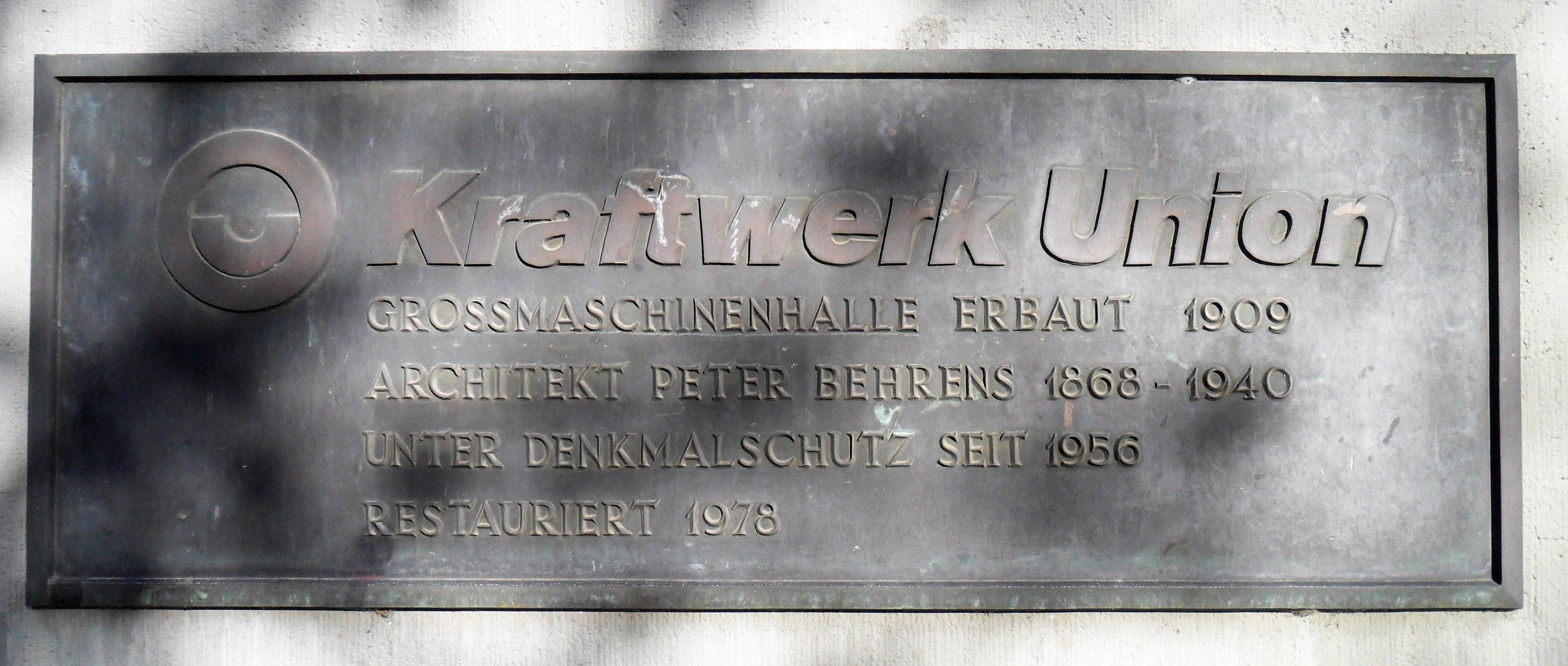
Plaque on the AEG-Turbinenfabrik

The turbine hall was built in 1909 under Peter Behrens as lead architect and engineer Karl Bernhard at the corner of Huttenstraße and Berlichingenstraße streets in Berlin-Moabit. It consists of two parallel spaces, a lower space attached to the west of the main one. The main space is 25.6 m wide (the lower one 12.5 m), with a height of 25 m and a length of 123 m, with a body formed by 22 steel frames, placed every 9 meters. The steel columns appear on the outside unadorned, with bolts and joints visible, with huge glass windows between, angled slightly inwards towards the top. The gable ends are constructed of reinforced concrete, with metal strapping on the piers either side creating a rusticated appearance, and the firm's logo is cast in the concrete of the gable.

In 1939, Jacob Schallberger and Paul Schmidt designed an extension of the hall to the north extending it to 207m. The whole building was developed to function as a production site for turbines. It is now part of Siemens, which still operates a gas turbine plant there. This factory was actually designed with such foresight that it still serves the same purpose of producing turbines, a hundred years later.

== Significance ==
Behrens design referenced the neo-classical, with metal strapping on the piers of the gable end either side creating a rusticated appearance. David Watkin describes it as a "temple of power". Similarly, Tom Wilkinson likens it to an "up-to-date edition of the Parthenon".

Factory design at that time was either steel and glass, or "crenellated castle-cities," with a dowdy coat of historicist design, hiding the technology within it's structure. Peter Behrens created an architecture for industry emerging outside historicist facades for the first time, transformed by a new self-confidence to create a sophisticated image for the public face of the Moabit industrial site.

Franz Hessel wrote, "There is no lovelier building than that monumental hall of glass and reinforced concrete: the Peter Behrens turbine factory on Huttenstrasse."

Since 1956 the building has been classified as a protected historical monument, and it underwent a restoration in 1978. On the south side there is a plaque with information about the construction, architects, and heritage status.
