= Moabit =

- Locality of Berlin
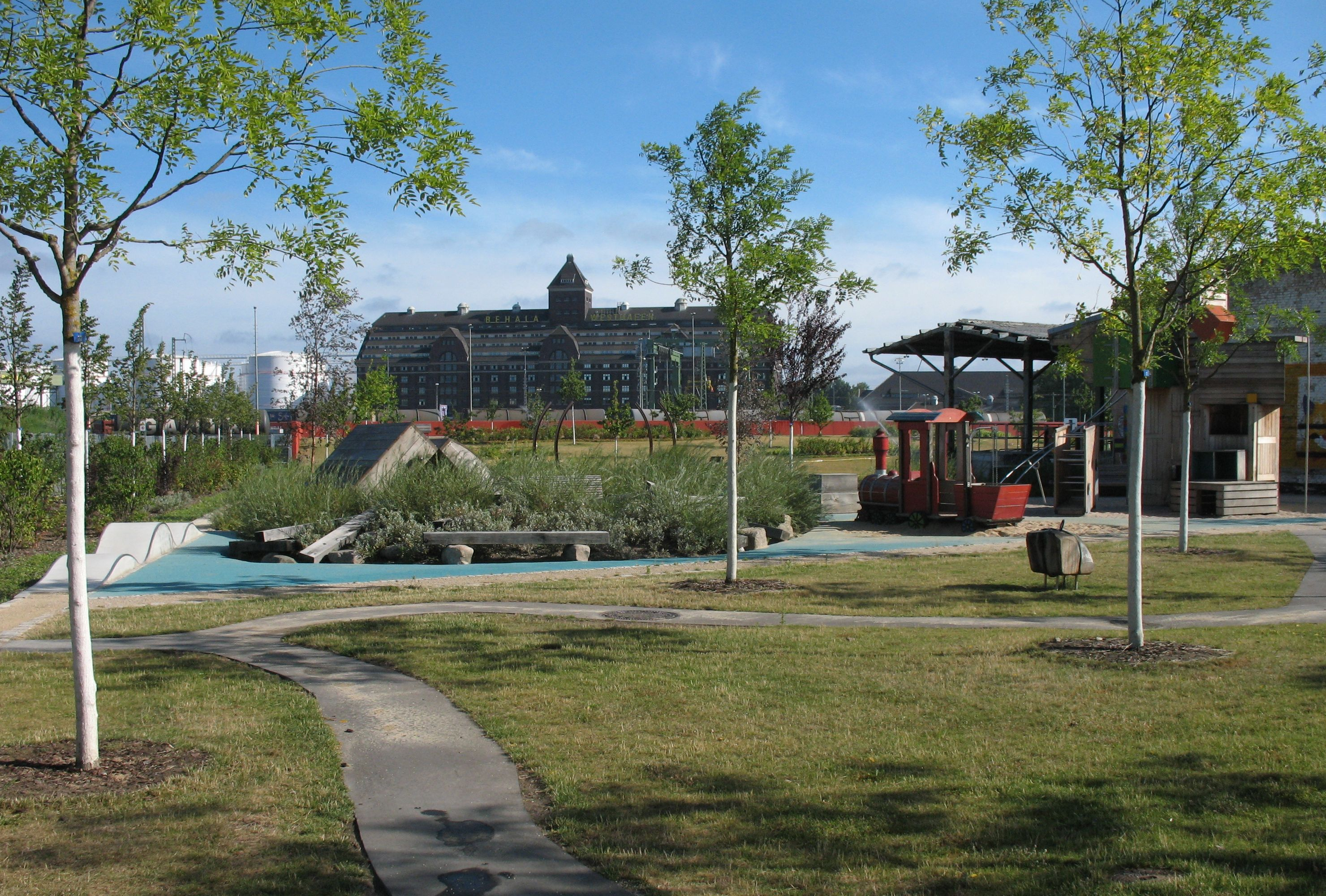
- Stadtteilgarden in Moabit

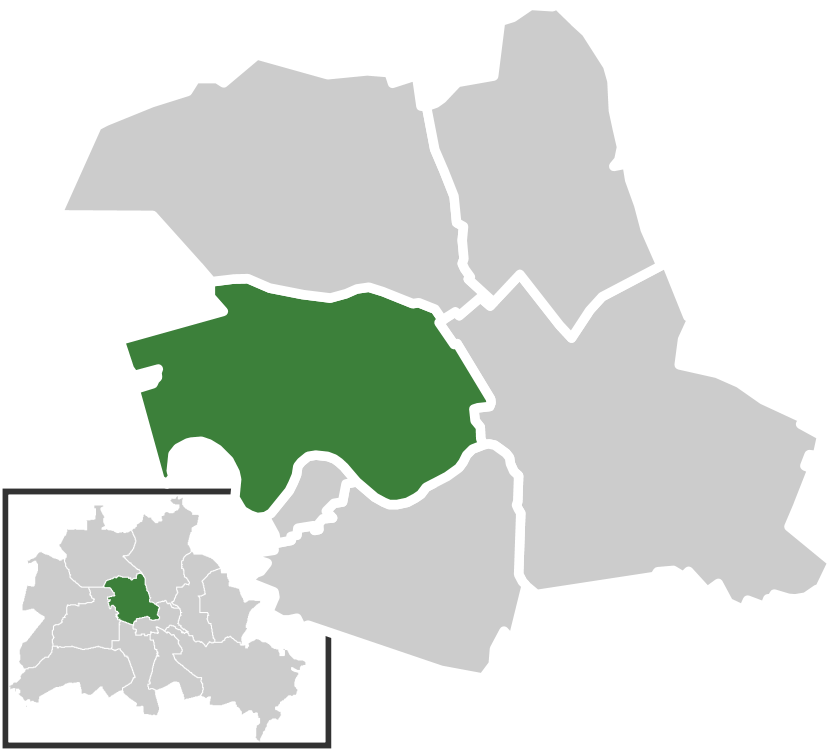
- Location of Moabit in Mitte district and Berlin
- Interactive map of Moabit
- Location within Germany Location within Berlin
- Coordinates: 52°32′00″N 13°20′00″E
- Country: Germany
- State: Berlin
- City: Berlin
- Borough: Mitte
- Founded: 1861

Area
  - Total: 7.72 km^{2} (2.98 sq mi)
- Elevation: 52 m (171 ft)

Population (2024-12-31)
  - Total: 84,490
  - Density: 10,900/km^{2} (28,300/sq mi)
- Time zone: UTC+01:00 (CET)
  - Summer (DST): UTC+02:00 (CEST)
- Postal codes: 10551, 10553, 10555, 10557, 10559
- Vehicle registration: B

Moabit (German: [moaˈbiːt]) is an inner city locality in the borough of Mitte, Berlin, Germany. As of 2022, about 84,000 people lived in Moabit. First inhabited in 1685 and incorporated into Berlin in 1861, the former industrial and working-class neighbourhood is fully surrounded by three watercourses, which define its present-day border. Between 1945 and 1990, Moabit was part of the British sector of West Berlin and directly bordered East Berlin.

Until the administrative reform in 2001, Moabit was a part of the district of Tiergarten.

Colloquially, the name Moabit also refers to the Central Criminal Court (Strafgericht) and detention centre, which deals with all criminal cases in Berlin and is based in Moabit.

== Name ==
The origin of the name Moabit is disputed. According to one account, it can be traced back to the Huguenots, in the time of King Frederick William I of Prussia. These French refugees are said to have named their new residence in reference to the Biblical description of the Israelites in the country of Moab, where they stayed before being allowed to enter Canaan. Other possible origins include the German (Berlin dialect) "Moorjebiet" (swamp area).

== History ==
=== First settlements ===
In the 13th century the waste area along the road to Spandau known as Grosse Stadtheide ("great city heath") was a hunting ground of the electors of Brandenburg. Settlement began in 1685 with the erection of the Staakensetzerhaus at the western border of what is now Moabit. 1716 saw the formation of the colony of Old Moabit by the Huguenots, who were meant to cultivate white mulberry trees for silkworms, but failed because of the low soil quality.

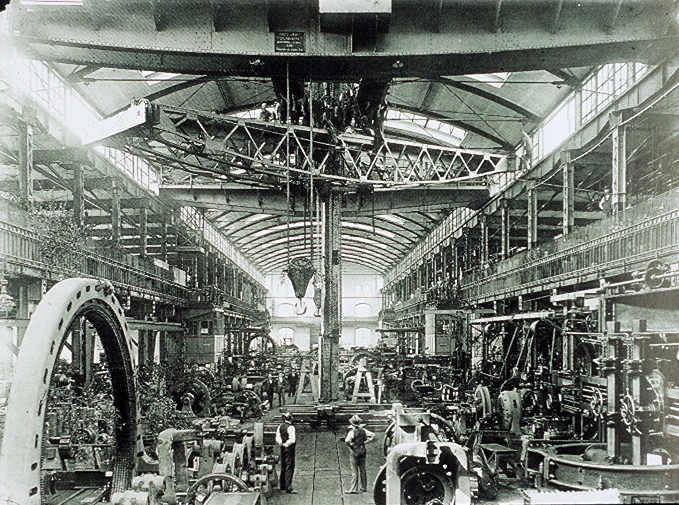
The AEG turbine factory in 1900 – an example of Moabit's industrial past

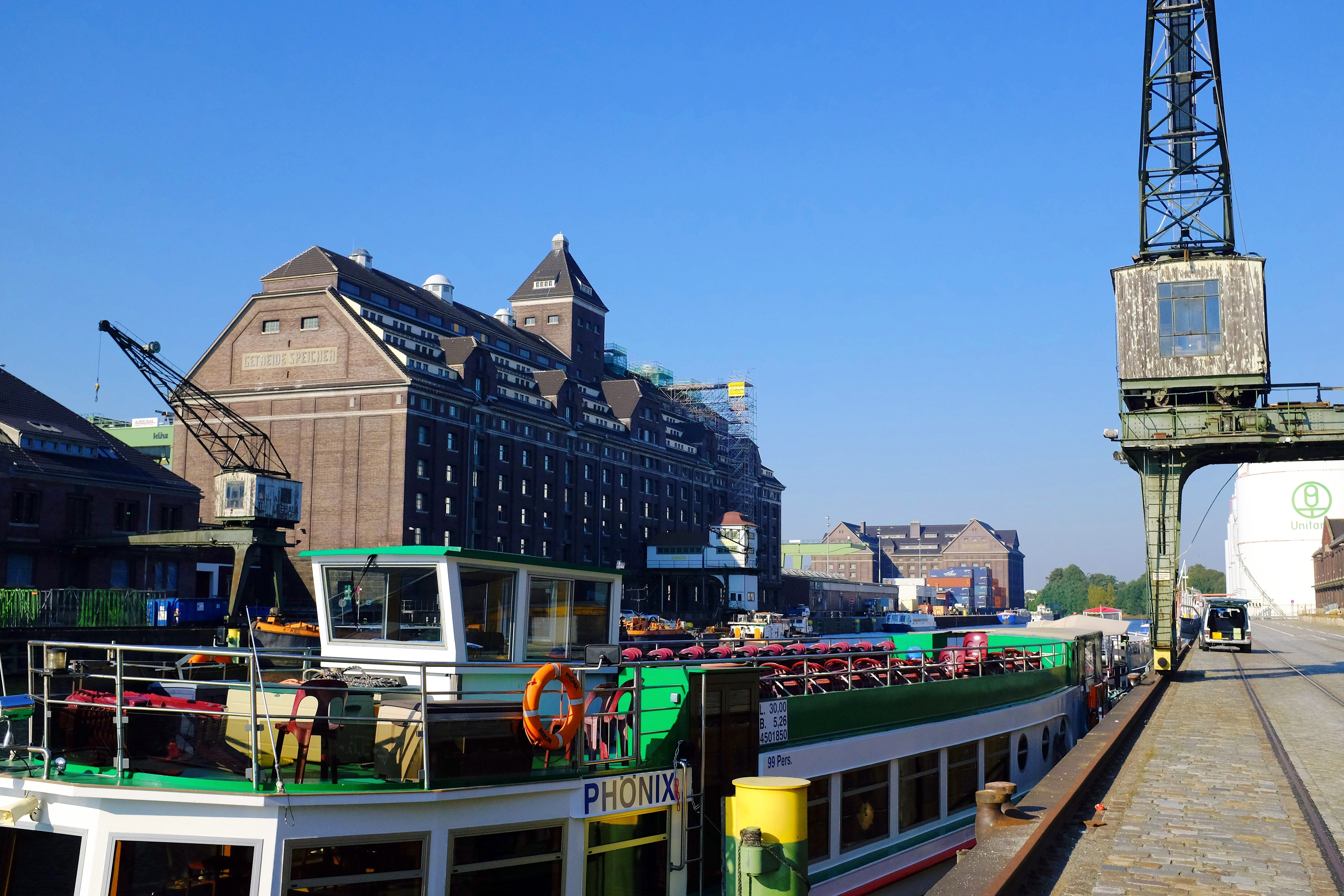
Berlin's largest inland port marks Moabit's northern border with Wedding.

=== Industrialization ===
In 1818 New Moabit was founded and grew together with Old Moabit to an industrial suburb district, which was incorporated into the city of Berlin in 1861. The industrialization started in 1820 when, with the financial support of court counsellor Baillif, a simple bridge was built to connect the island to the Berlin mainland. The bridge was followed by factories, a power plant, the Berlin-Spandau Canal, the Westhafen port and the Hamburger Bahnhof train station which connected Berlin with Hamburg. A network of streets was laid out in the Hobrecht-Plan in an area that came to be known architecturally as the Wilhelmine Ring. All of that activity resulted in an exponential growth of the population and the subsequent construction of tenements in Moabit and neighbouring Wedding, facilitating the spread of a smallpox epidemic.

In consequence, Berlin's city council, exhorted to do so by Rudolf Virchow, built a second hospital (after the Charité), the Krankenhaus Moabit in 1872. In the 1880s, Robert Koch worked here on the sterilization of surgical instruments and the isolation of the tuberculosis bacterium. A teaching hospital from 1920 on, the Krankenhaus Moabit employed notable physicians like the Nobel Laureate Werner Forssmann, Lydia Rabinowitsch-Kempner and the resistance fighter Georg Groscurth.

A first prison, the Zellengefängnis (Cell Prison) on Lehrter Strasse was built between 1842 and 1849 by order of King Frederick William IV of Prussia, according to the "separate system" of Pentonville Prison. In 1878 Max Hödel, who had shot at Emperor Wilhelm I of Germany, was beheaded here. Political activists like Karl Radek, Erich Mühsam, Werner Scholem and Musa Cälil were detained in Moabit. Wilhelm Voigt, the "Hauptmann von Köpenick", and the writer Wolfgang Borchert served their prison sentences in the prison.

The vast building of the Criminal Court on Turmstraße was erected in 1906. In 1909, architect Peter Behrens built the AEG's Turbine factory at the north-western Huttenstraße, one of the first works of Modern architecture.

=== Labour movement and war period ===
Large parts of Moabit are traditional working-class residential areas. Some areas were known for their political activity during the Nazi era, such as the Red Beusselkiez or the neighbouring Rostock Kiez. After the Nazi Machtergreifung in 1933 they were considered Communist resistance cells.

On 11 April 1928, during the Weimar Republic, the 20-year-old Communist activist Olga Benário and several of her comrades managed to break into Moabit's prison and free the incarcerated Otto "Li De" Braun, a prominent party member and at the time Benario's lover. Despite being hotly hunted, the two lovers succeeded in escaping to Moscow and later rose (separately) to prominence in the International Communist movement (in Brazil and China respectively).

Between 1941 and 1945, around 1900 Jews were deported predominantly to Auschwitz, Theresienstadt or Minsk. Approximately as many survived by escaping abroad.

=== Post-war and modern days ===
After the war, between 1945 and 1990, Moabit was part of the British sector of West Berlin. Due to its new peripheral location adjacent to the Berlin Wall, Moabit became a remote neighbourhood. Similar to Kreuzberg, it attracted mostly immigrants due to its low rents. With the fall of the Berlin Wall, Moabit's location has anew changed to its former centrality. Post-reunification, Moabit has faced problems such as drug trafficking and abuse (especially around Kleiner Tiergarten), poverty (most notably in its Western parts), and crime. Similar to neighbouring Wedding, lower rents have recently attracted artists and young people, and there are first unmistakable signs of gentrification.

At Moabit's eastern edge, bordering Mitte, Berlin's new Central Railway Station was opened in 2006 on the grounds of the old Lehrter Bahnhof. The adjacent neoclassical Hamburger Bahnhof former train station now serves as Berlin's contemporary art museum, the Museum für Gegenwart. South of the Central Station, the German government district has expanded across the Spree into Moabit. North of the Central Station, the Europacity urban development area is centered around Heidestraße.

The Center for Art and Urbanism (ZK/U) is located on the grounds of the Stadtgarten Moabit, in the former Berlin-Moabit freight station.

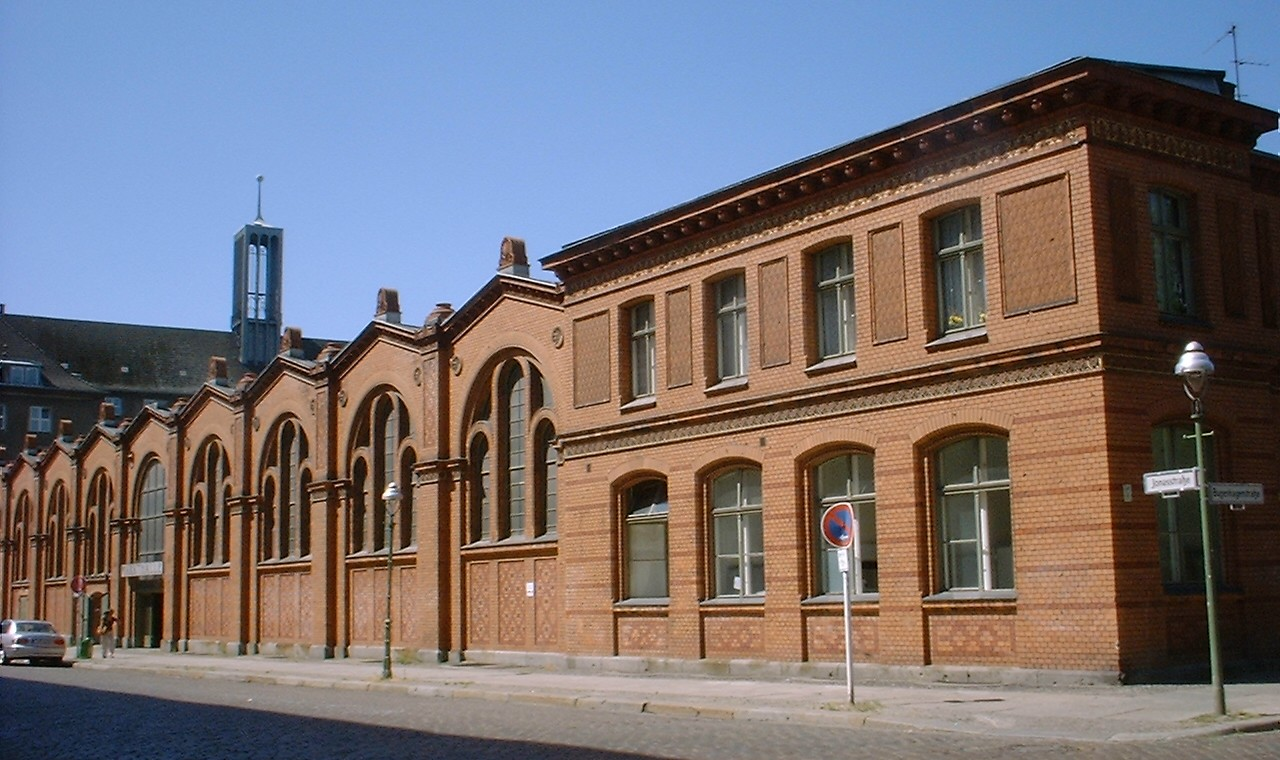
Moabit's Markthalle X, one of the few remaining Berlin market halls, erected 1891

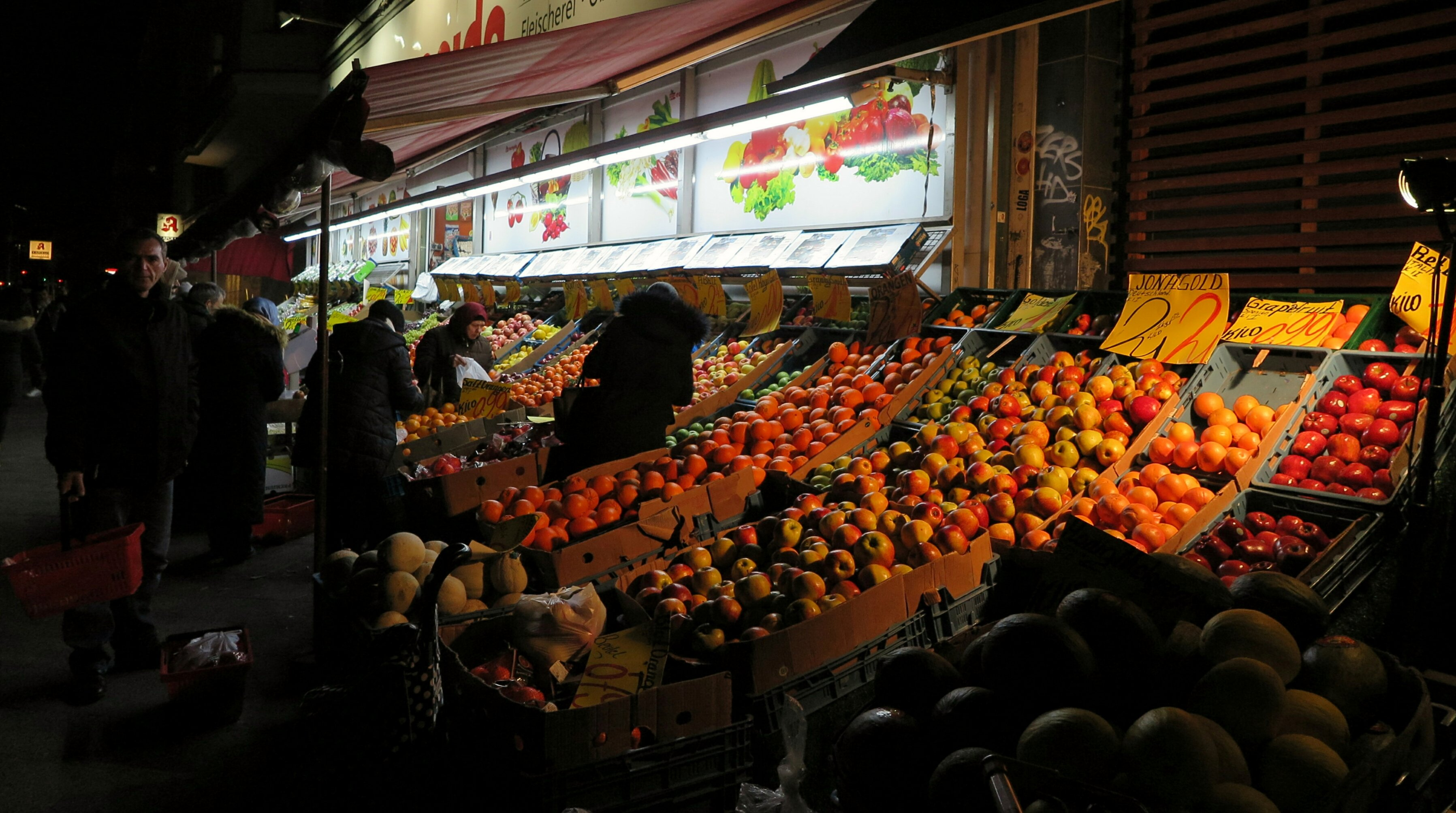
Moabit's Turmstraße is home to a large Turkish population.

== Demographics ==
For a long time, Moabit was sparsely inhabited. Its population grew considerably after its incorporation into Berlin in 1861:

- 1801: 120 inhabitants
- 1805: 201 inhabitants
- 1861: 6,534 inhabitants
- 1871: 14,818 inhabitants
- 1880: 29,693 inhabitants
- 1910: c. 190,000 inhabitants
- 2006: 75,181 inhabitants
- 2018: 78,491 inhabitants
- 2022: 81,148 inhabitants

Moabit's modern-day population is among Berlin's most diverse. As of 2022, out of 84,148 inhabitants, 29,533 (35.10%) were non-German citizens. 46,113 (54.80%) had a migration background, making it one of the highest percentages alongside Gesundbrunnen, Neukölln, Kreuzberg and Wedding.

== Notable people ==
- Kurt Tucholsky, journalist, born 9 January 1890 in Moabit, Lübecker Straße 13, died 21 December 1935 in Gothenburg, Sweden
- Farin Urlaub, lead singer of German punk rock band Die Ärzte, born 27 October 1963 in Moabit
- In 1968/69 Uschi Obermaier and the members of the Kommune 1 lived in Moabit, Stephanstraße 60
- Sawsan Chebli, politician, born 1978 in Moabit

== In popular culture ==
Moabit is mentioned in countless books and films taking place in Germany or Berlin, primarily in reference to criminal court cases or incarcerations at the Central Criminal Court (Kriminalgericht) and detention centre. The district features briefly in Jonathan Franzen's 2015 novel Purity and also extensively in Dan Fesperman's 2018 novel Safe Houses.

The Berlin-based band No Nebraska! released a song entitled "Moabit is an Island" on their EP "Serves Six" in 2007.

== Literature ==
- Saeger, Olaf, Moabiter Details – Schatten im Paradies, Berlin 1995, ISBN 3-925191-59-3

== See also ==
- Kulturfabrik Moabit
