= Architecture of Berlin =

Overview of the architecture in Berlin

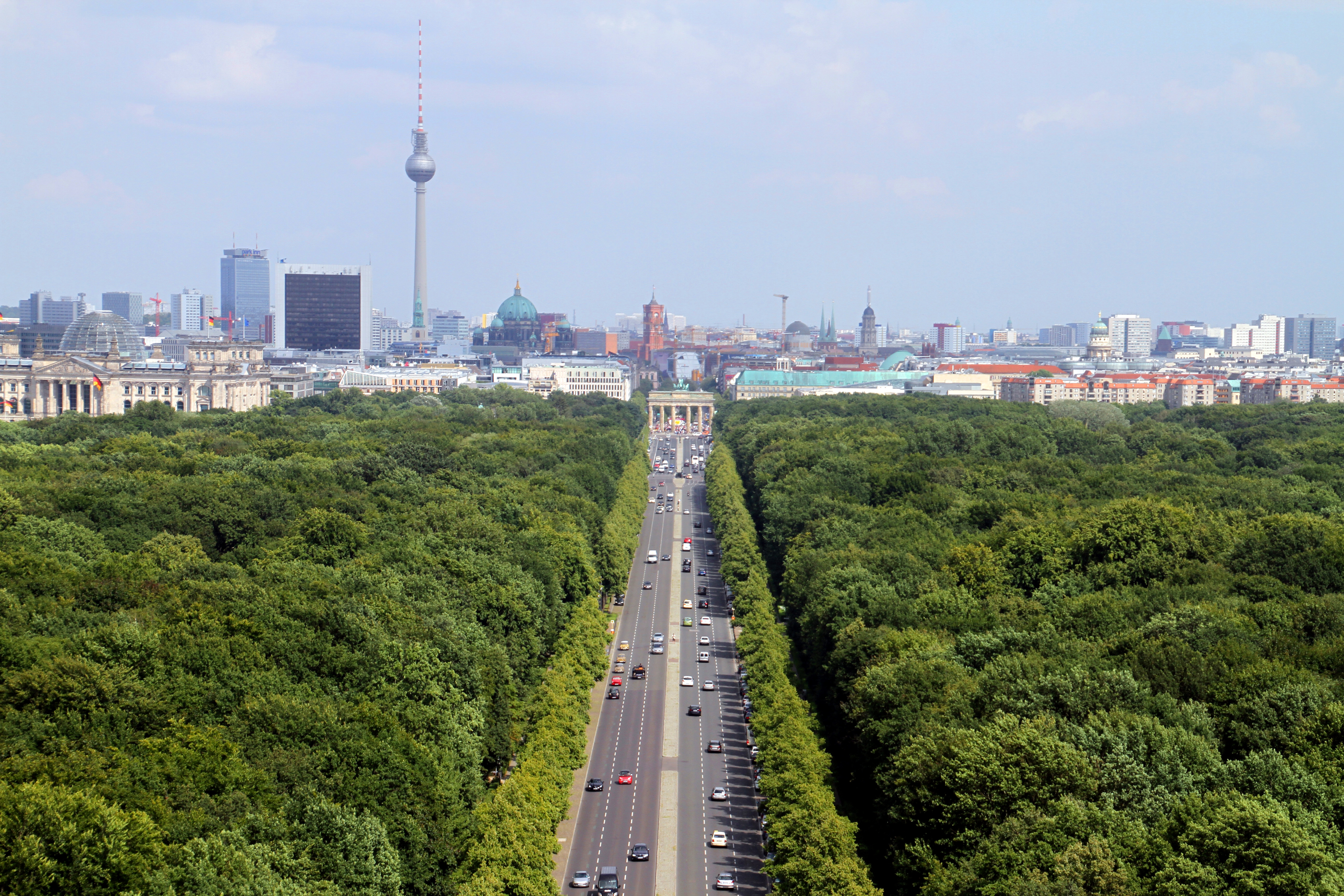
Skyline of Berlin in 2017

Berlin's history has left the city with an eclectic assortment of architecture. The city's appearance in the 21st century has been shaped by the key role the city played in Germany's history during the 19th and 20th-century.

Each of the governments based in Berlin—the Kingdom of Prussia, the 1871 German Empire, the Weimar Republic, Nazi Germany, East Germany and the reunified Federal Republic of Germany—initiated ambitious construction programs, with each adding its distinct flavour to the city's architecture.

== History ==
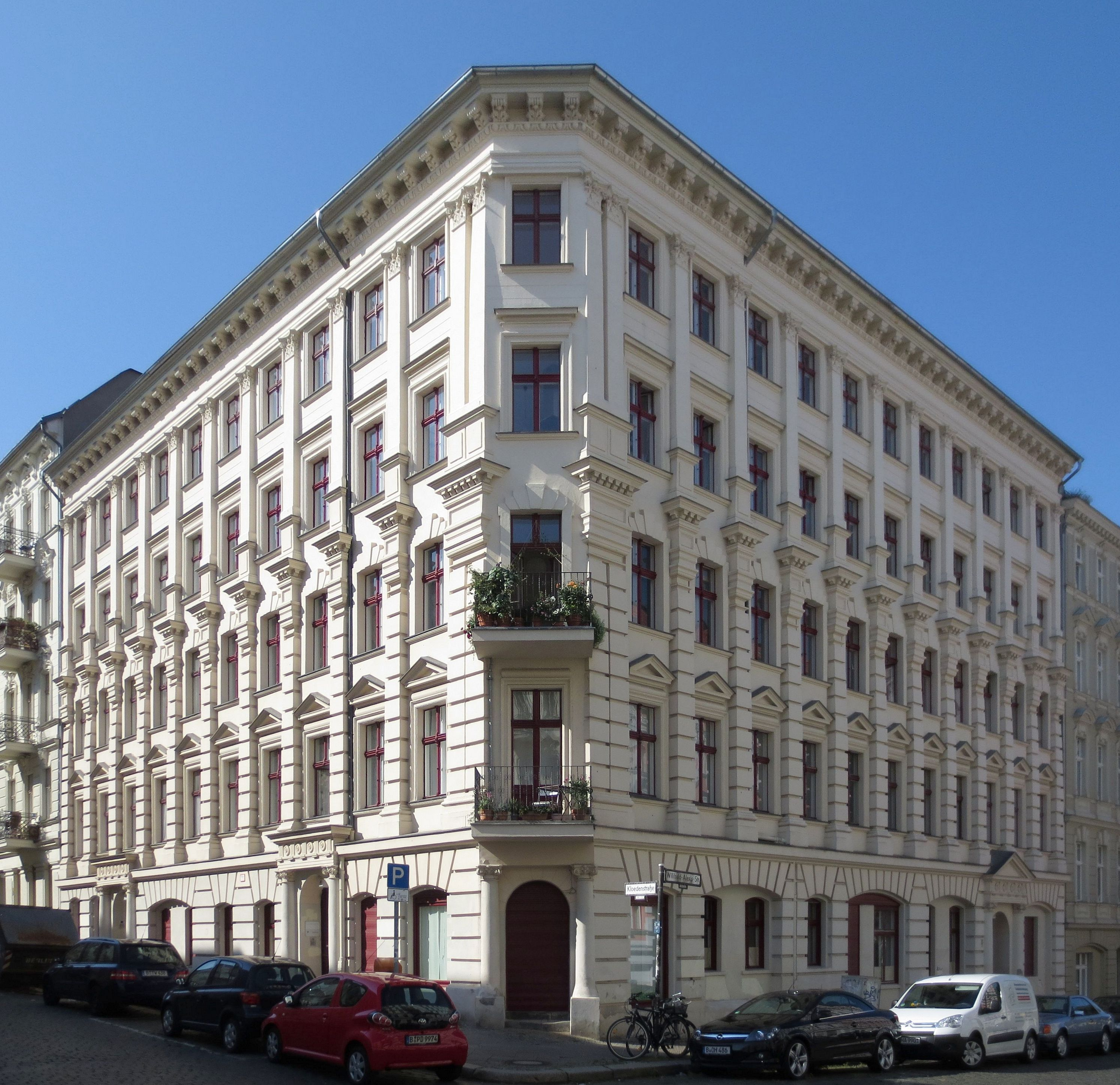
Residential block from the Gründerzeit period in Kreuzberg, built in 1890.

Seventeen percent of Berlin's buildings date from the Gründerzeit period or earlier, and nearly 25 percent were built in the 1920s and 1930s, when the city played a role in the development of modern architecture, including the Berlin Modernism Housing Estates.

Berlin was heavily bombed during World War II, and many buildings that survived the war were later demolished during the 1950s and 1960s. Much of this demolition was carried out through municipal programmes for new housing, commercial development and road construction.

Eastern Berlin contains many Plattenbauten, large-panel residential buildings associated with Eastern Bloc planned housing areas. These developments were often designed with shops and schools in proportions linked to the number of residents. According to architect David Chipperfield, the plain appearance of Plattenbau housing may have limited gentrification pressures and helped preserve social continuity in some local neighbourhoods.

Continuing construction and redevelopment have made Berlin a city frequently described as a "work in progress", including in the mid-2010s.

== Fernsehturm ==
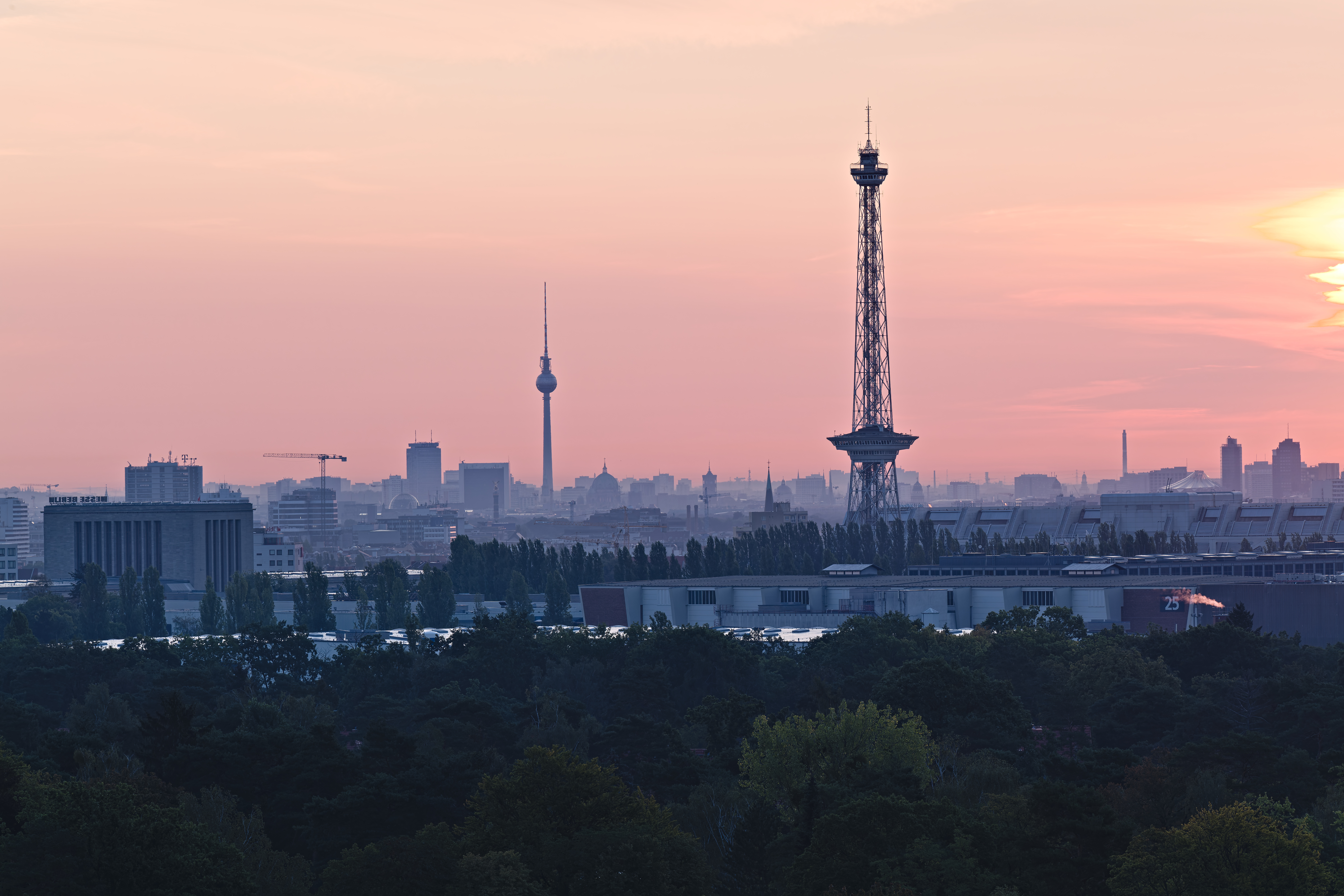
Berlin TV tower and Funkturm (right)

The Fernsehturm (TV tower), at Alexanderplatz in Mitte, is among the tallest structures in the European Union at 368 meters (1,207 ft). Built in 1969, it can be seen from many of Berlin's central districts, and the city may be viewed from its 204-metre (669 ft)-high observation floor. From here the Karl-Marx-Allee, lined with monumental residential buildings from the Stalin era, heads east. Adjacent to this area is the Rotes Rathaus (City Hall), with its distinctive red-brick architecture. In front of City Hall is the Neptunbrunnen, a fountain featuring a mythological group of Tritons (personifications of the four main Prussian rivers) under Neptune.

== Gendarmenmarkt ==
The Gendarmenmarkt, a neoclassical square in Berlin named for the quarters of the 18th-century Gens d'armes regiment located in the city, is bordered by two similarly designed cathedrals: the Französischer Dom, with its observation platform, and the Deutscher Dom. The Konzerthaus (Concert Hall), home of the Berlin Symphony Orchestra, stands between the two cathedrals.

== Museum Island ==
Museum Island, in the River Spree, houses five museums built between 1830 and 1930 and was named a UNESCO World Heritage site in 1999. Restoration and construction of a main entrance to all of the city's museums and the reconstruction of the Berlin Palace (Stadtschloss) on the island has cost over two billion euros since Germany's reunification.

Adjacent to the Lustgarten and palace on the island is Berlin Cathedral, emperor William II's ambitious attempt to create a Protestant counterpart to St. Peter's Basilica in Rome. A large crypt houses the remains of some of the early Prussian royal family. The church is now owned by the Protestant umbrella Union of Evangelical Churches (UEK). Like many other buildings, it suffered extensive damage during the Second World War and required restoration. Berlin's best-preserved church, the medieval Church of St. Mary's, is the first preaching venue—Kaiser Wilhelm Memorial Church is the second—of the Bishop of the Evangelical Church of Berlin-Brandenburg-Silesian Upper Lusatia (EKBO, a Protestant regional church body). St. Hedwig's Cathedral is Berlin's Roman Catholic cathedral.

== Unter den Linden ==
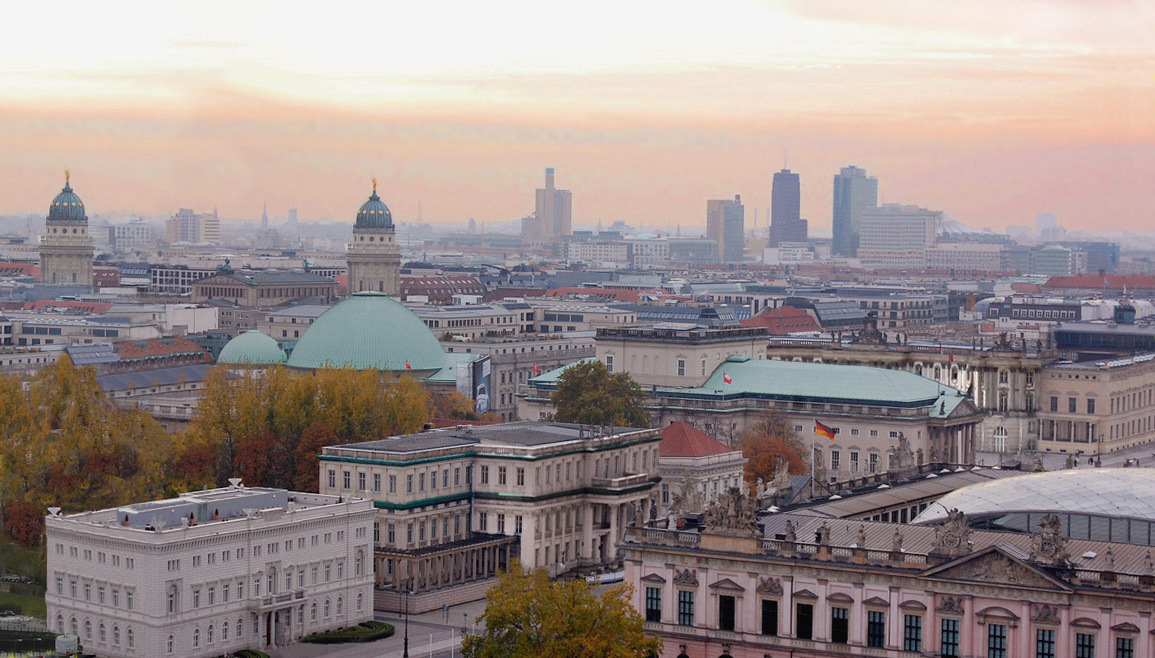
Central Berlin

Unter den Linden is a tree-lined east–west avenue from the Brandenburg Gate to the Berlin Palace (Berliner Stadtschloss), and was Berlin's premier promenade. Many classical buildings line the street, and part of Humboldt University is located there. Friedrichstraße was Berlin's legendary street during the Roaring Twenties, and combines 20th-century tradition with modern Berlin architecture.

== Brandenburg Gate ==
The Brandenburg Gate

The Brandenburg Gate is an iconic landmark of Berlin and Germany which appears on Germany's euro coins (10-cent, 20-cent and 50-cent). The Reichstag building is the traditional seat of the German Parliament, which was renovated during the 1950s after severe World War II damage. The building was again remodeled by British architect Norman Foster during the 1990s and features a glass dome over the session area, which allows free public access to parliamentary proceedings and a view of the city.

== Potsdamer Platz ==
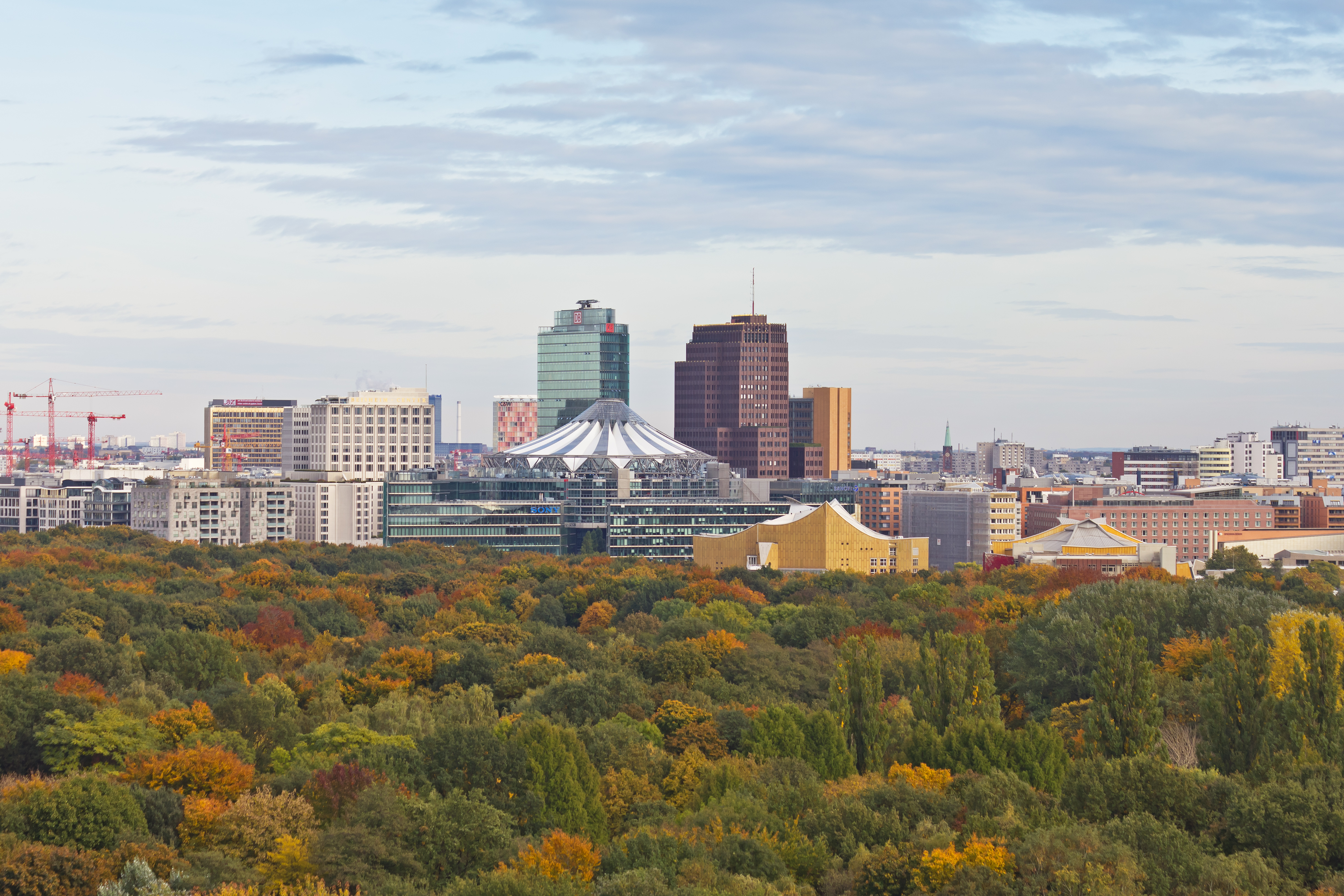
Potsdamer Platz

Potsdamer Platz is a quarter built after 1995, following the demolition of the Berlin Wall. To the west is the Kulturforum, housing the Gemäldegalerie and flanked by the Neue Nationalgalerie and the Berliner Philharmonie. The Memorial to the Murdered Jews of Europe, a Holocaust memorial, is to the north.

== East Side Gallery ==
The East Side Gallery is an open-air exhibition of art painted directly on the last existing portions of the Berlin Wall. It is the largest remaining evidence of the city's historical division, and was restored in 2008–2009.

== Hackescher Markt ==
The area around Hackescher Markt is a fashion and cultural base with clothing outlets, clubs, bars and galleries. It includes the Hackesche Höfe, a collection of buildings around courtyards which was rebuilt around 1996. Oranienburger Straße and the nearby New Synagogue were centers of Jewish culture before 1933. Although the New Synagogue is still an anchor for Jewish history and culture, Oranienburger straße and its surrounding area are better known for shopping and nightlife.

== Nikolaiviertel ==
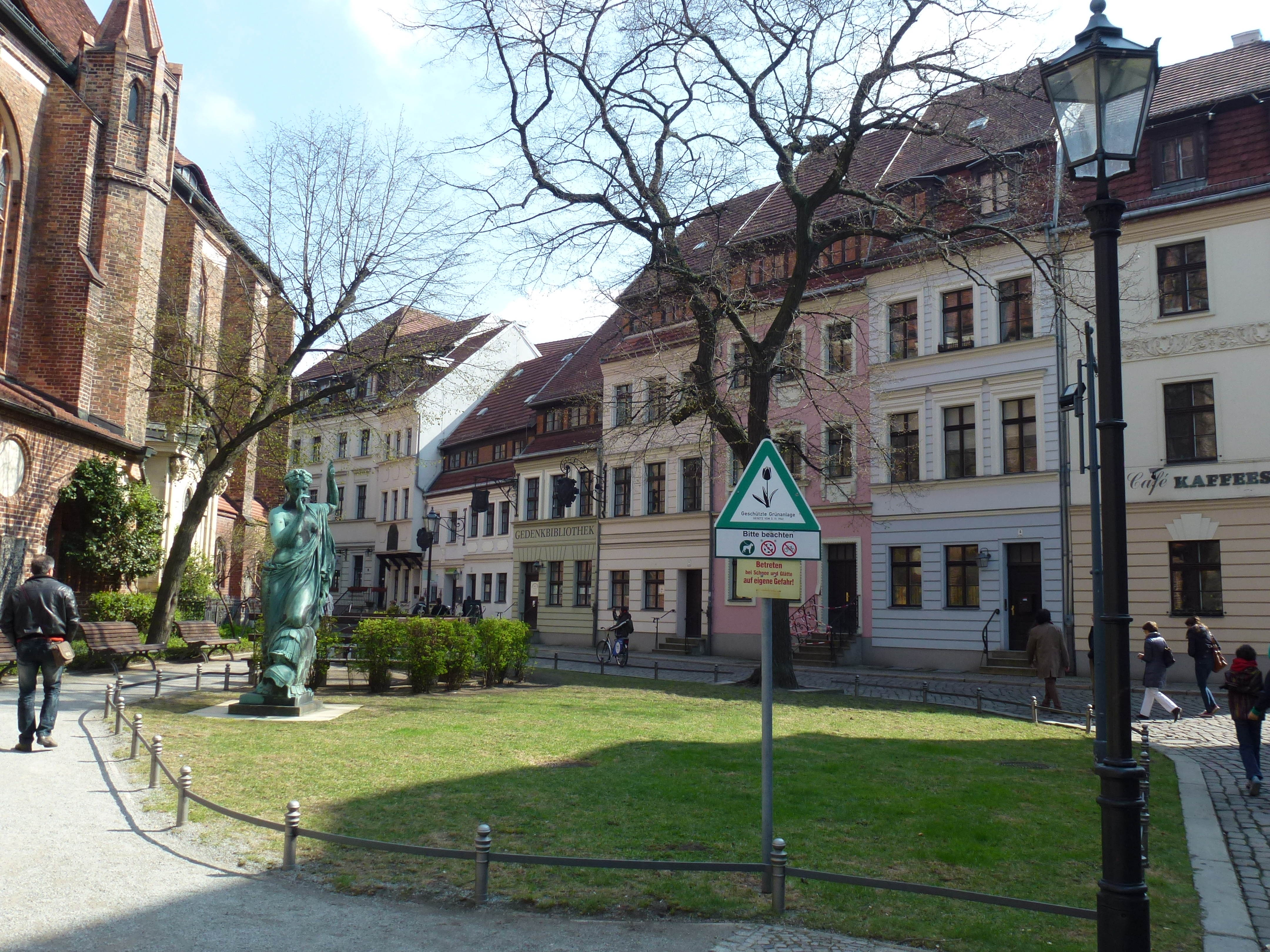
Nikolaiviertel

The Nikolaiviertel (Nikolai Quarter) in Berlin's Mitte district is the oldest residential area in the capital. Almost completely destroyed during the Second World War, it was rebuilt between 1980 and 1987 on behalf of the East Berlin magistrate to mark the city's 750th anniversary. Around the reconstructed Nikolaikirche, a building ensemble of fictitiously arranged town houses in traditional construction and concrete buildings with curtain wall facades was created on an almost original ground plan.

== Straße des 17. Juni ==
The Straße des 17. Juni, connecting the Brandenburg Gate and Ernst-Reuter-Platz, serves as a central east–west axis. Its name commemorates the uprisings in East Berlin of 17 June 1953. About halfway from the Brandenburg Gate is the Großer Stern, a circular traffic island on which the Siegessäule (Victory Column) is situated. This monument, built to commemorate Prussia's victories, was relocated in 1938–1939 from its previous position in front of the Reichstag.

== Kurfürstendamm ==
The Kurfürstendamm is home to some of Berlin's luxurious stores, with the Kaiser Wilhelm Memorial Church at its eastern end on Breitscheidplatz. The church was destroyed during World War II, and left in ruins. Nearby on Tauentzienstraße is KaDeWe, continental Europe's largest department store. The Rathaus Schöneberg, where John F. Kennedy made his "Ich bin ein Berliner!" speech, is located in Tempelhof-Schöneberg.

== Schloss Bellevue ==
West of the city centre, Schloss Bellevue is the residence of the German president. Schloss Charlottenburg was largely destroyed by fire during World War II, and was rebuilt as the largest surviving historical palace in Berlin.

== Funkturm Berlin ==
The Funkturm Berlin is a 150-metre (490 ft)-tall lattice radio tower built between 1924 and 1926. Standing on insulators, it contains a restaurant 55 m (180 ft) and an observation deck 126 m (413 ft) above ground, accessible by a windowed elevator.

== Cube Berlin ==
Cube Berlin is located on Washingtonplatz, which is south of Berlin Central Railway Station, and alongside the Spree Canal. Designed by Danish architecture studio 3XN, led by Torben Østergaard, the 10-storey glass-clad cube-shaped office building was opened in 2020. There is a food market and lobby on the ground floor, and a roof terrace at the top. The solar panels on the roof combine with other elements in the design such as the double-skin facade and cross ventilation to make the building highly energy-efficient.

== Landmarks ==
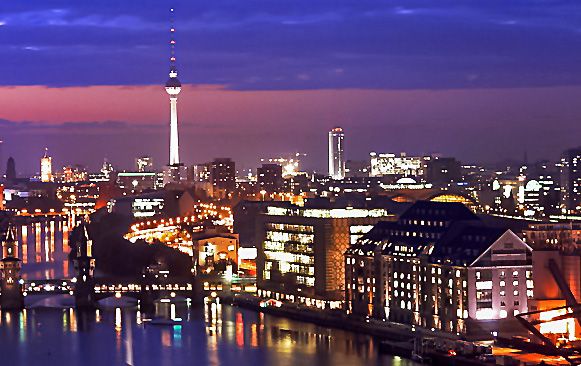
Berlin along the Spree river and the Fernsehturm by night

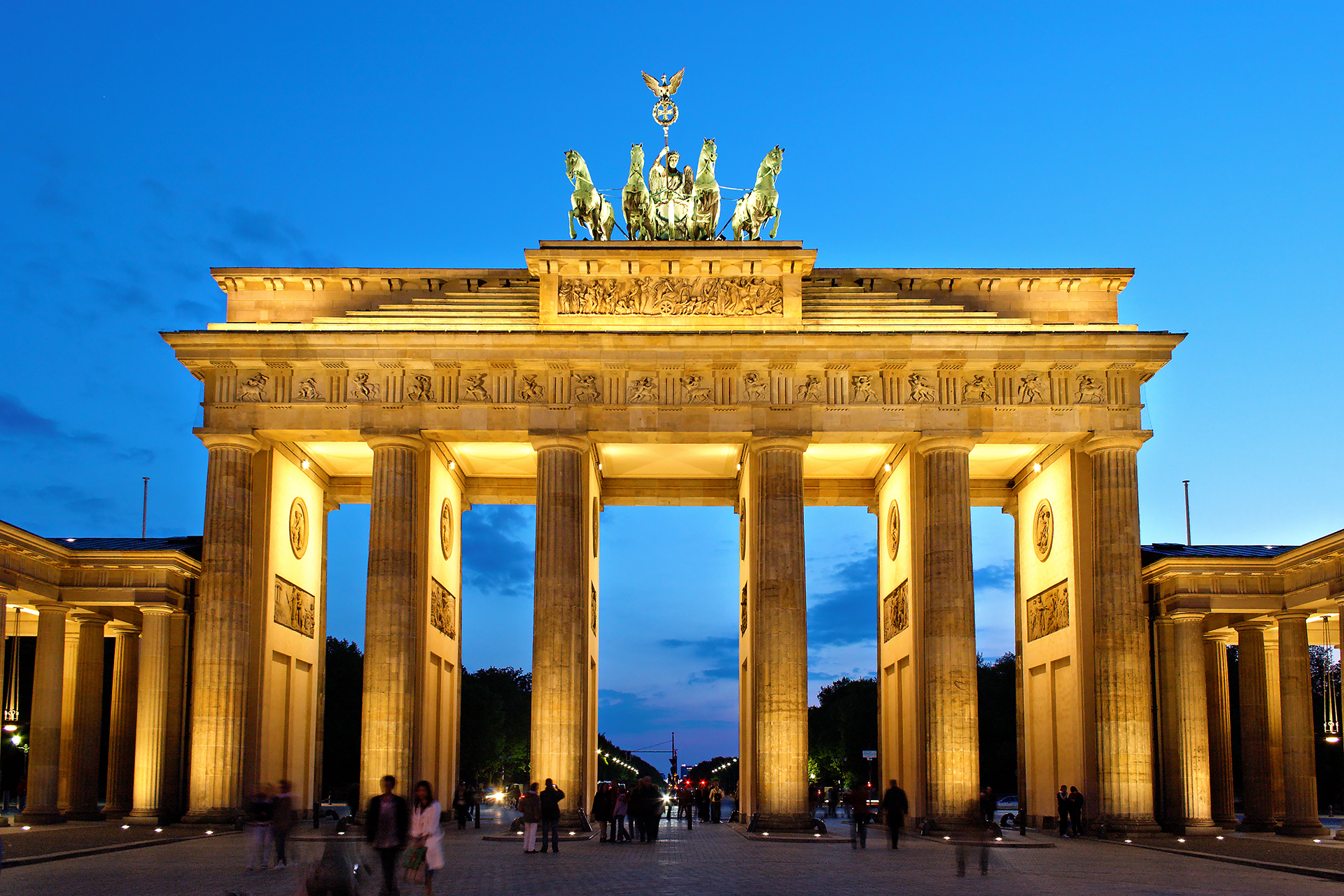
Brandenburg Gate

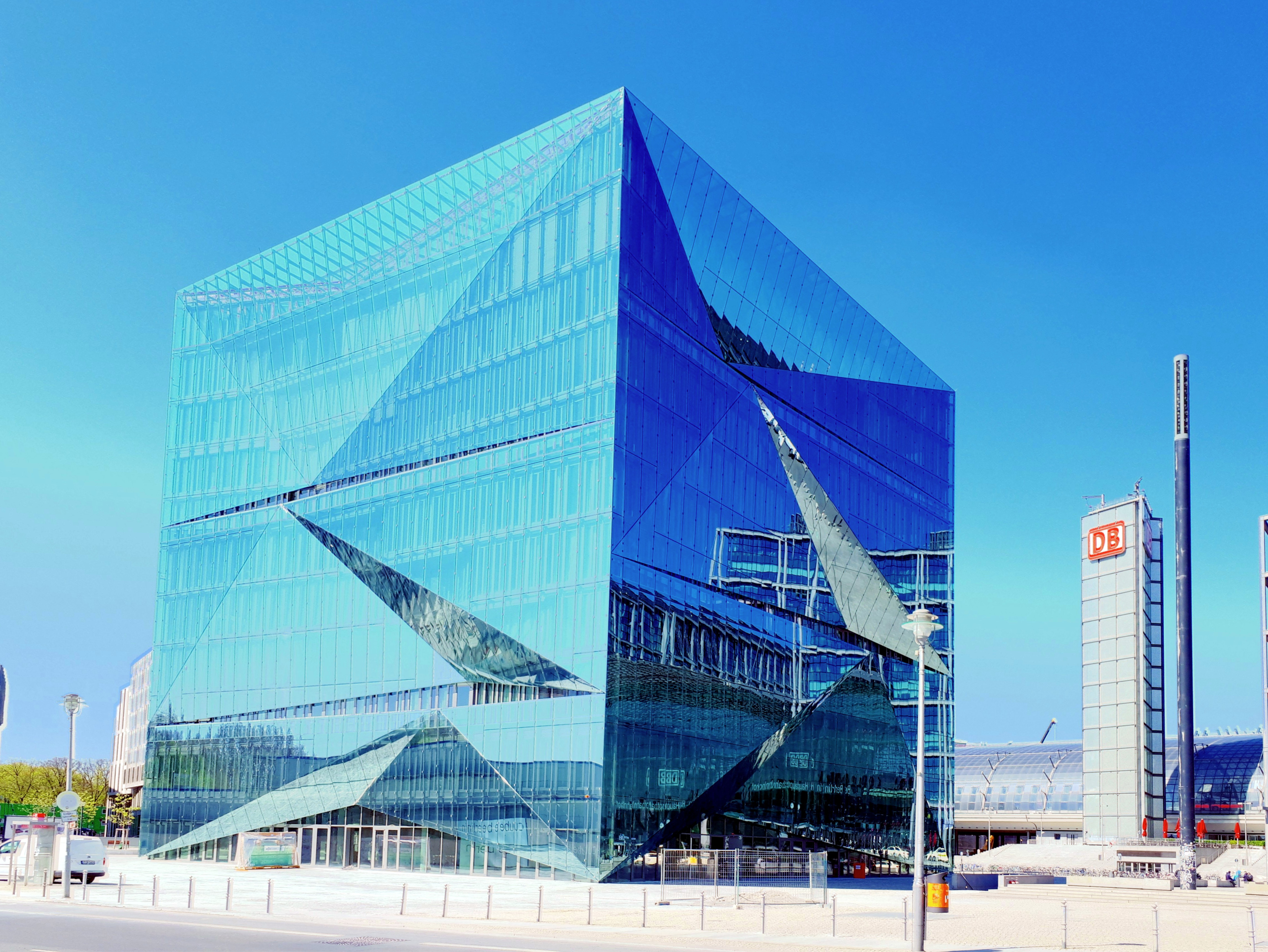
Cube Berlin

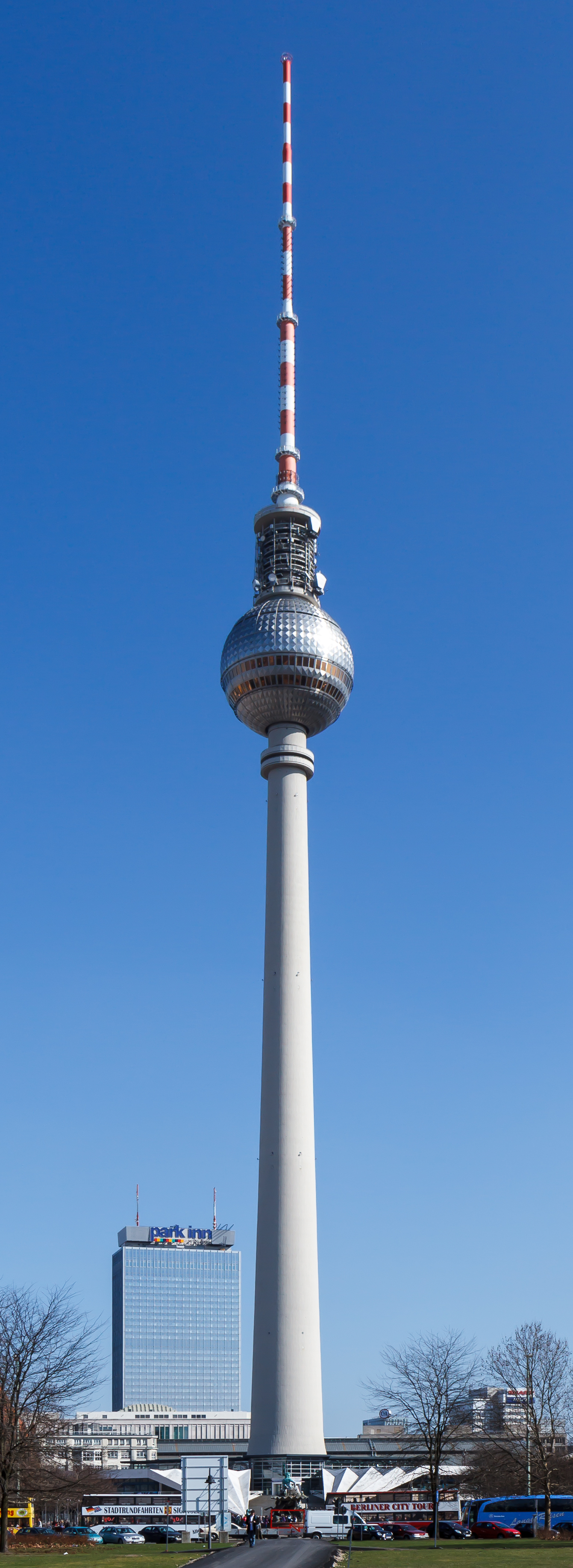
Berlin TV Tower (Fernsehturm)

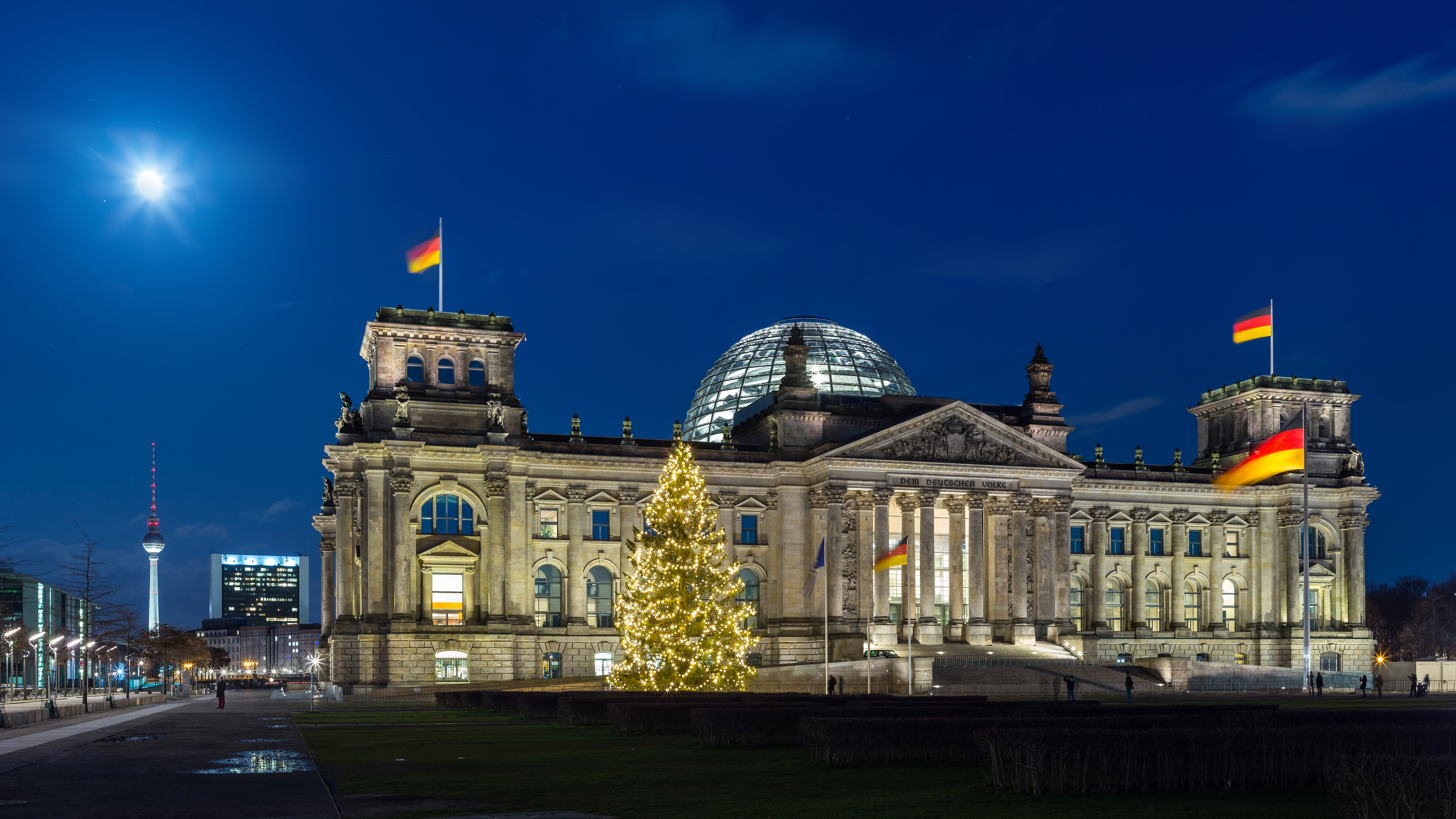
Reichstag building

Schloss Charlottenburg

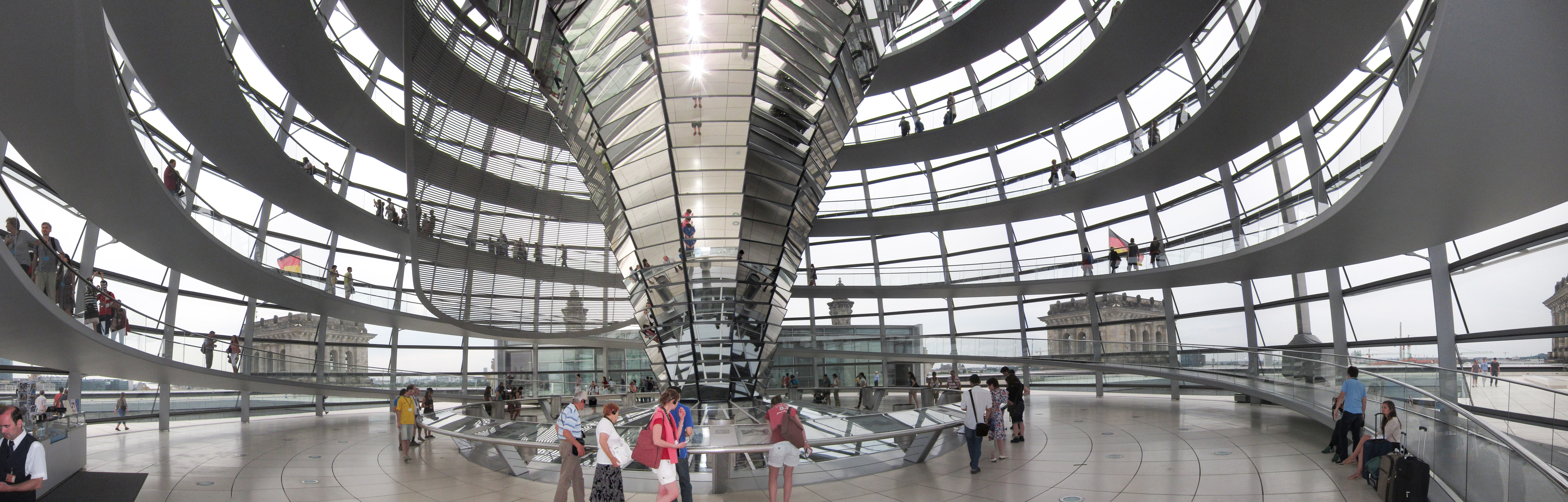
Reichstag dome _{(inside)}

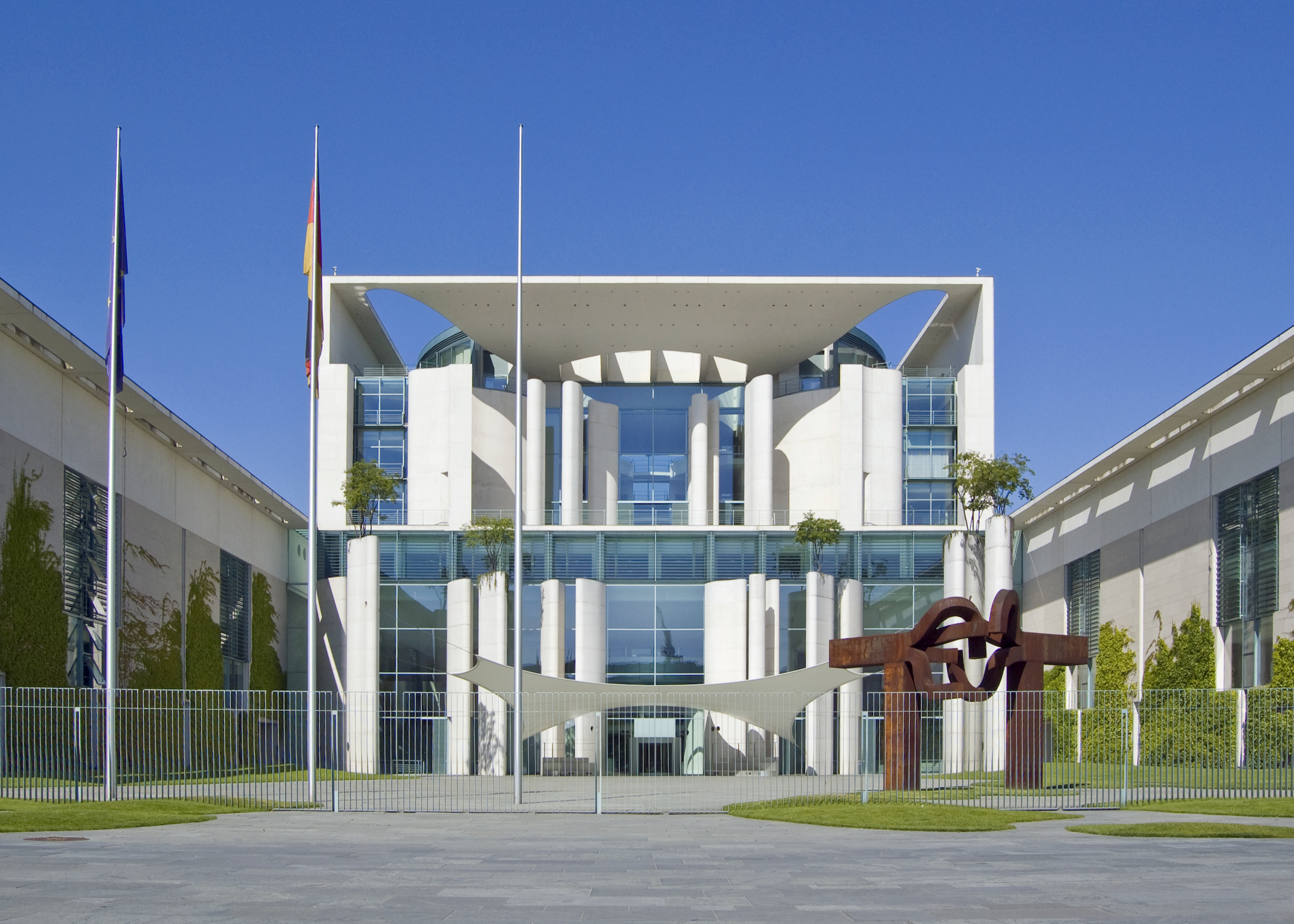
Bundeskanzleramt

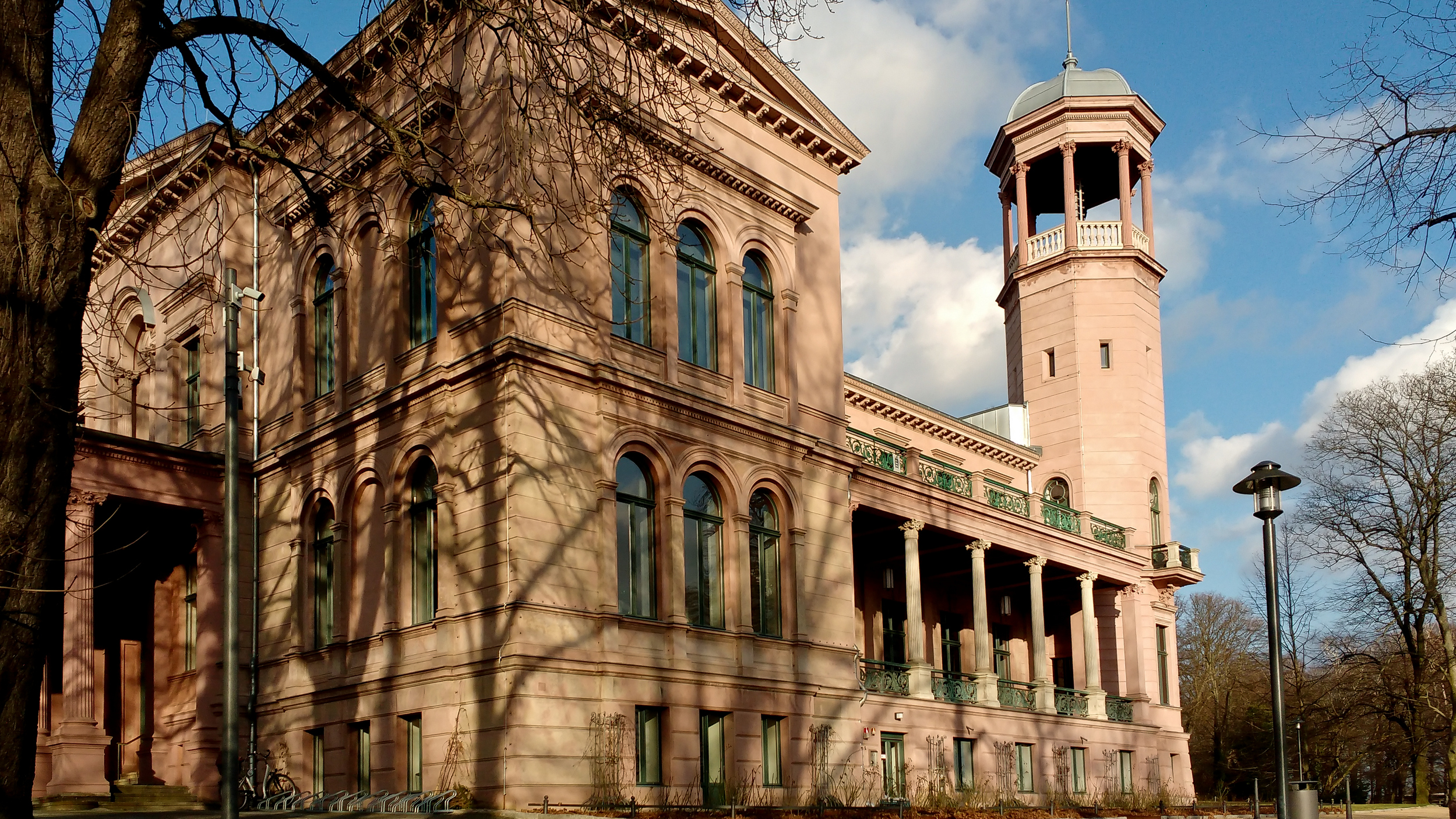
Schloss Biesdorf

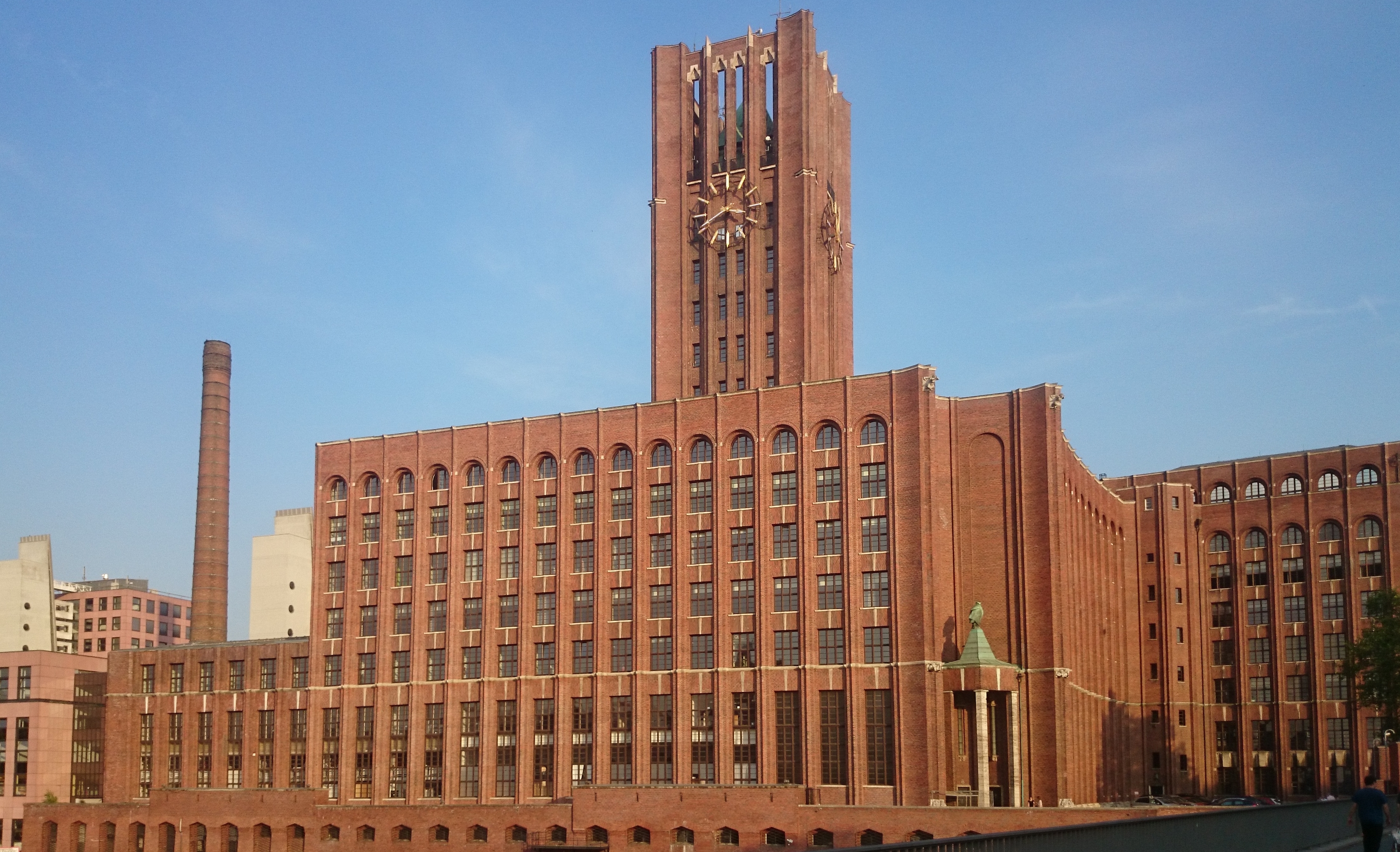
Ullsteinhaus

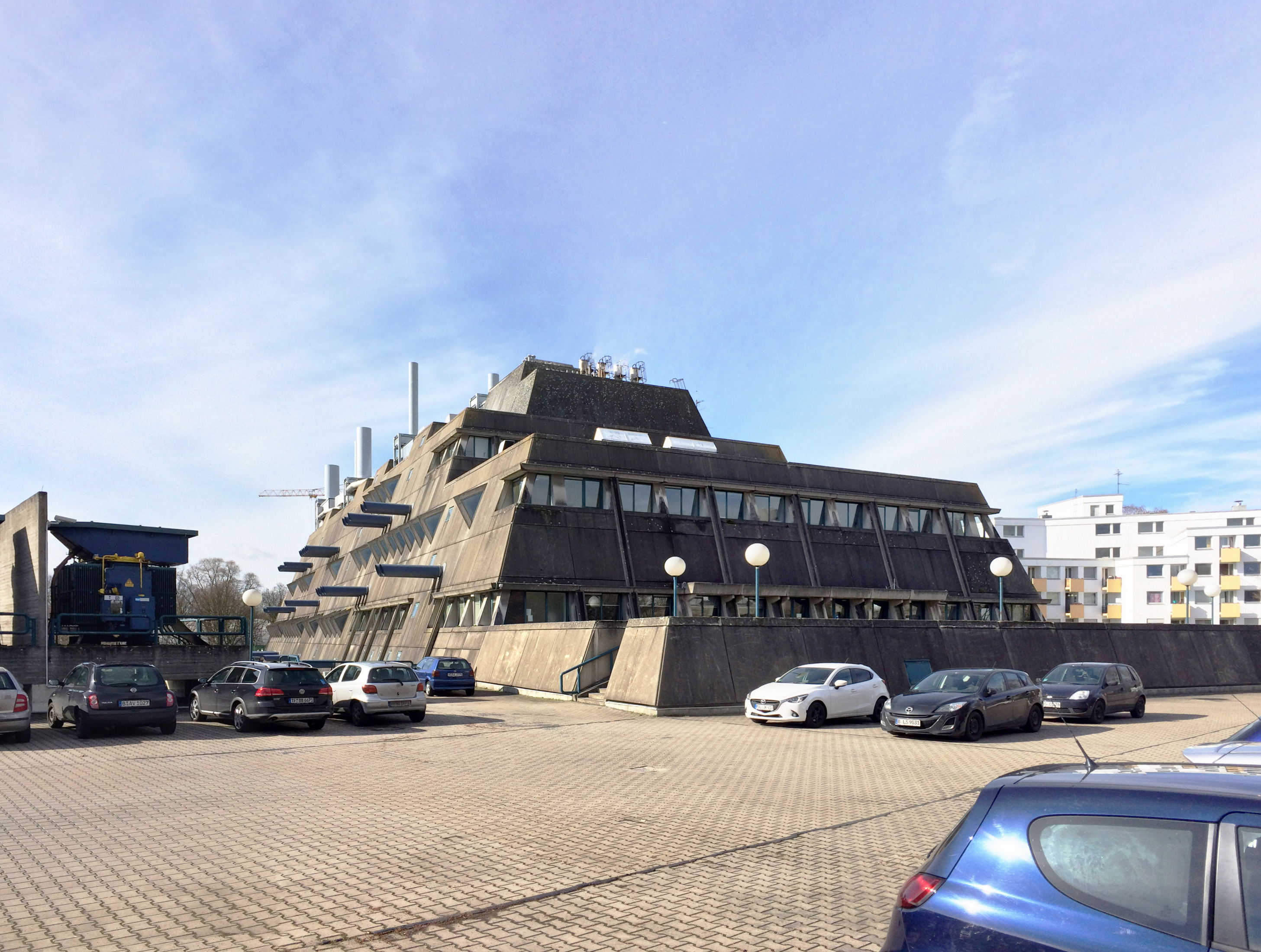
Mäusebunker

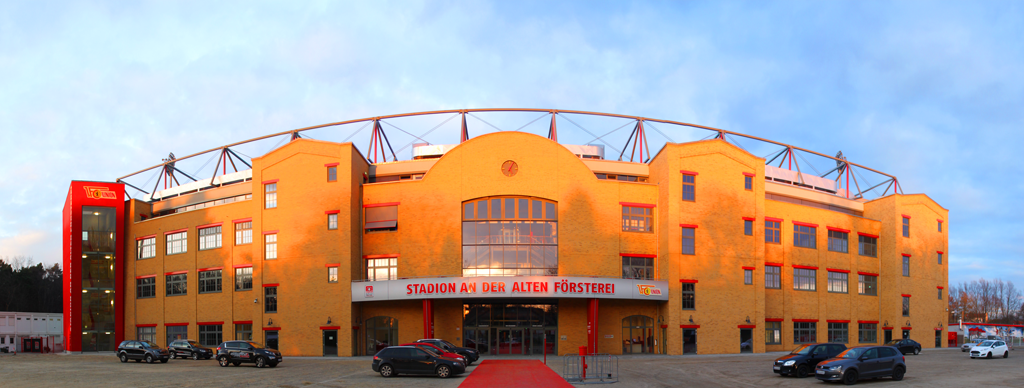
Stadion An der Alten Försterei

View of the Regierungsviertel _{(Government area)}

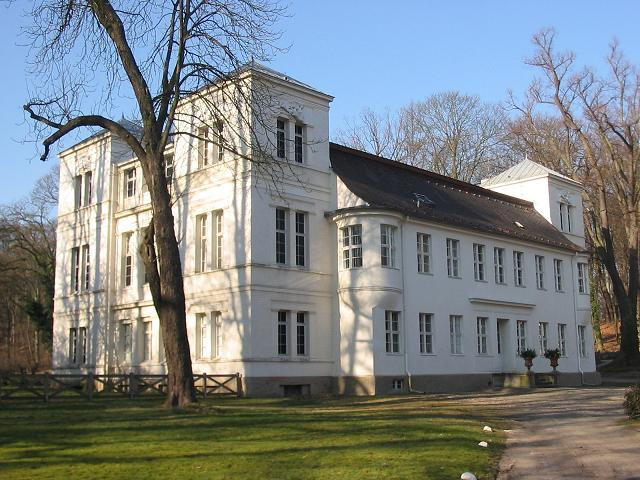
Schloss Tegel

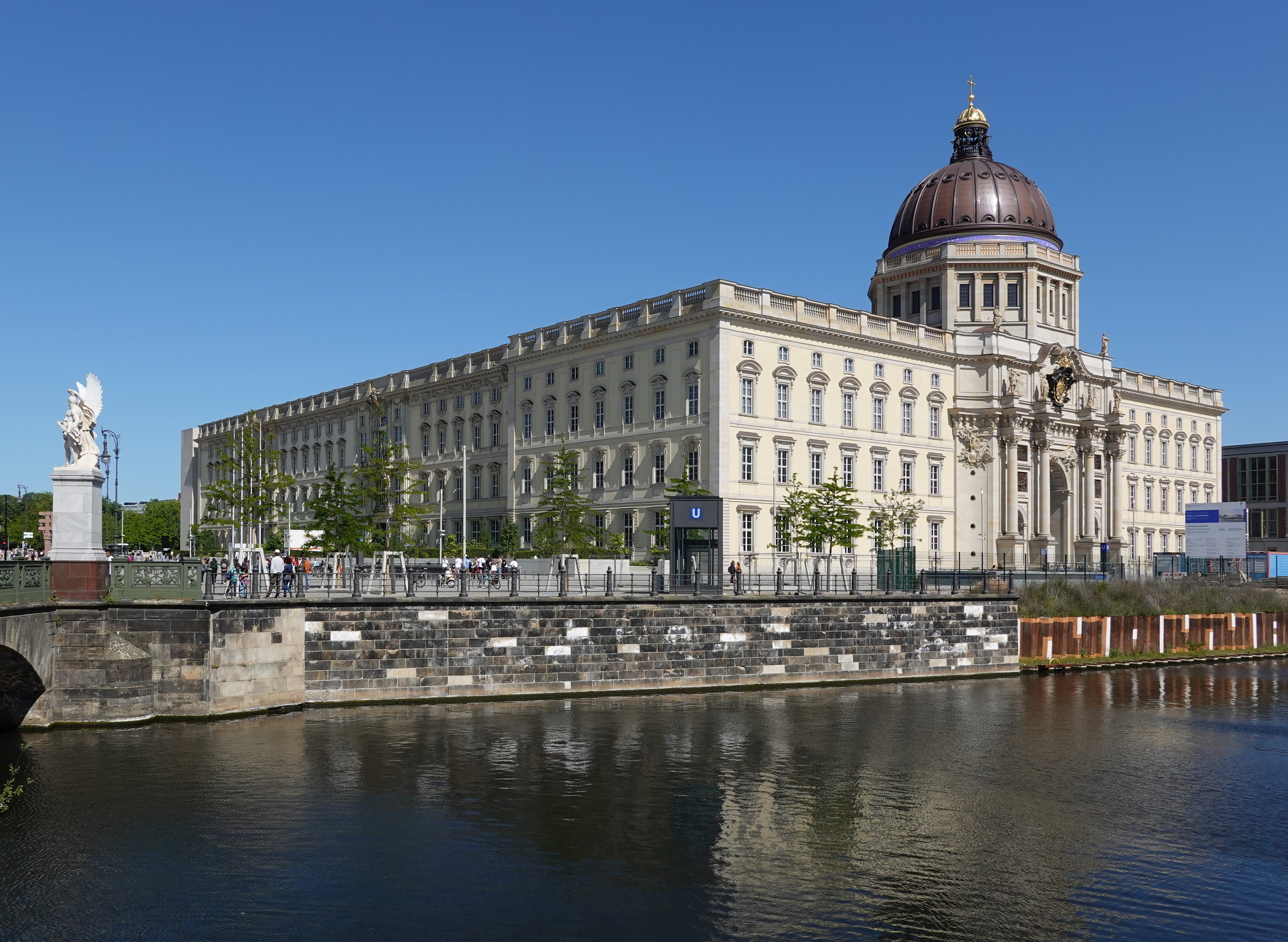
Berlin Palace / Humboldt Forum

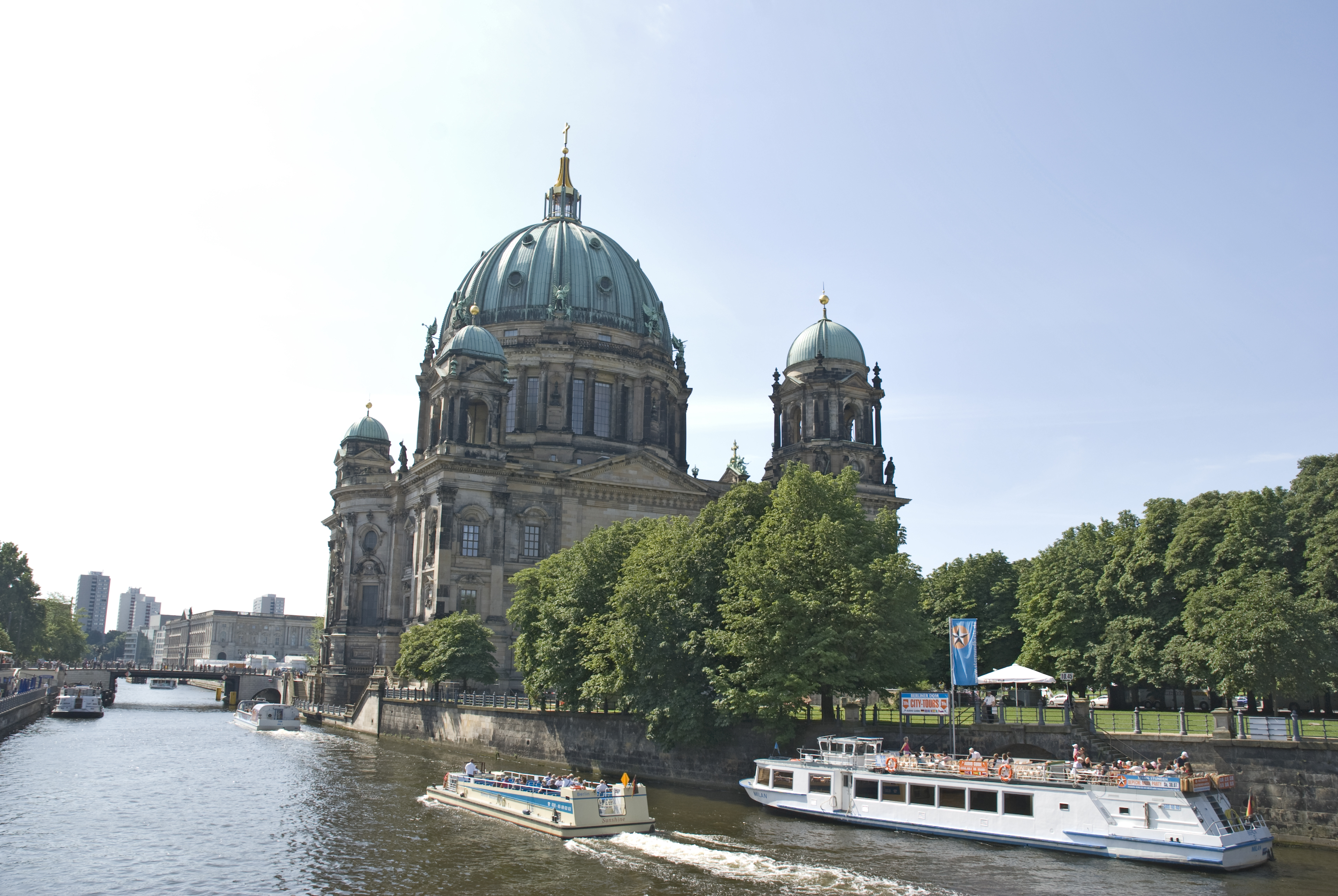
Berlin Cathedral (Dom)

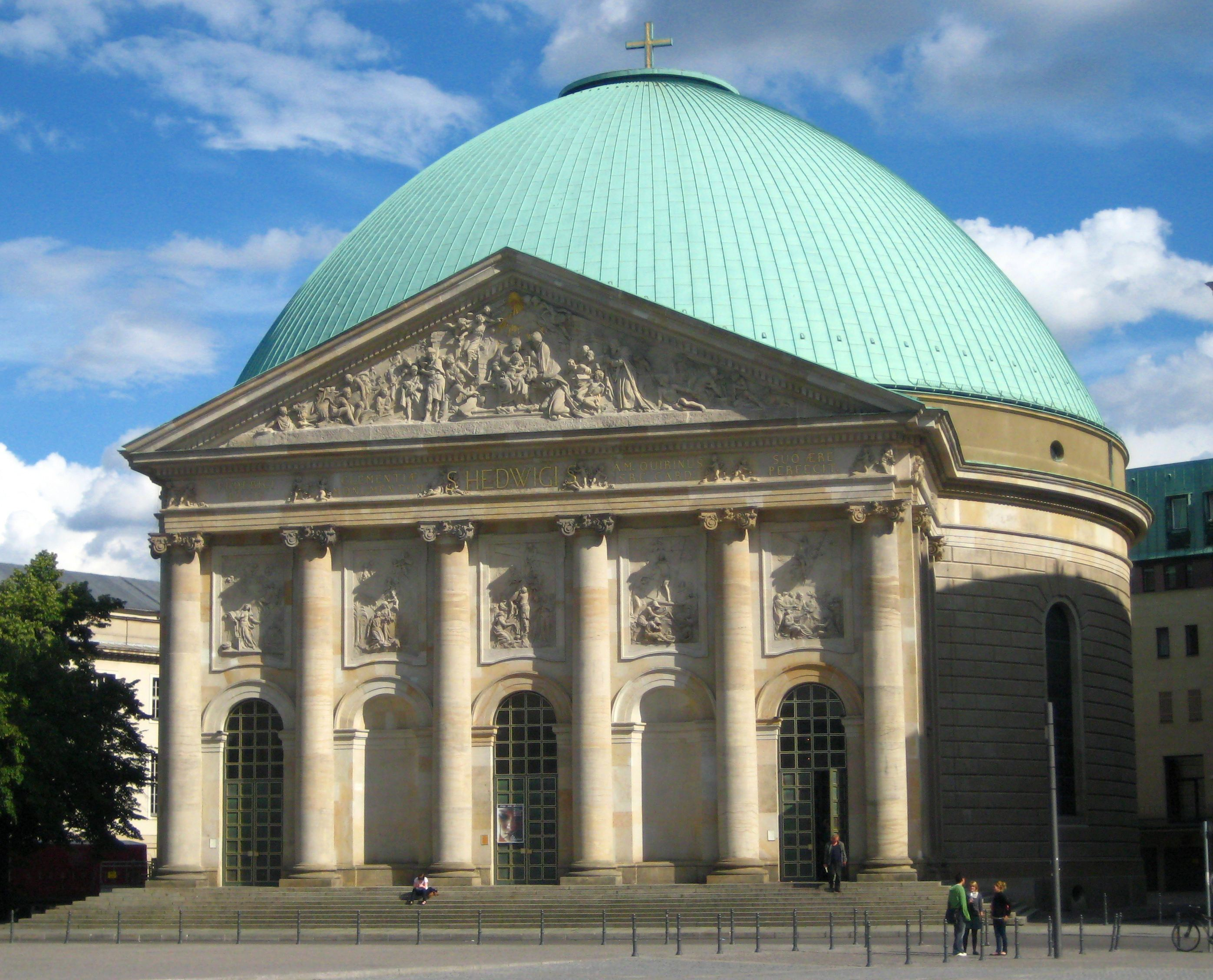
St. Hedwig's Cathedral

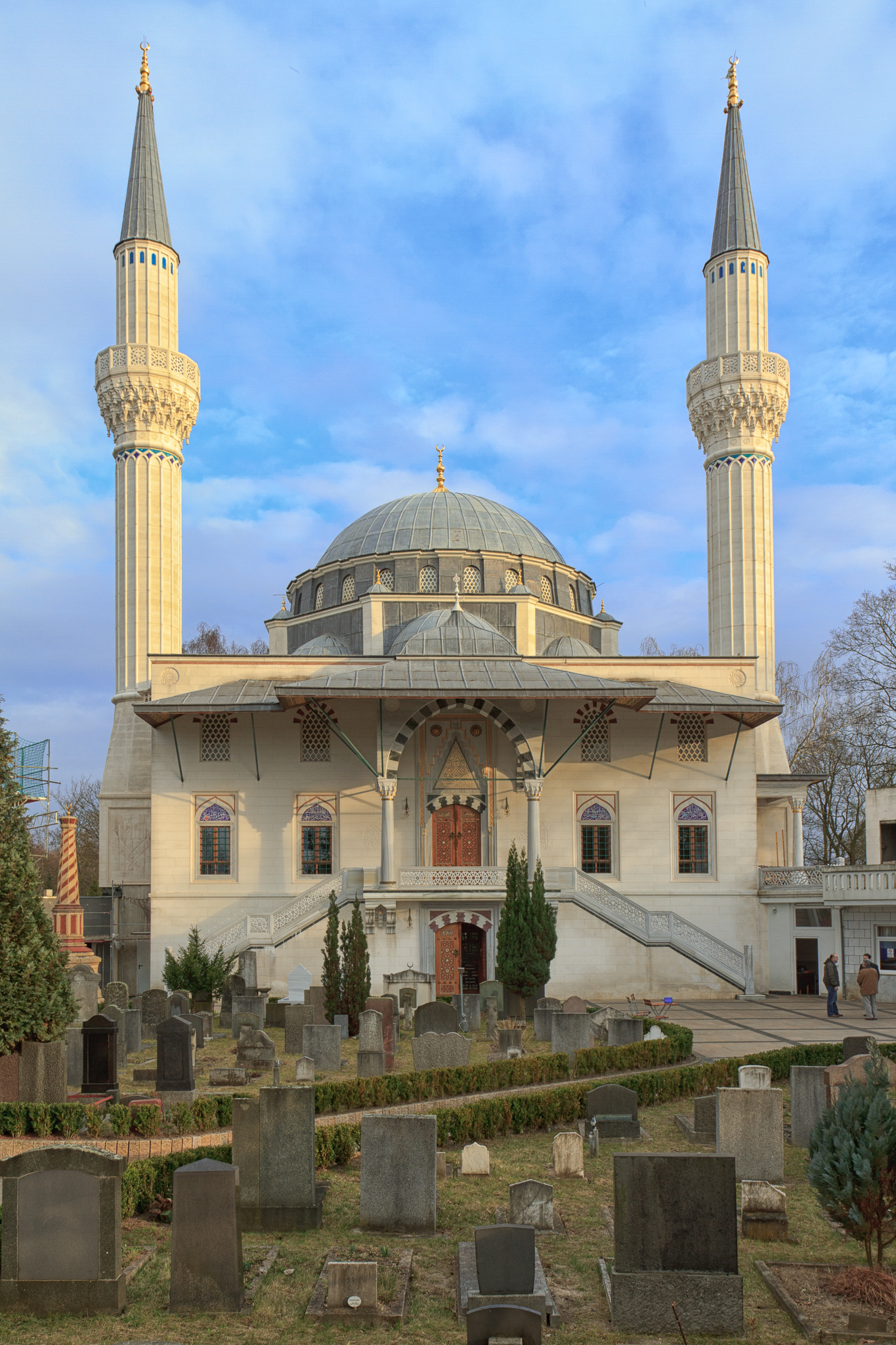
Şehitlik mosque

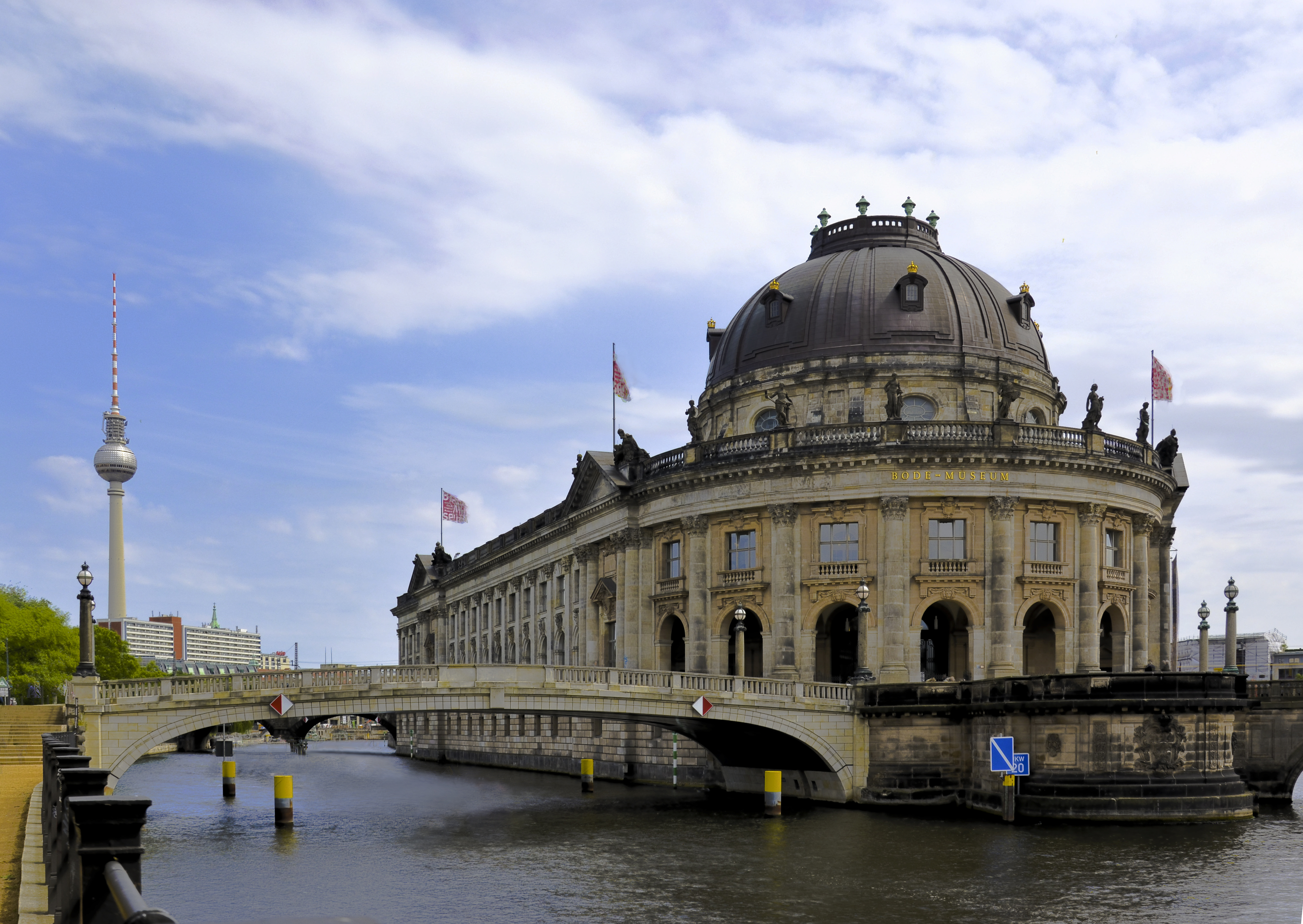
Bode Museum on Museum Island

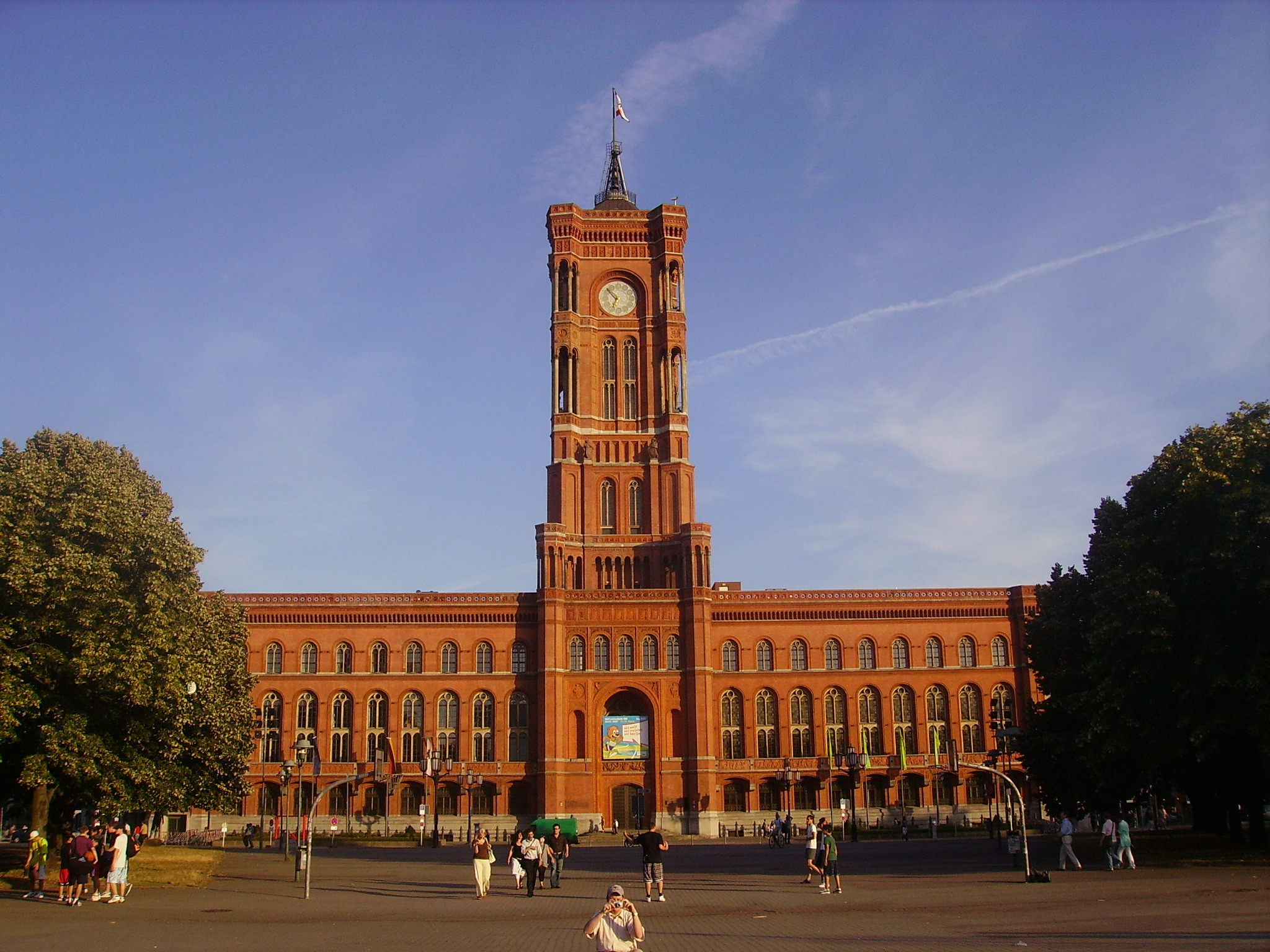
Rotes Rathaus (Red City Hall)

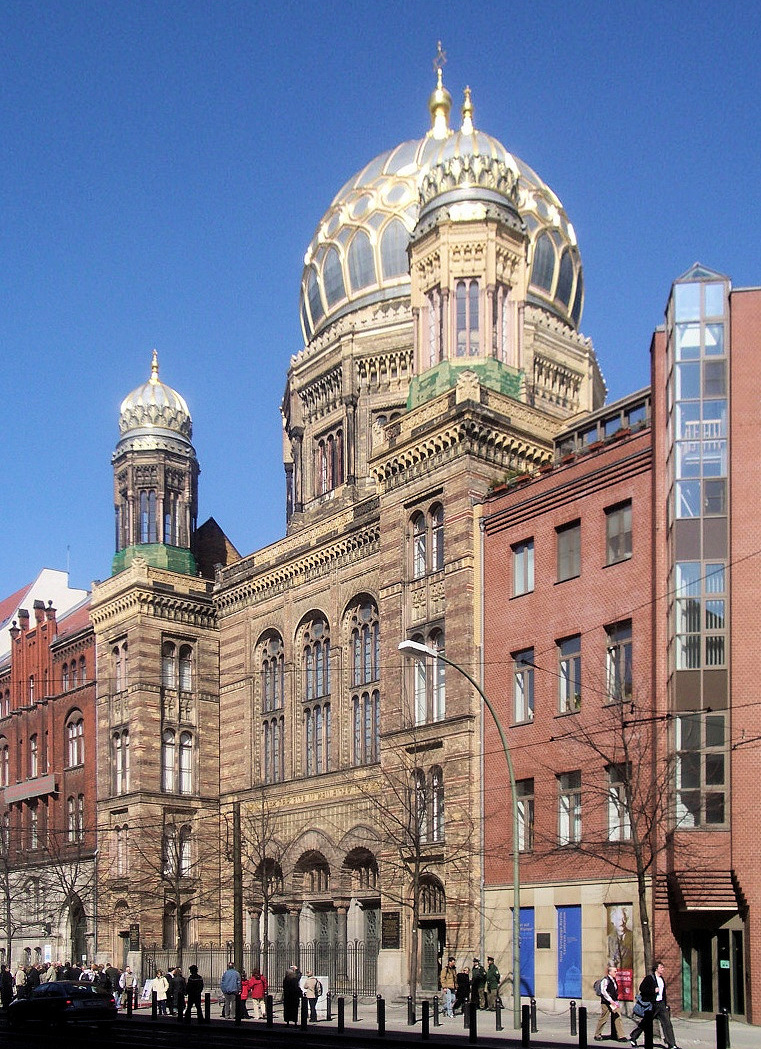
New Synagogue

Gendarmenmarkt

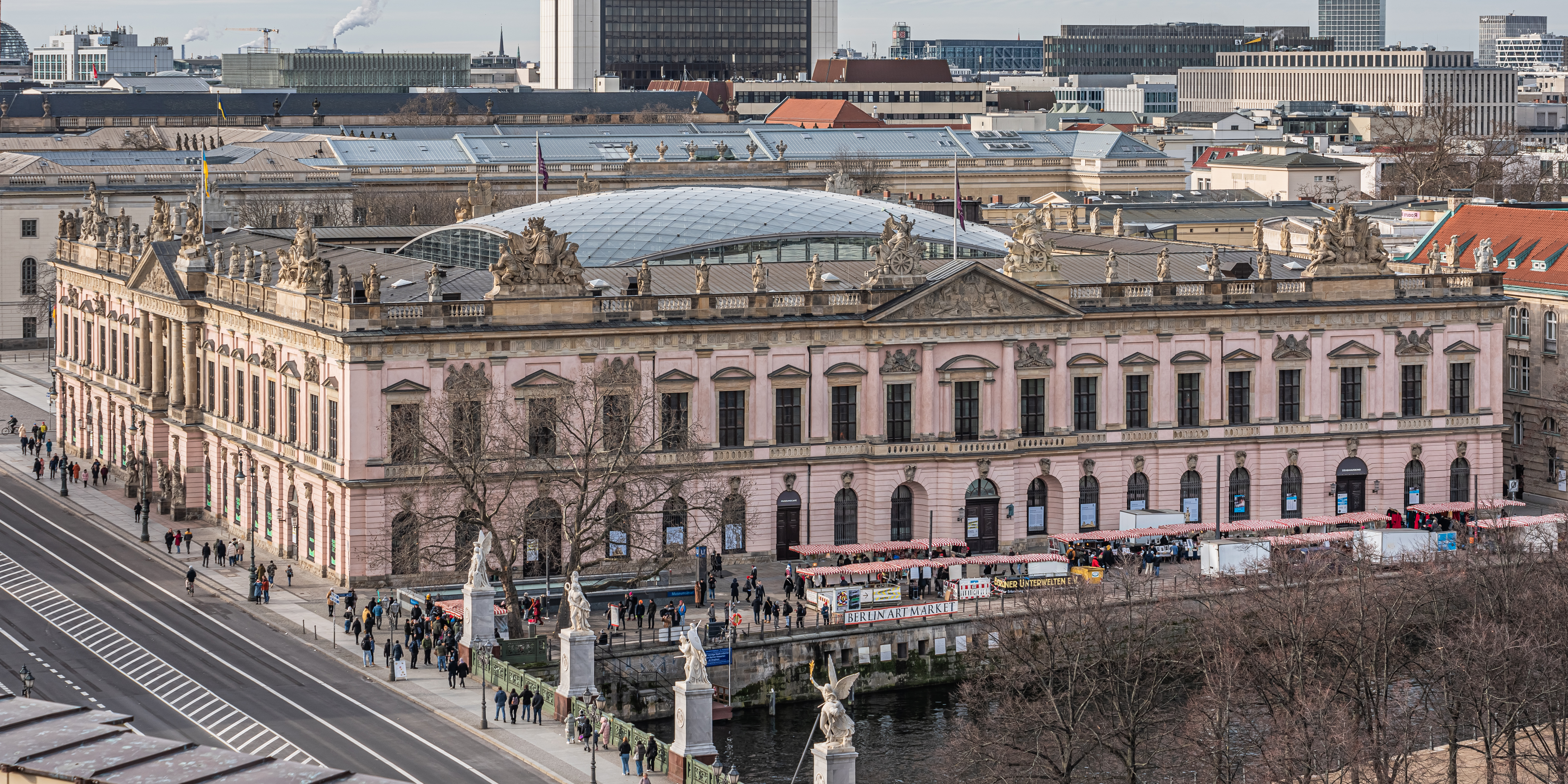
Former armory, now museum on Unter den Linden boulevard

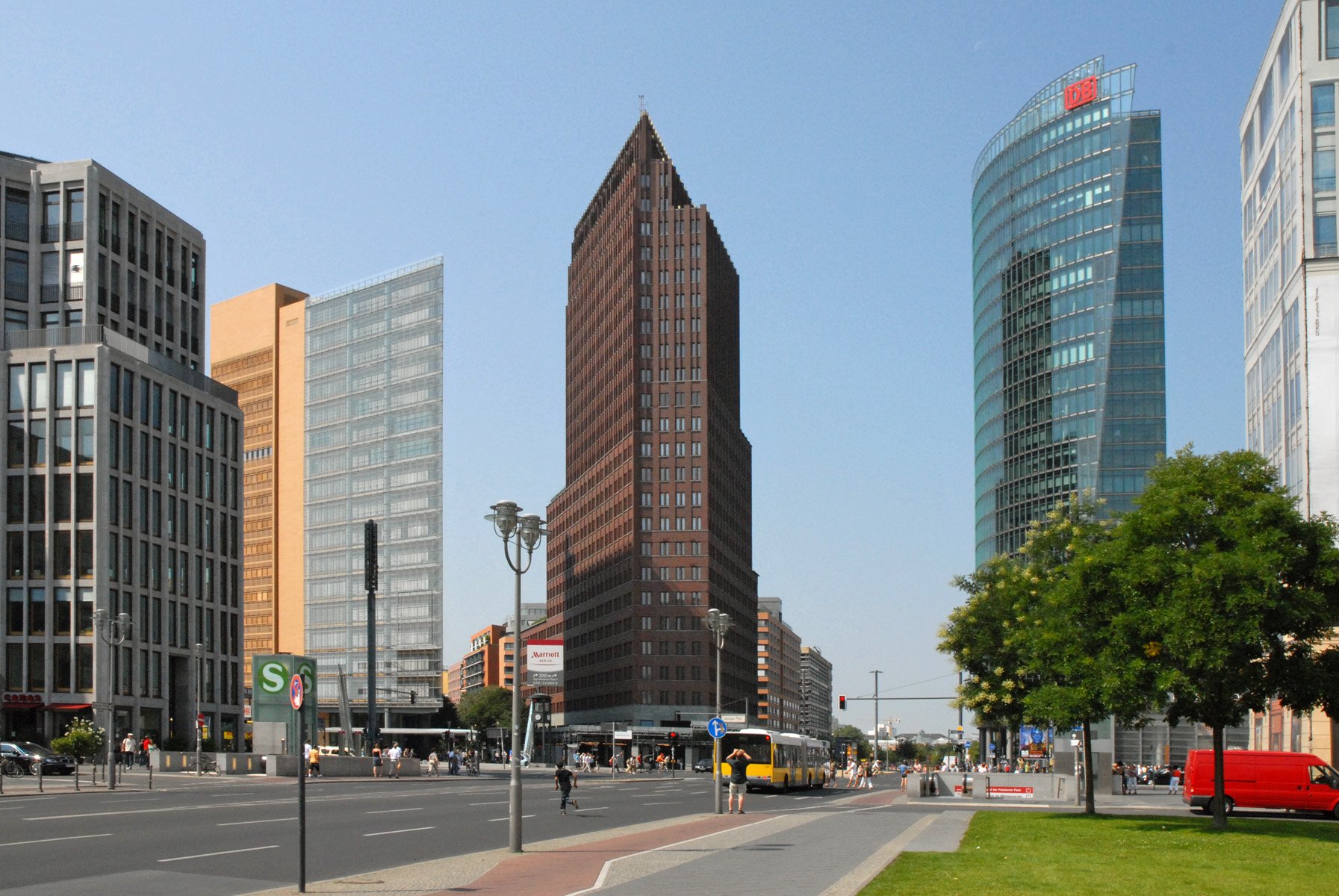
View over Potsdamer Platz

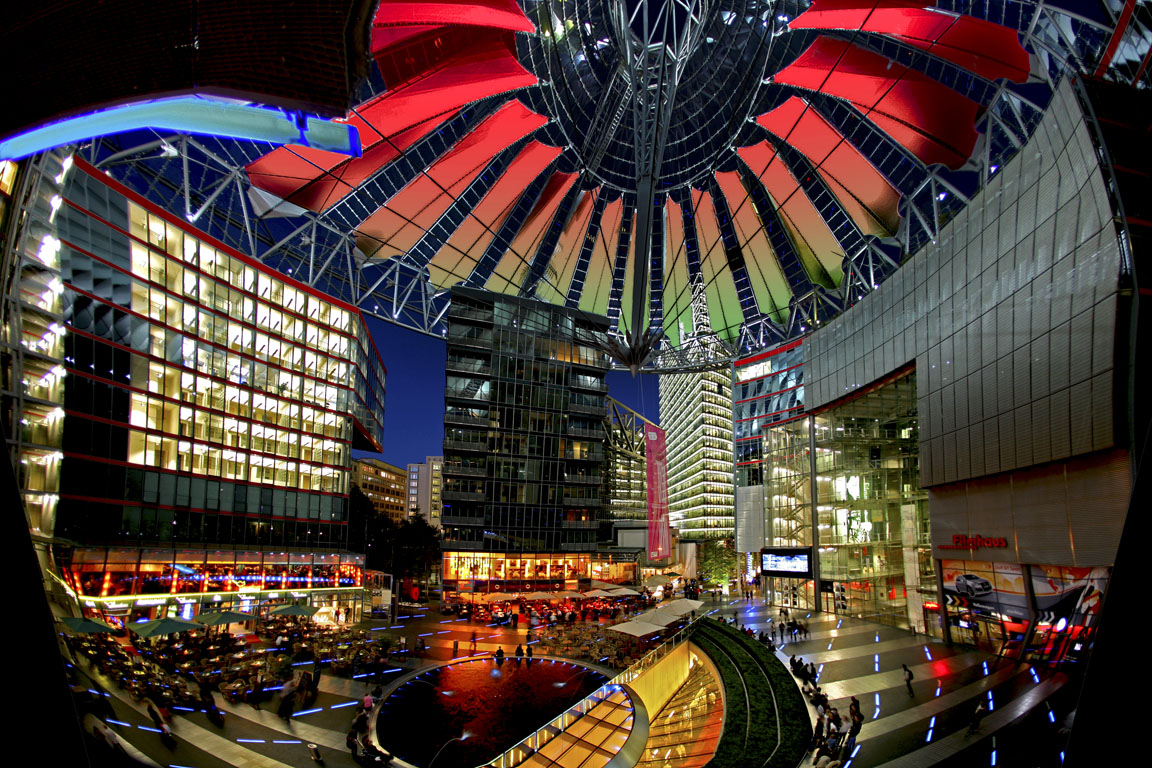
Inside the Sony Center

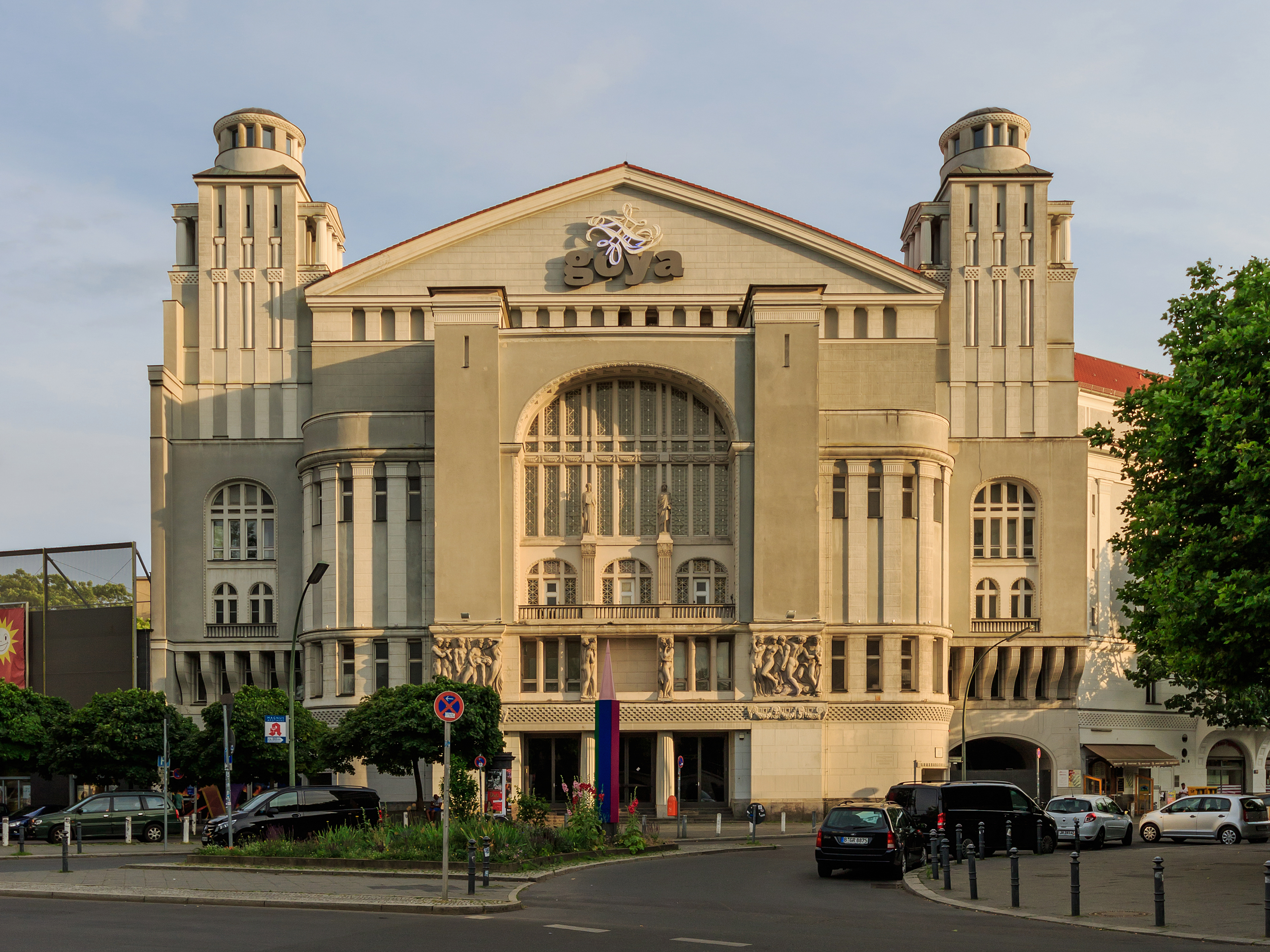
Metropol

Alexanderplatz

Pariser Platz with Brandenburg Gate

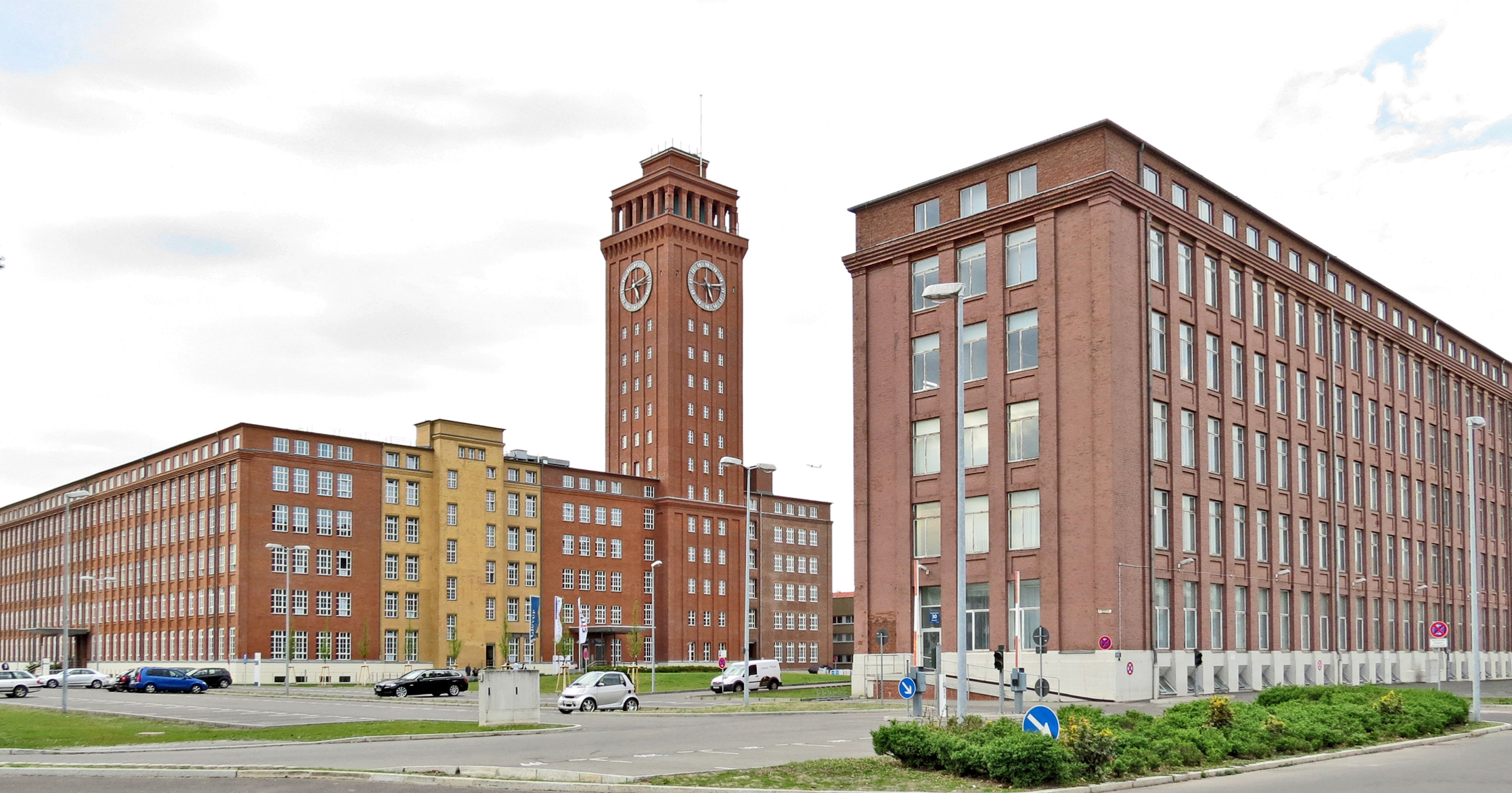
Siemensstadt

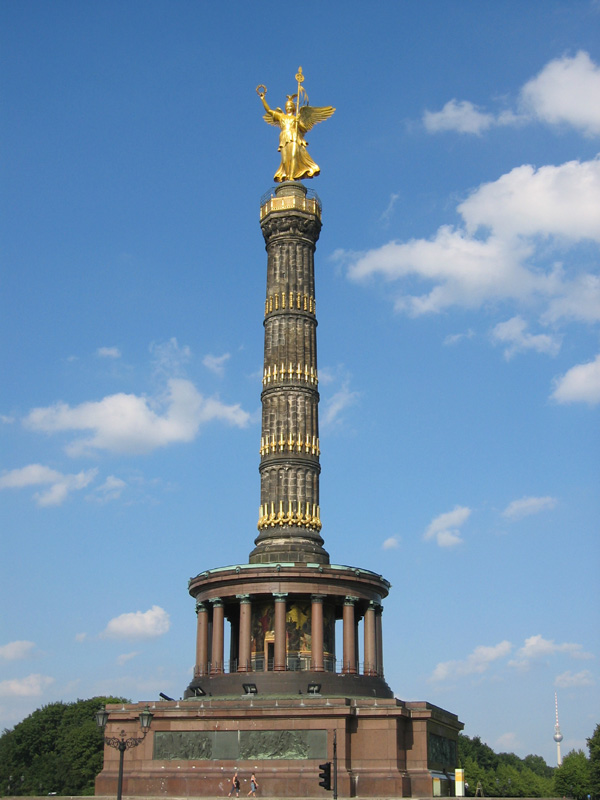
Berlin Victory Column in the Tiergarten

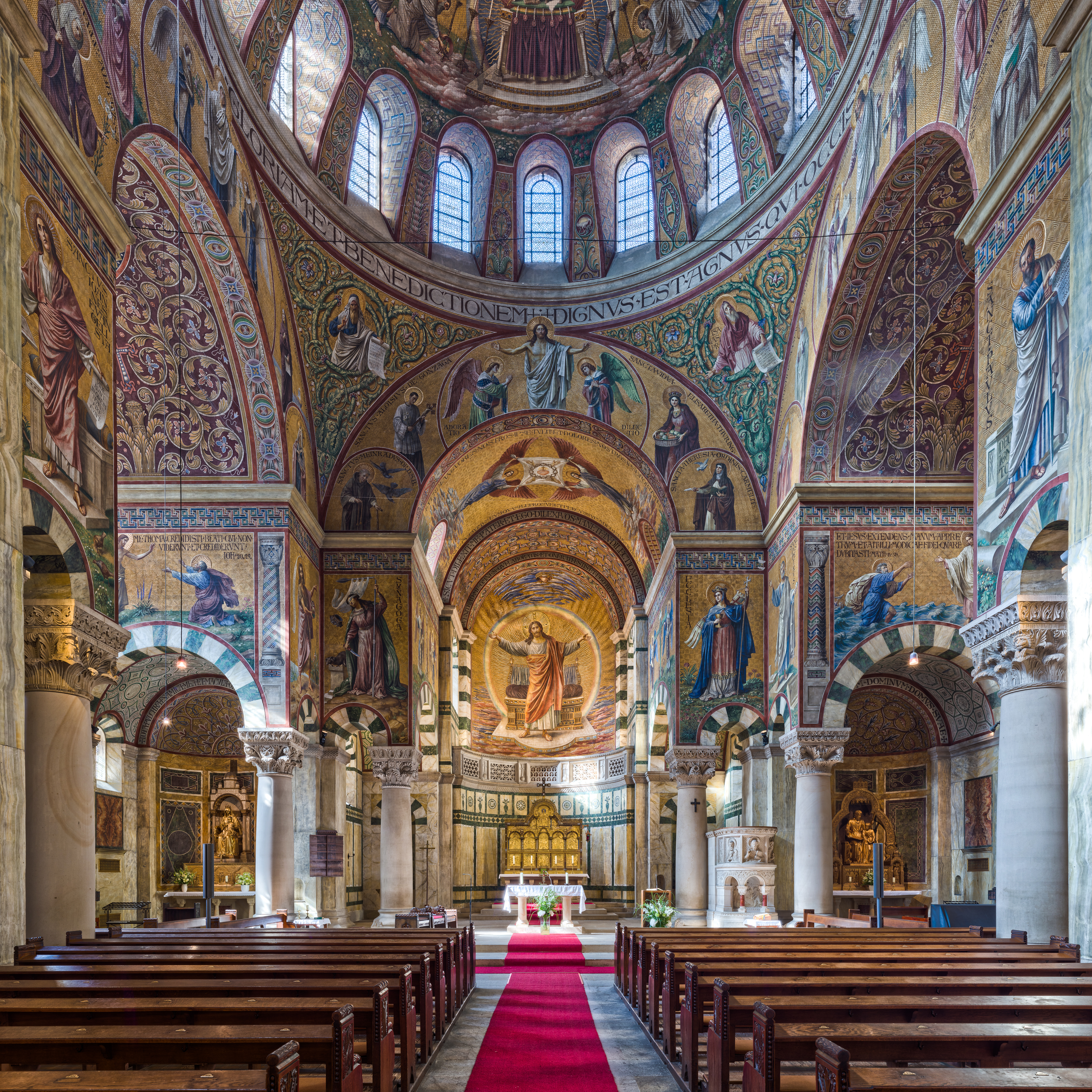
Herz-Jesu-Kirche

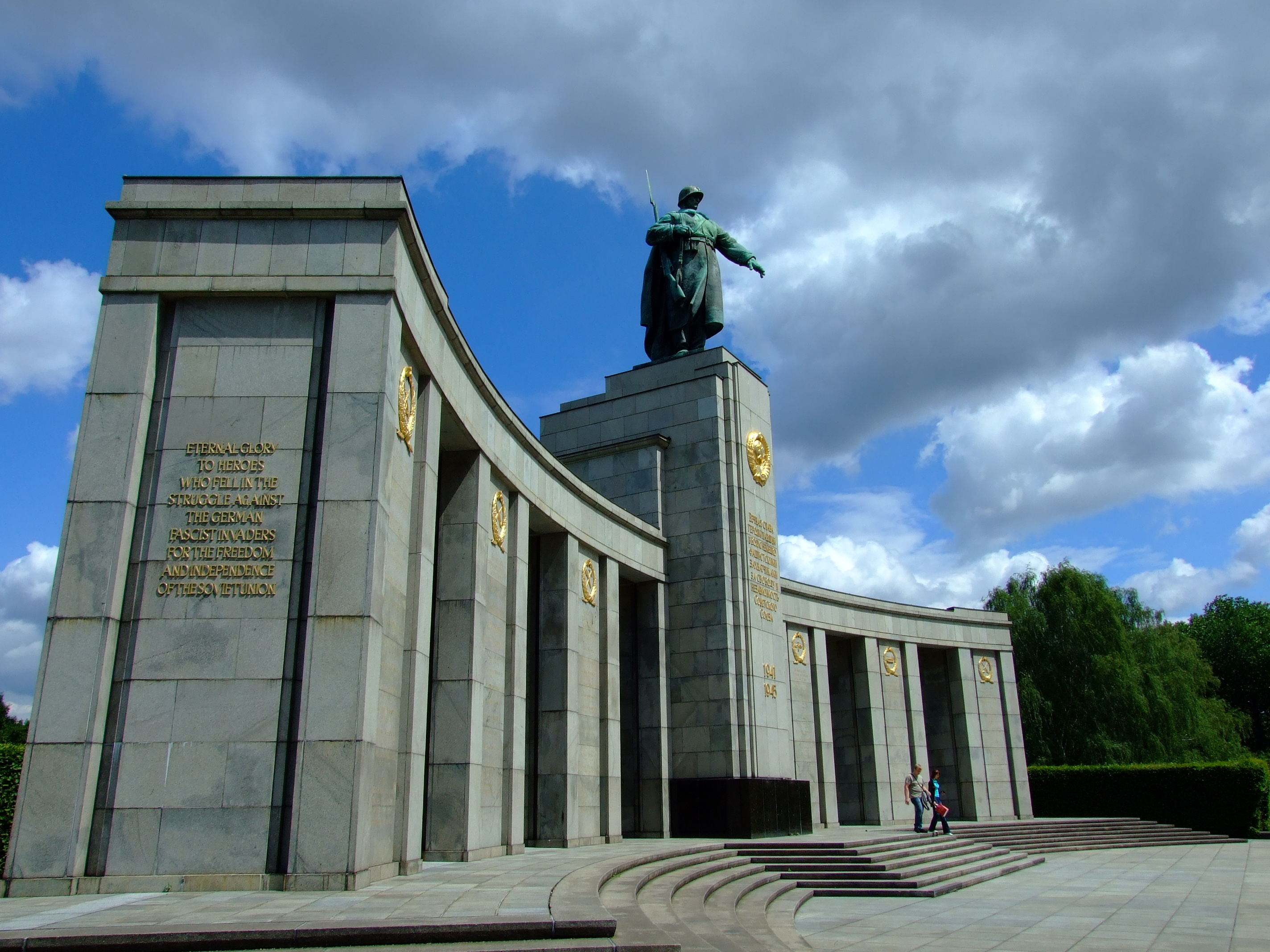
Soviet War Memorial

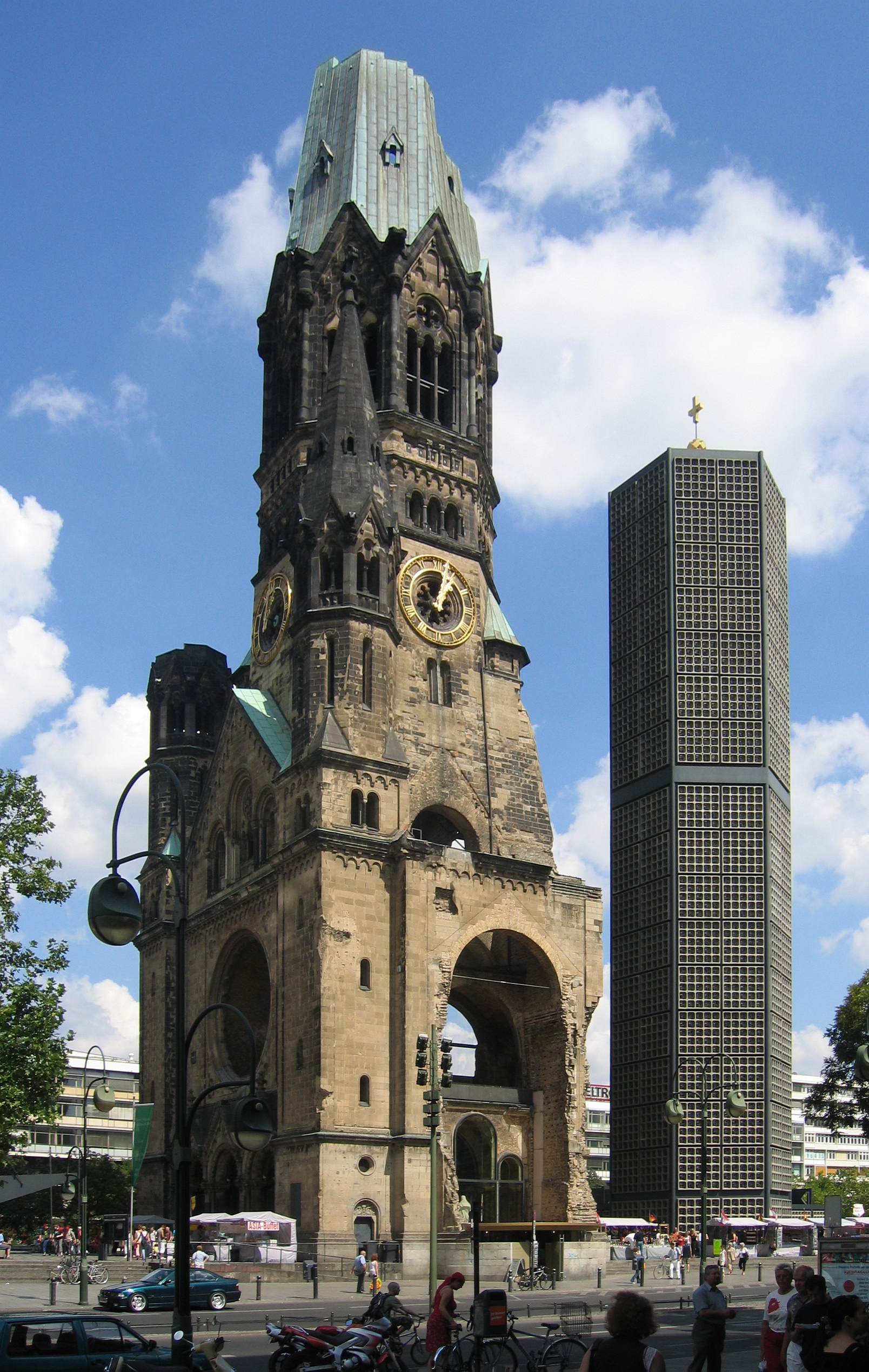
Kaiser Wilhelm Memorial Church

Charlottenburg Palace

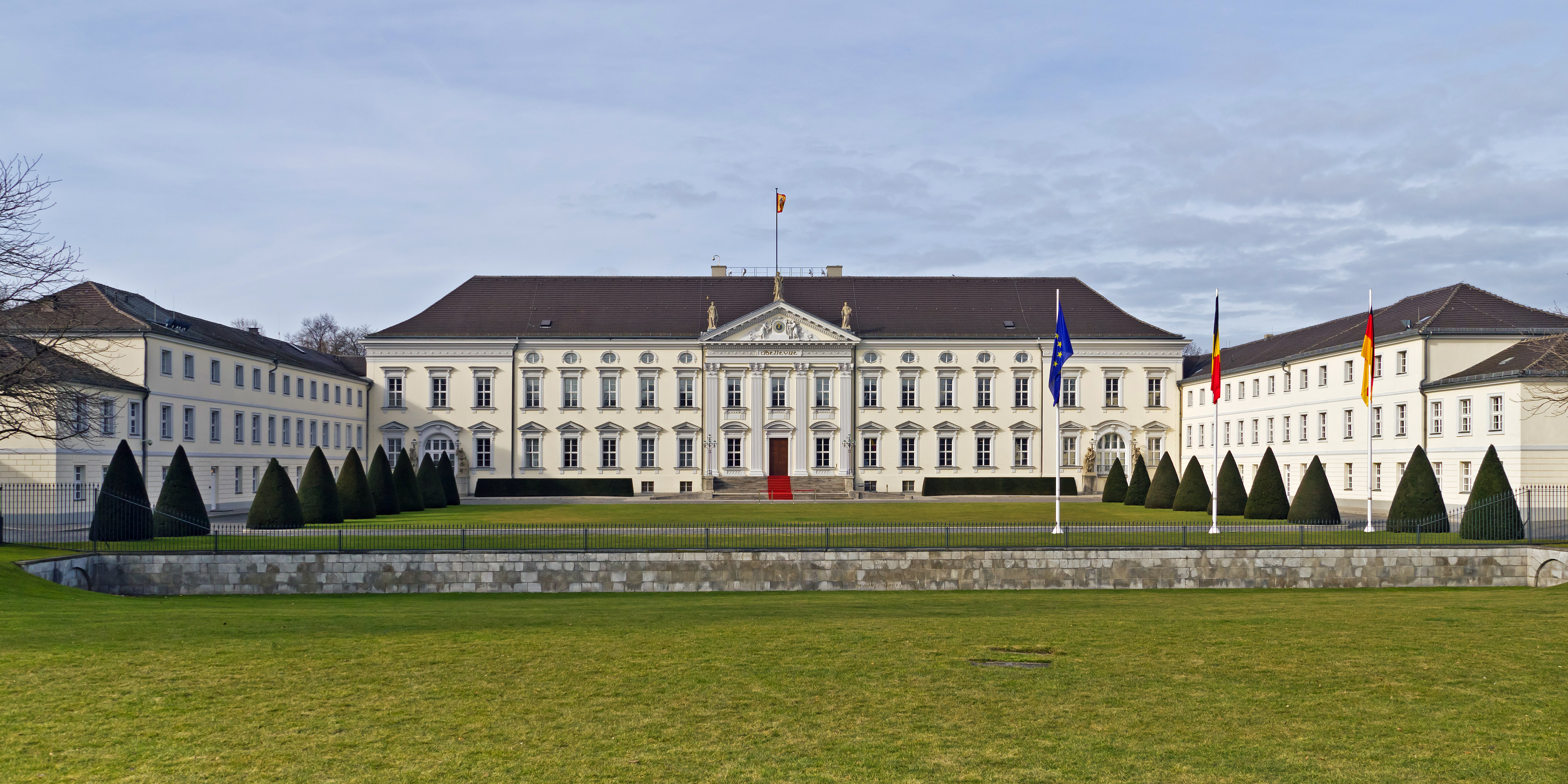
Bellevue Palace

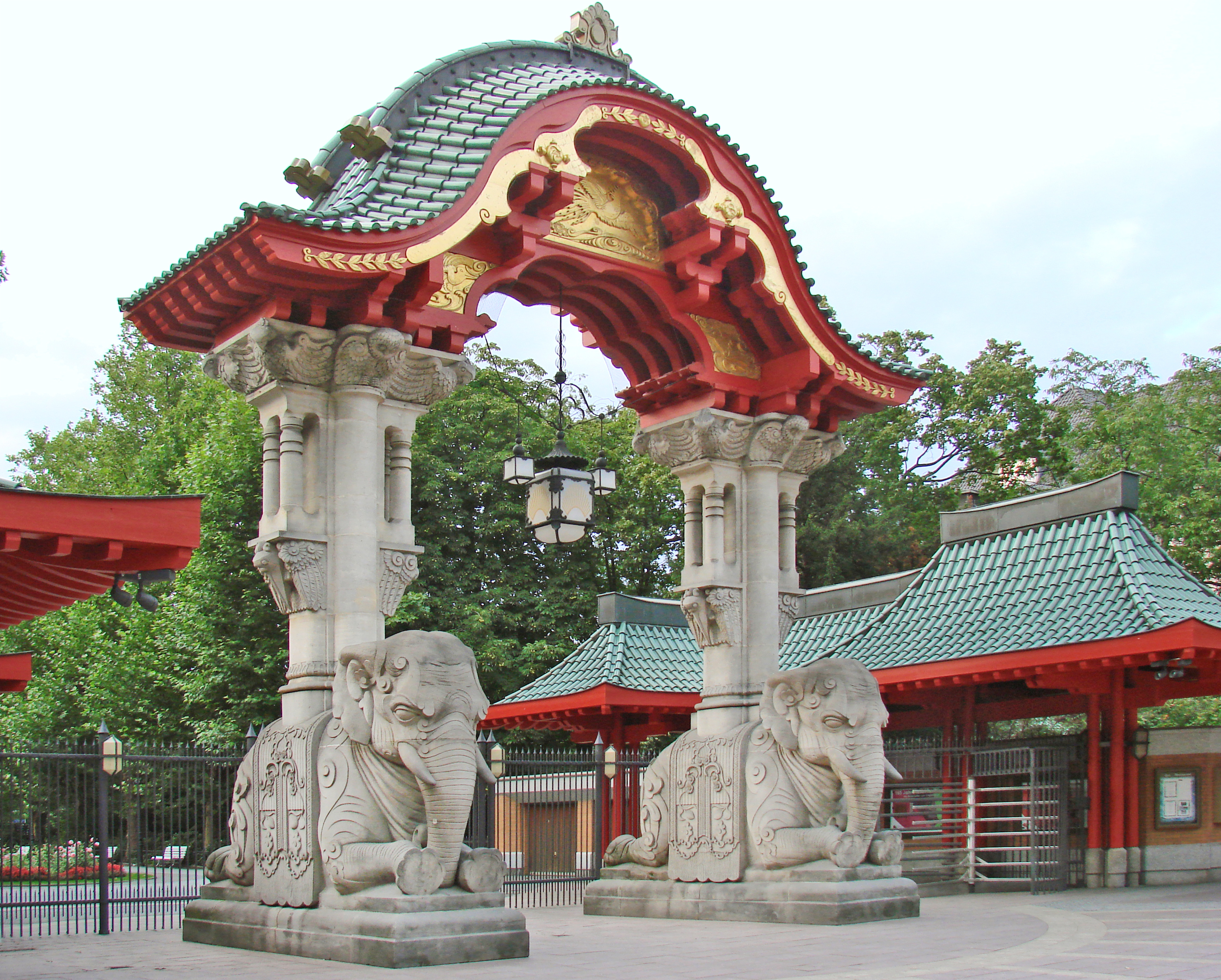
Entrance to Berlin Zoo

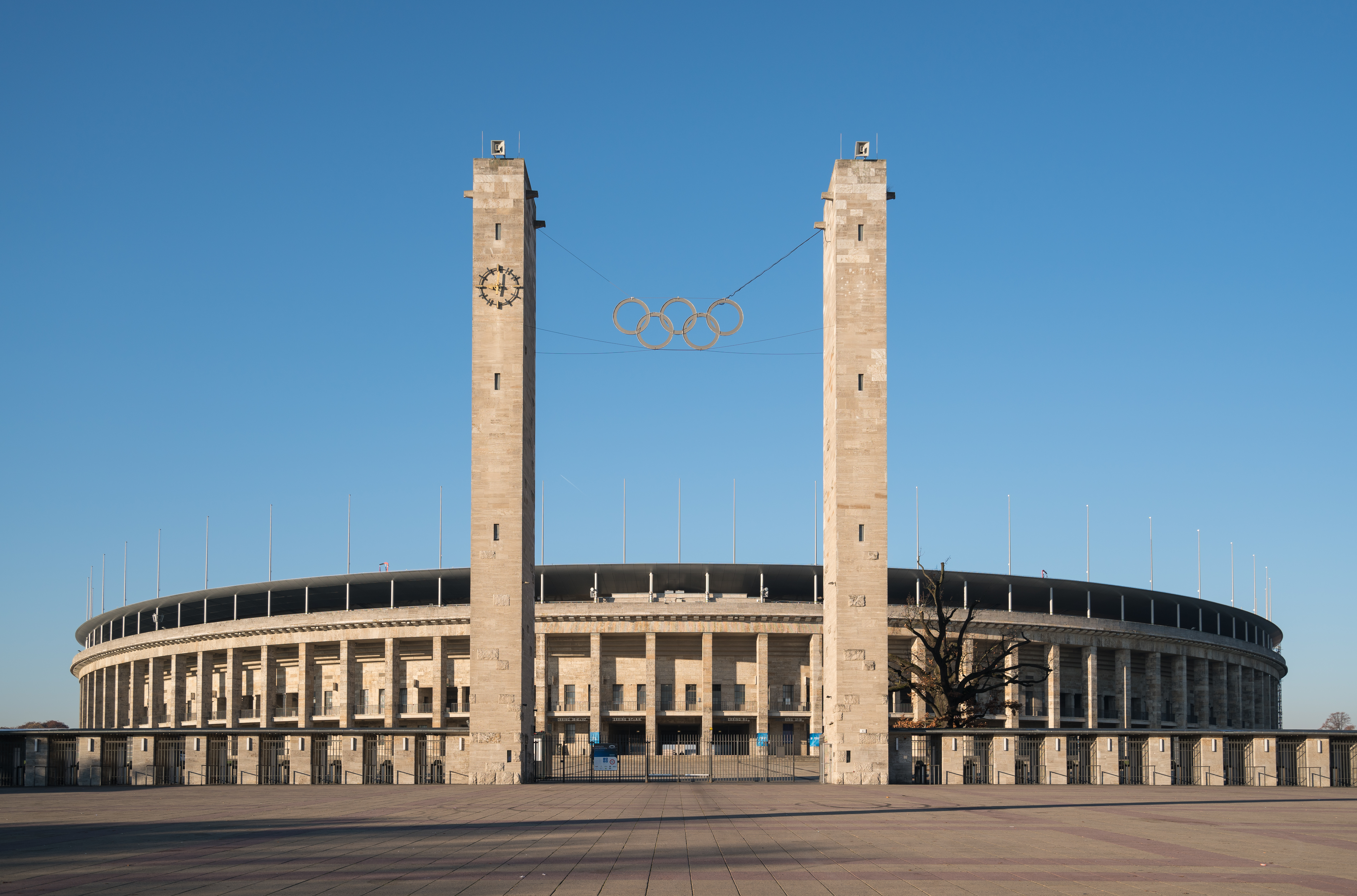
Olympic Stadium

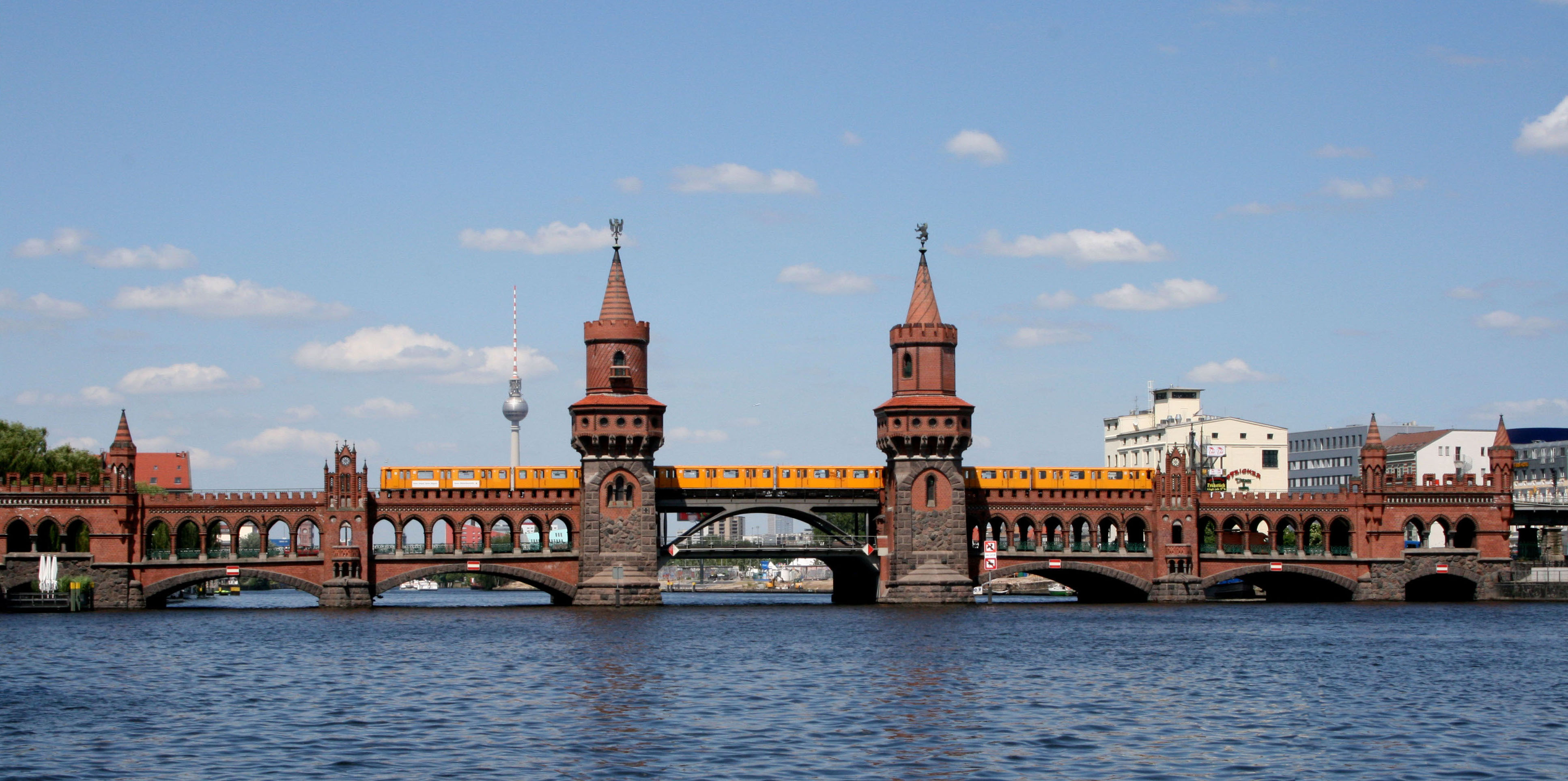
Oberbaum Bridge

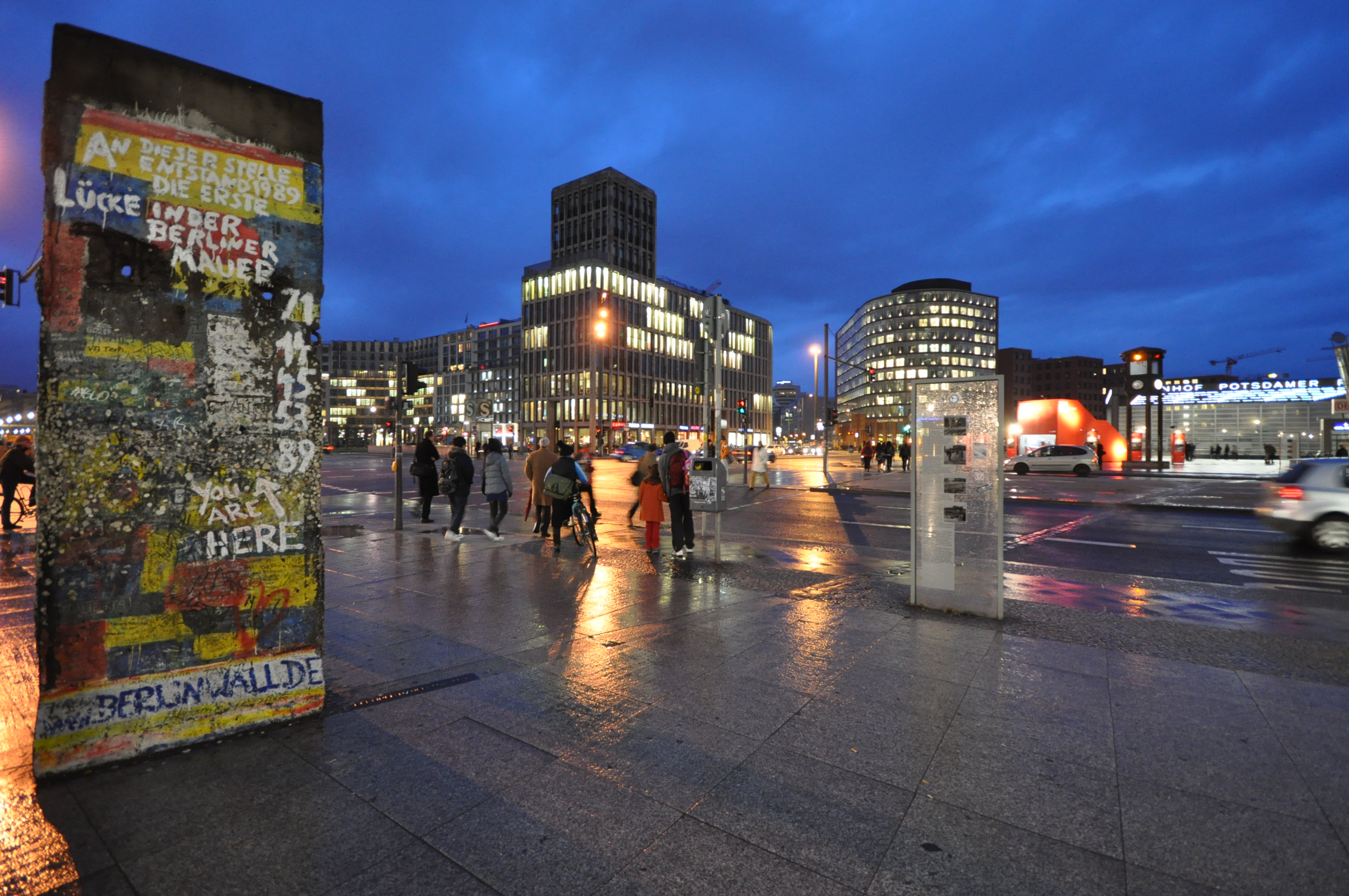
Section of the Cold War Berlin Wall

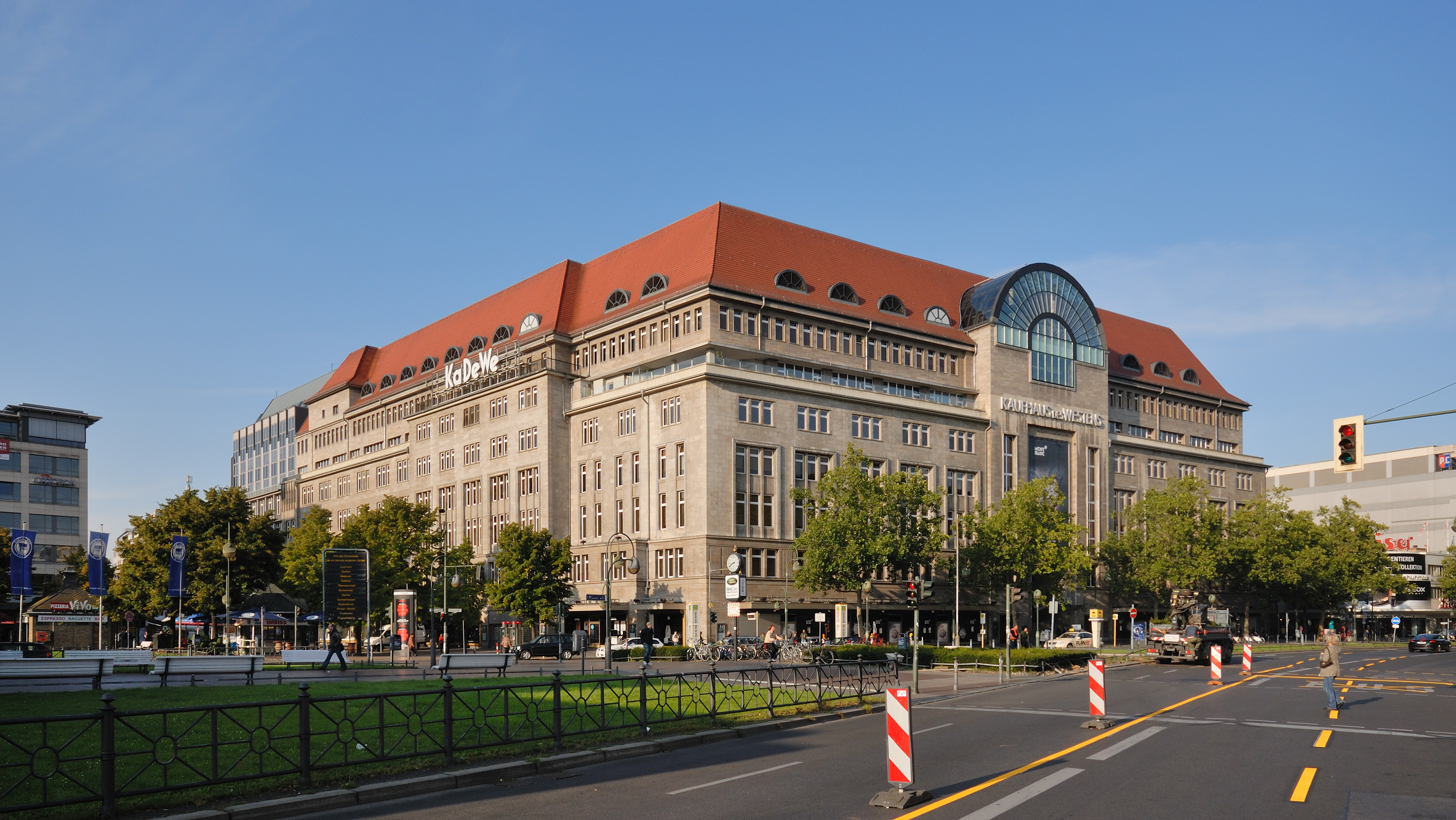
The Kaufhaus des Westens department store

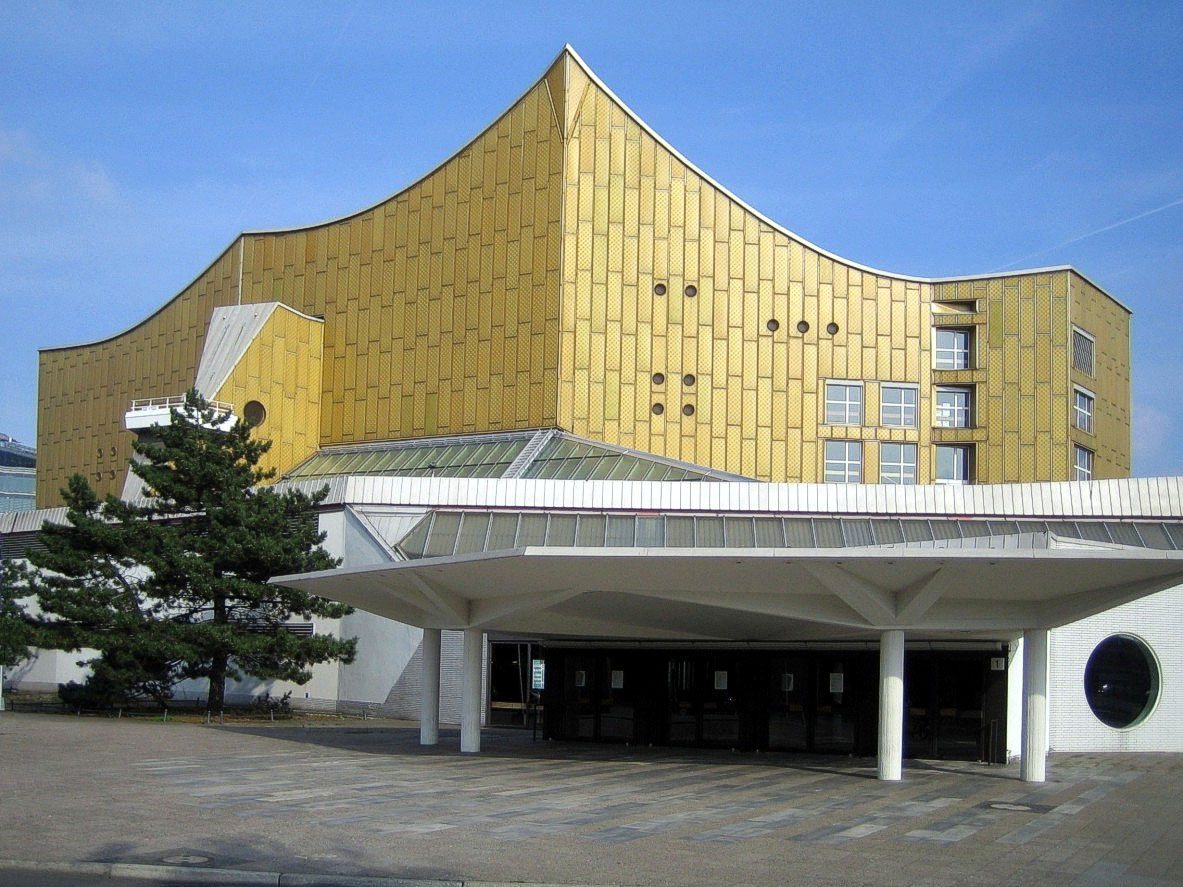
Berliner Philharmonie

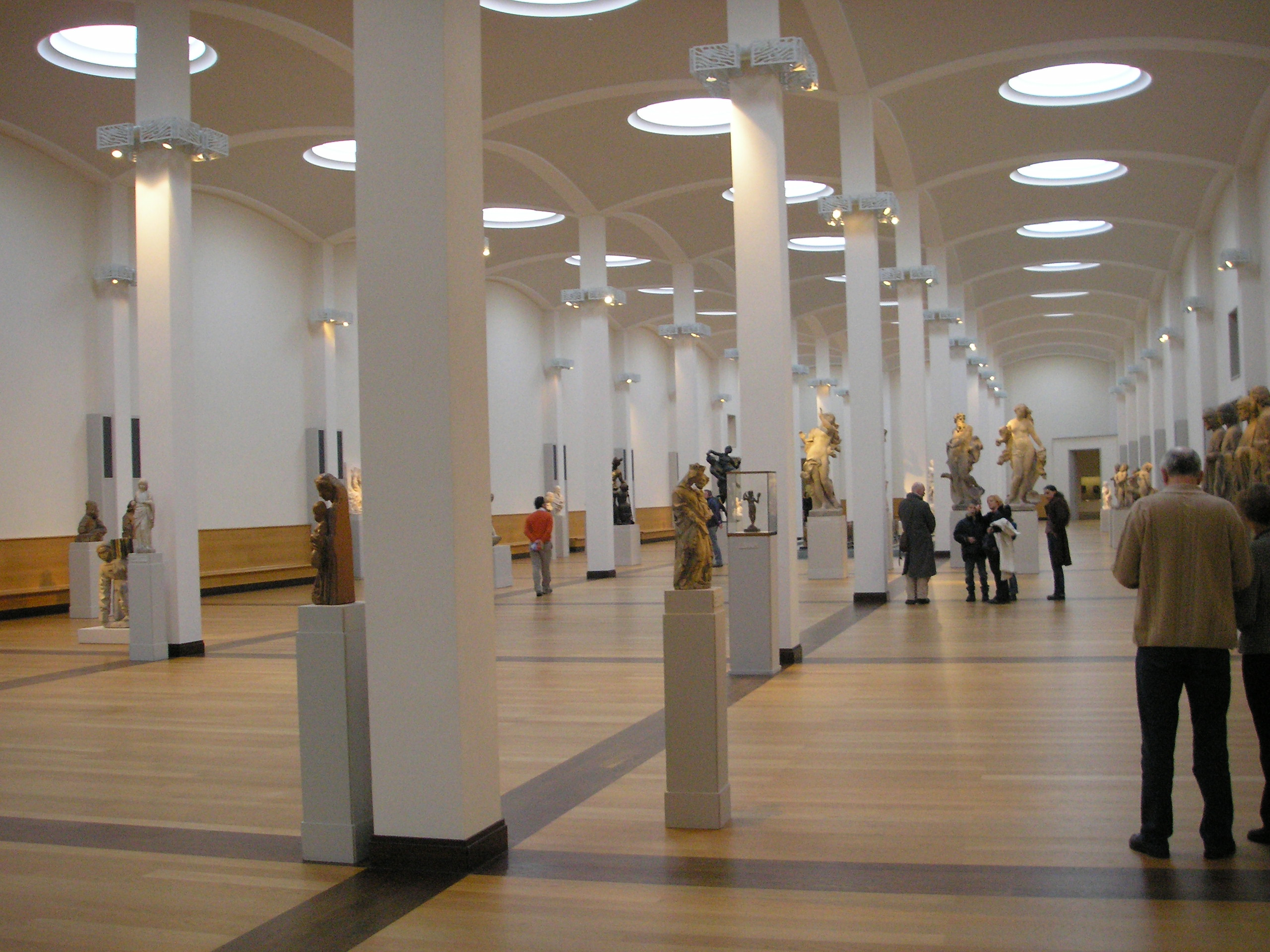
Inside the Gemäldegalerie, Berlin

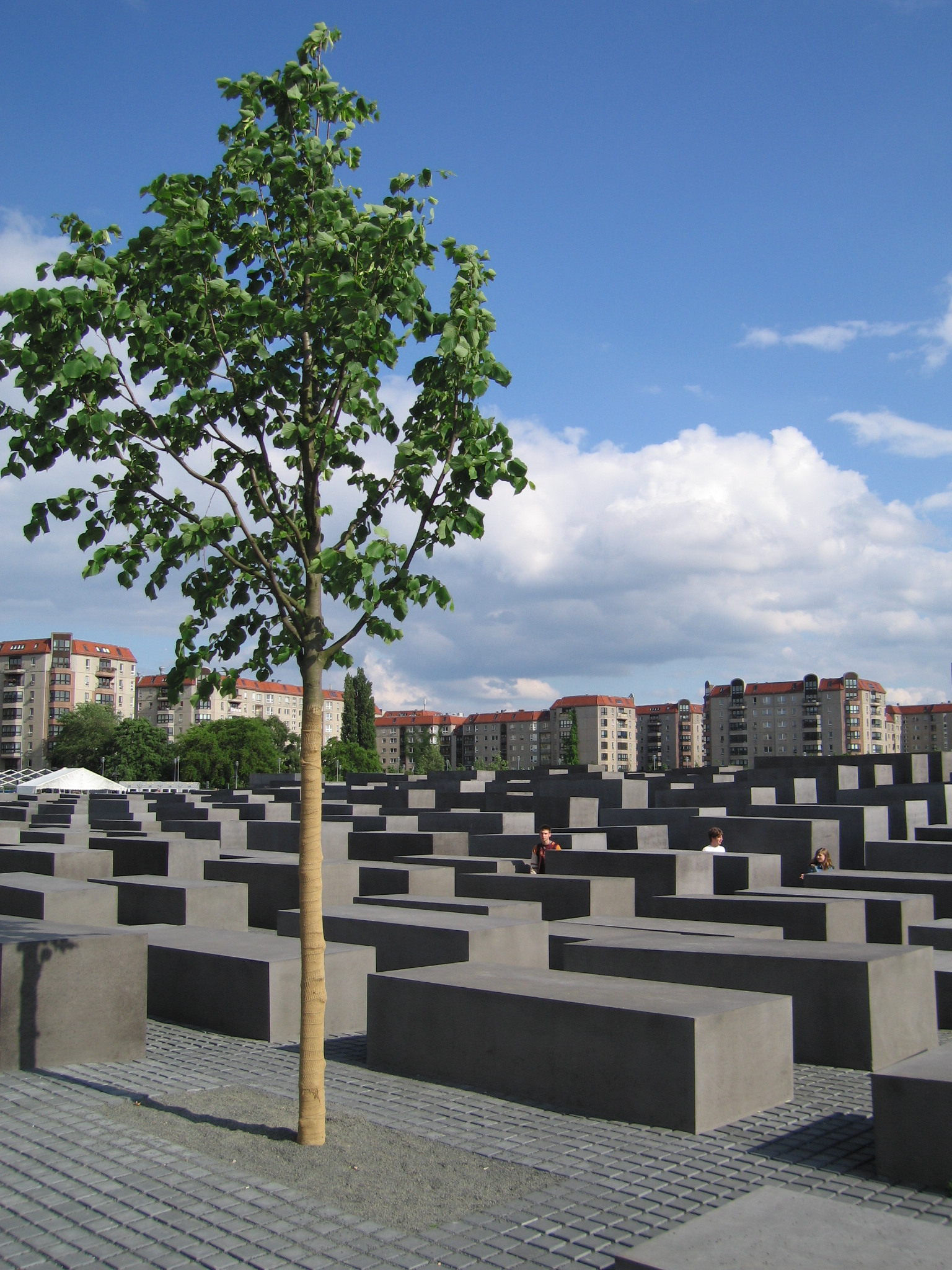
Memorial to the Murdered Jews of Europe

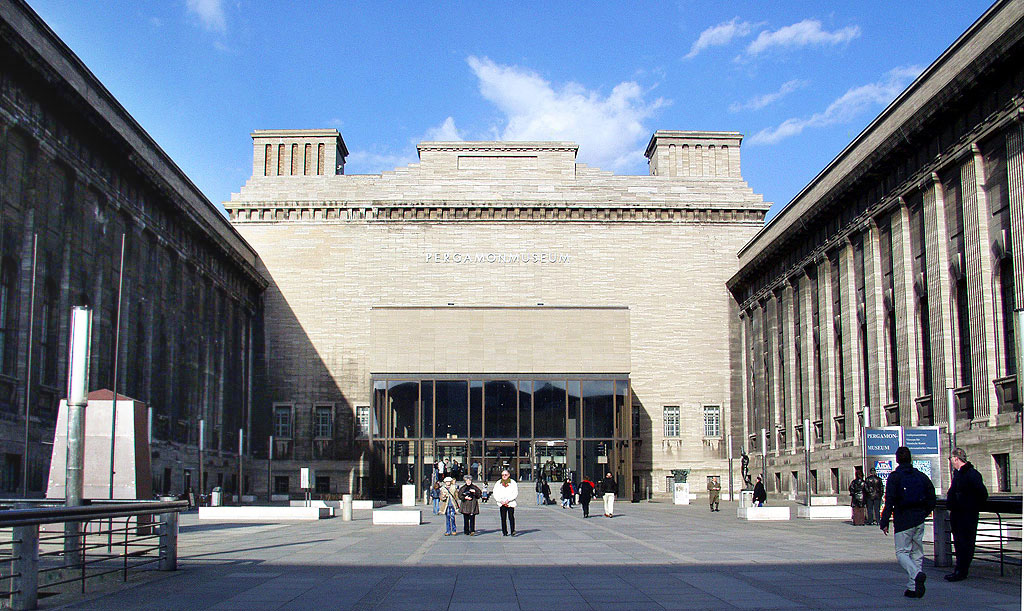
Pergamon Museum

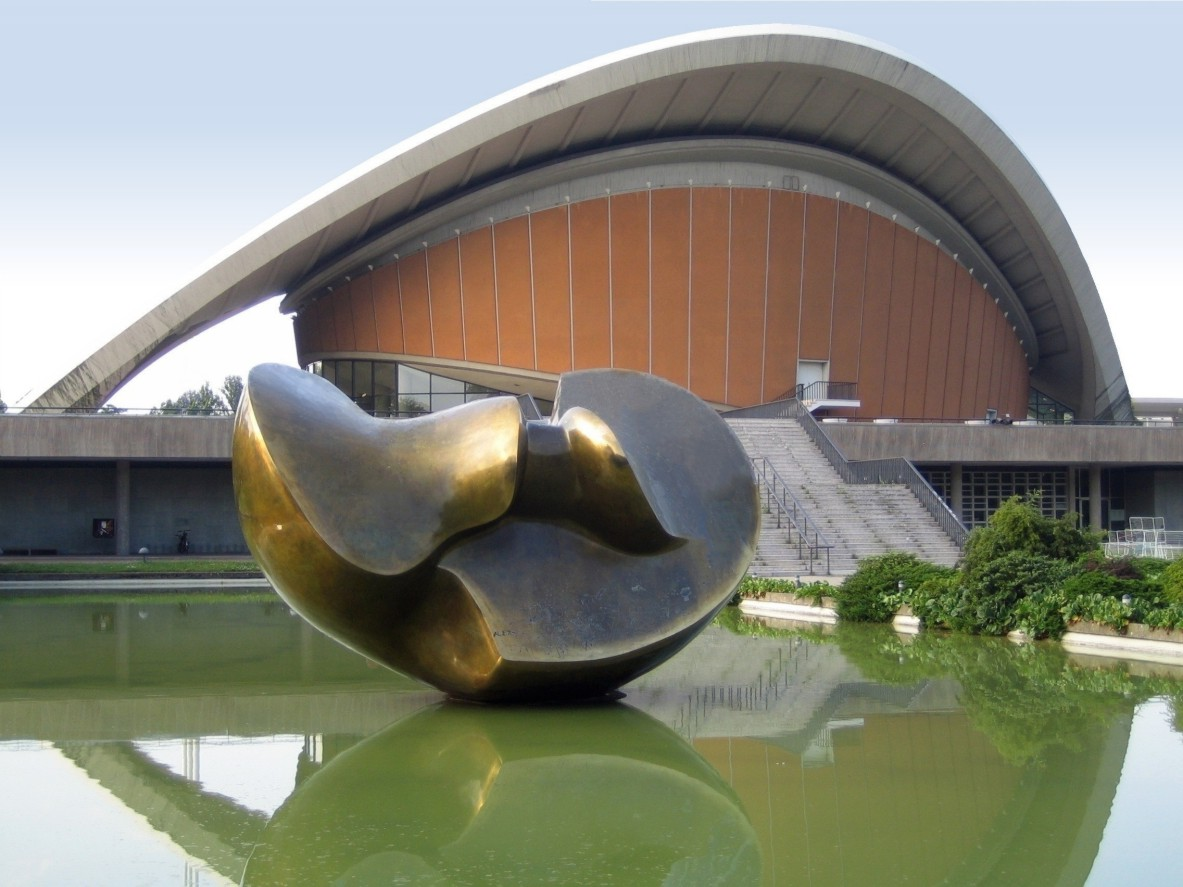
Haus der Kulturen der Welt

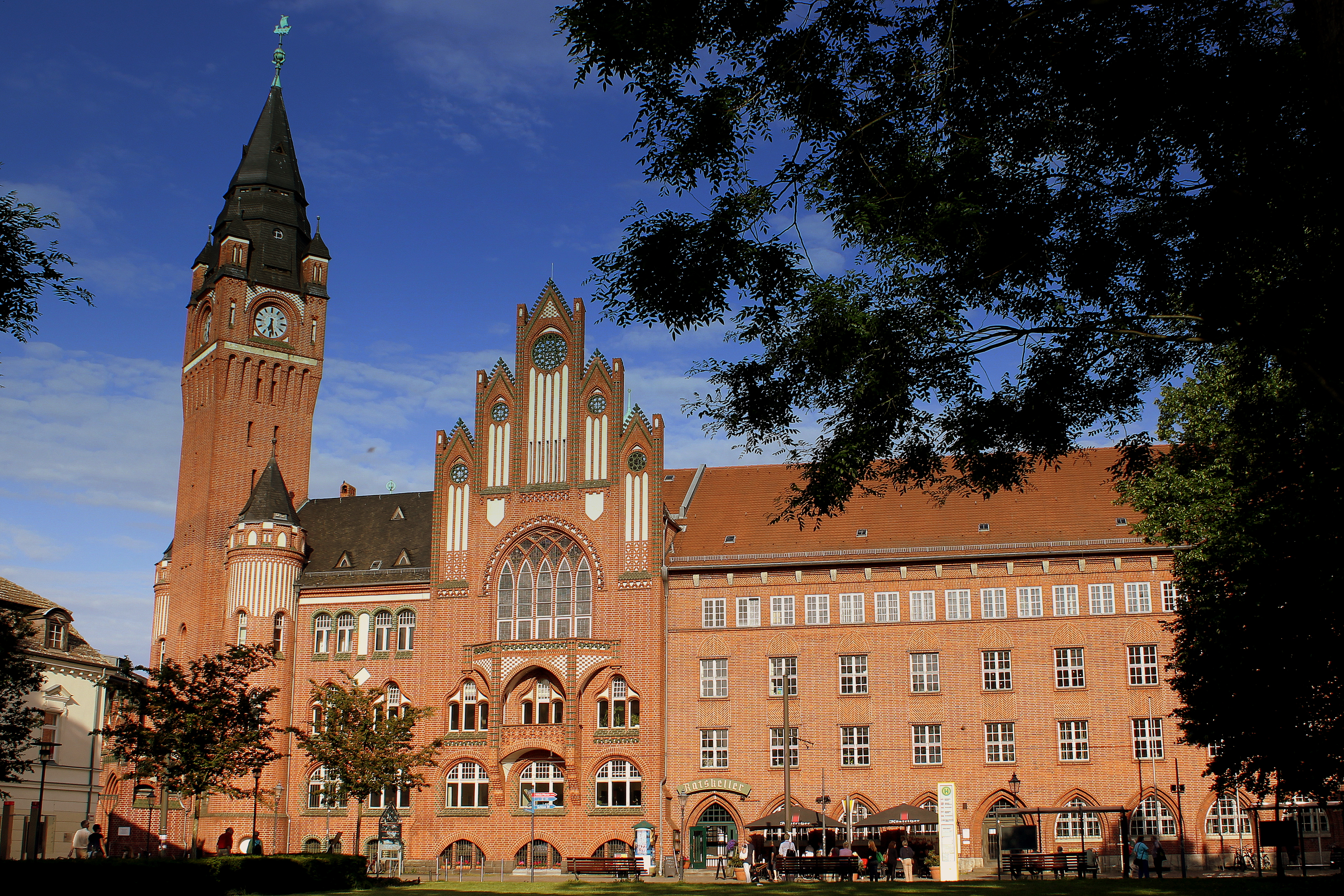
Rathaus Köpenick

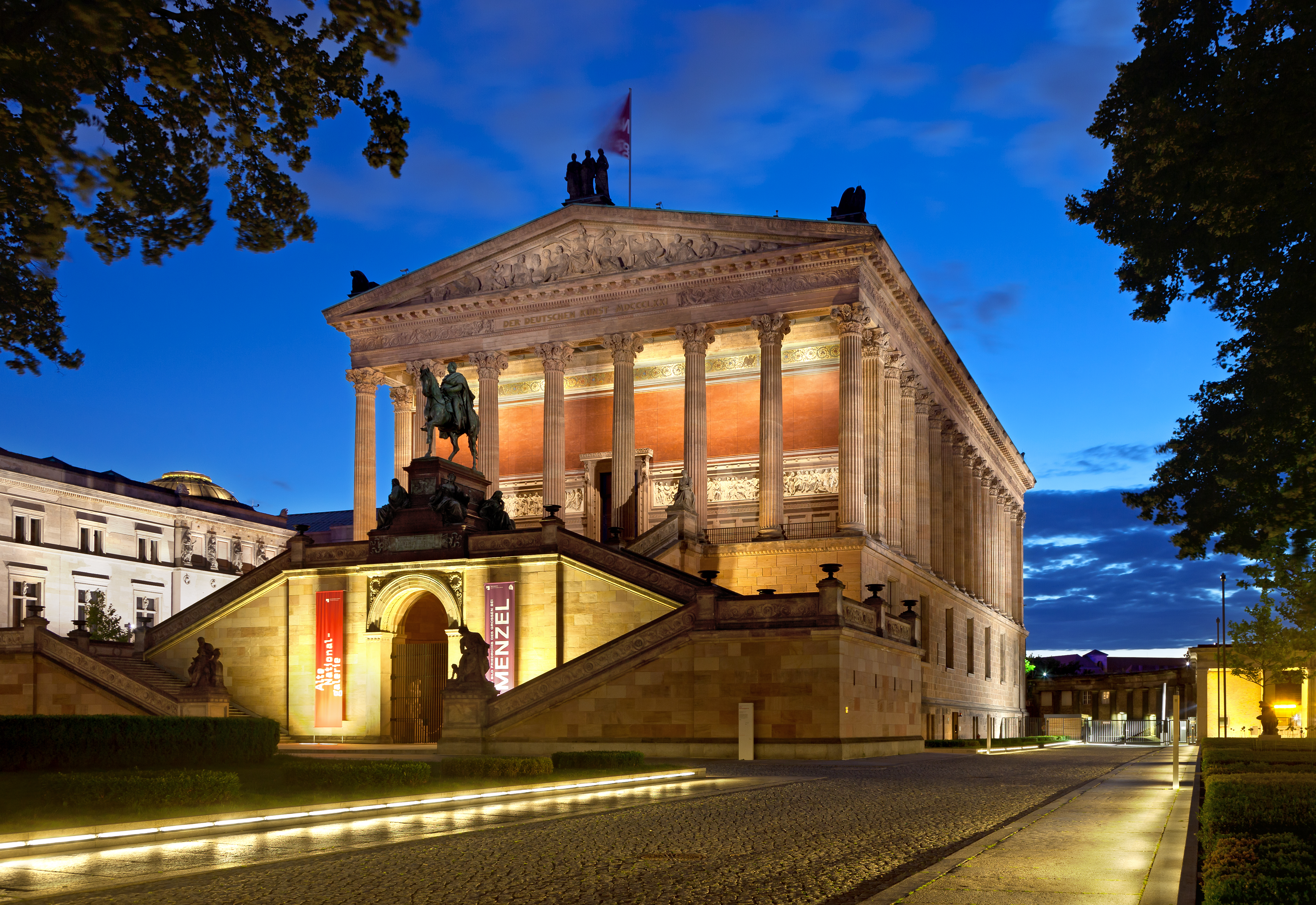
Alte Nationalgalerie

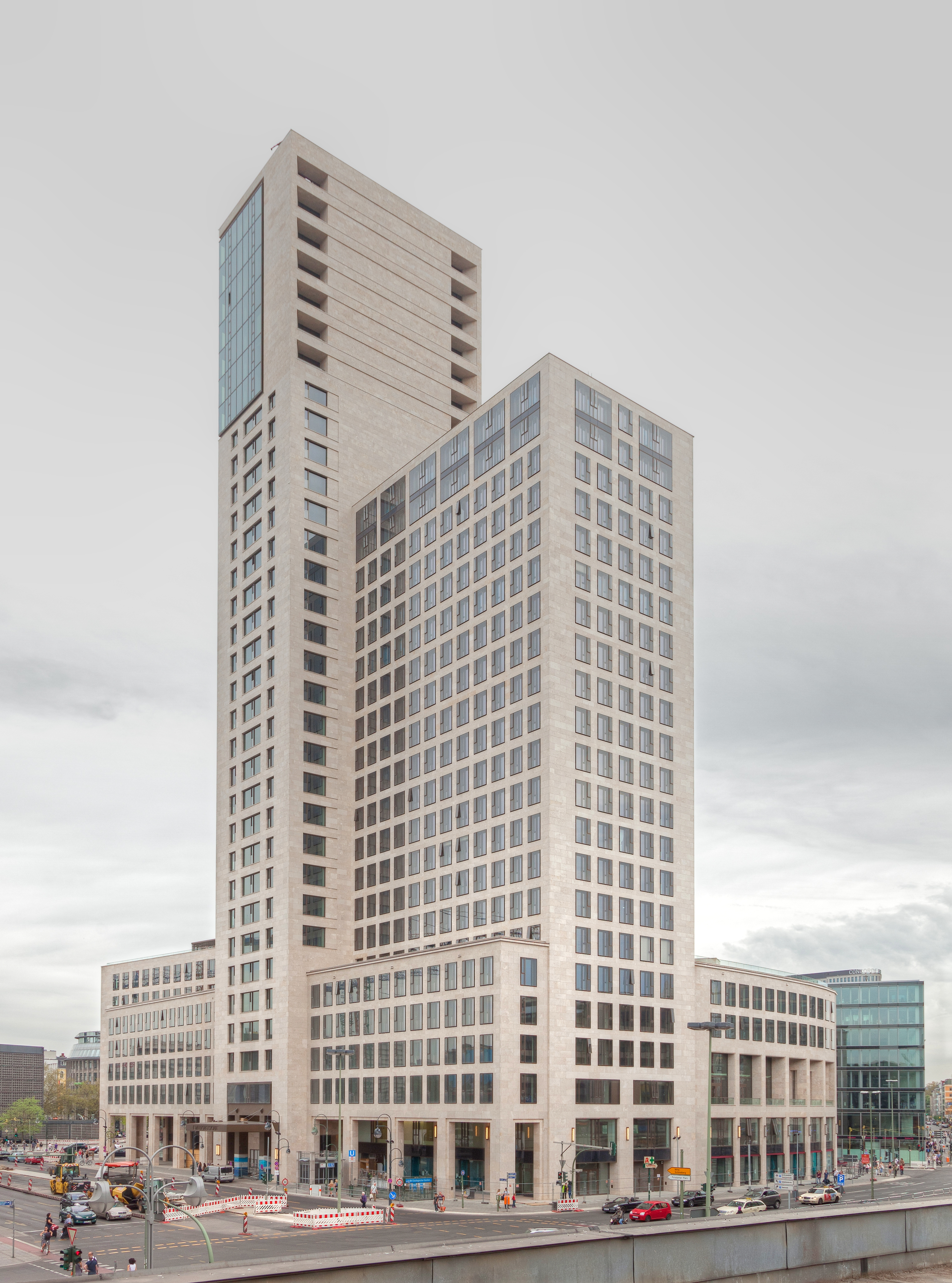
Zoofenster

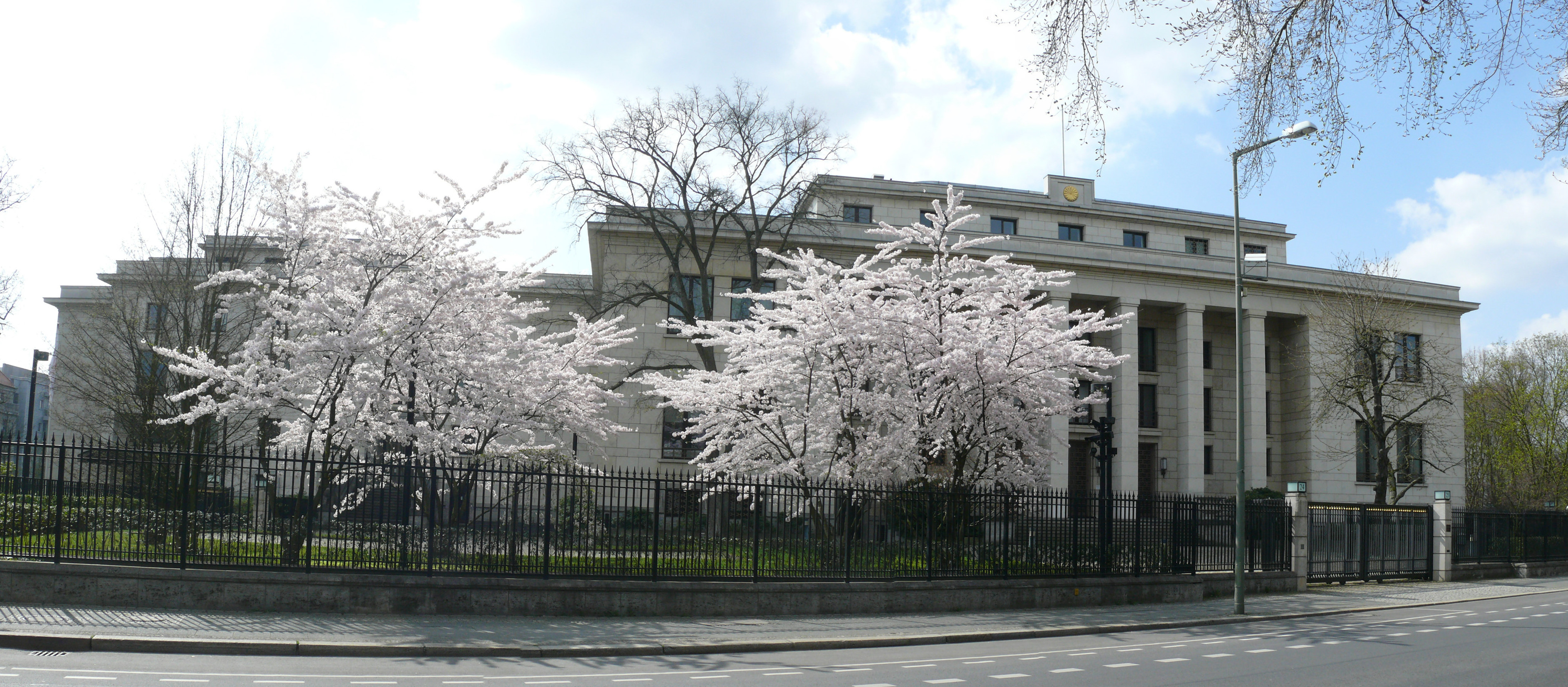
Japanese Embassy

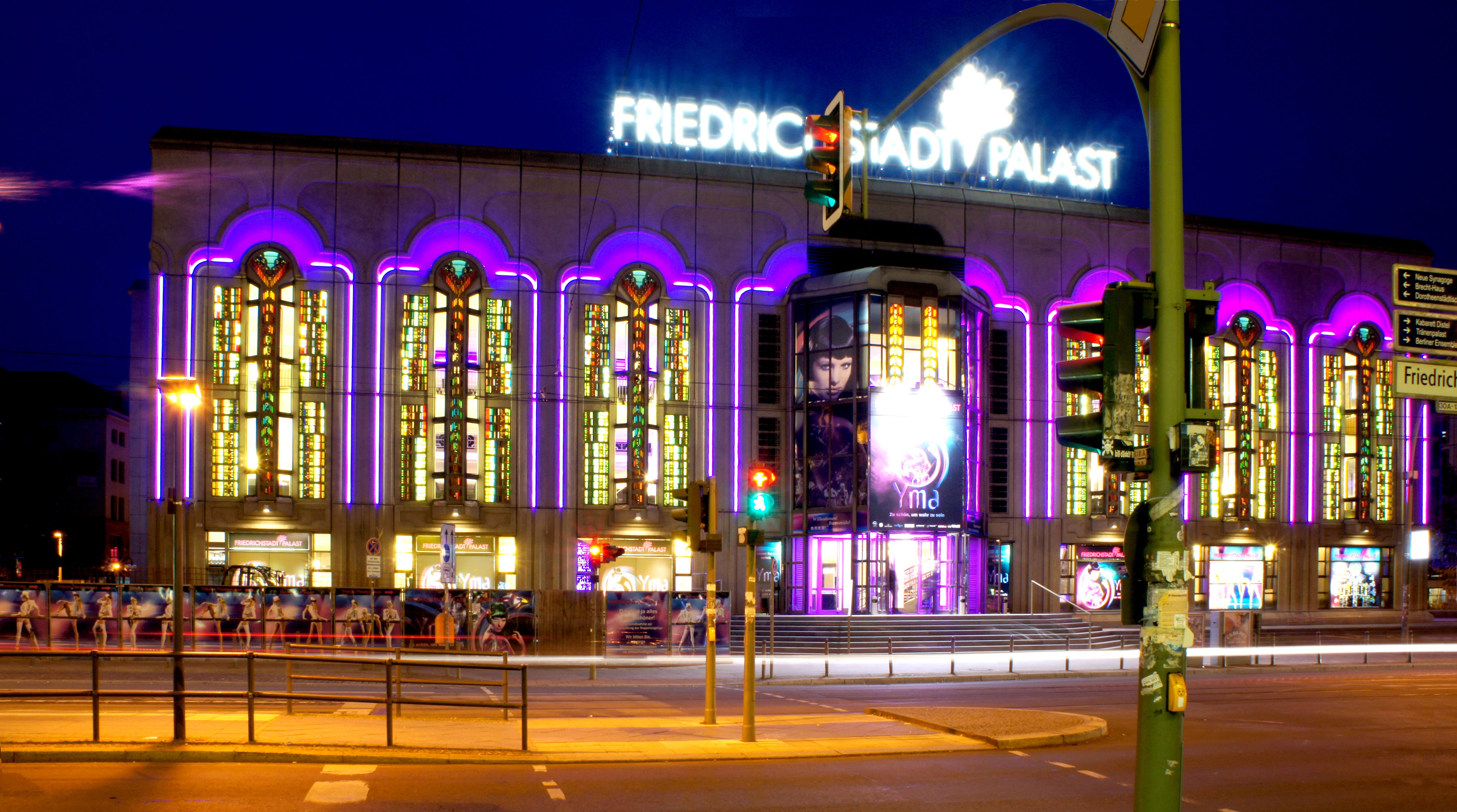
Friedrichstadt-Palast

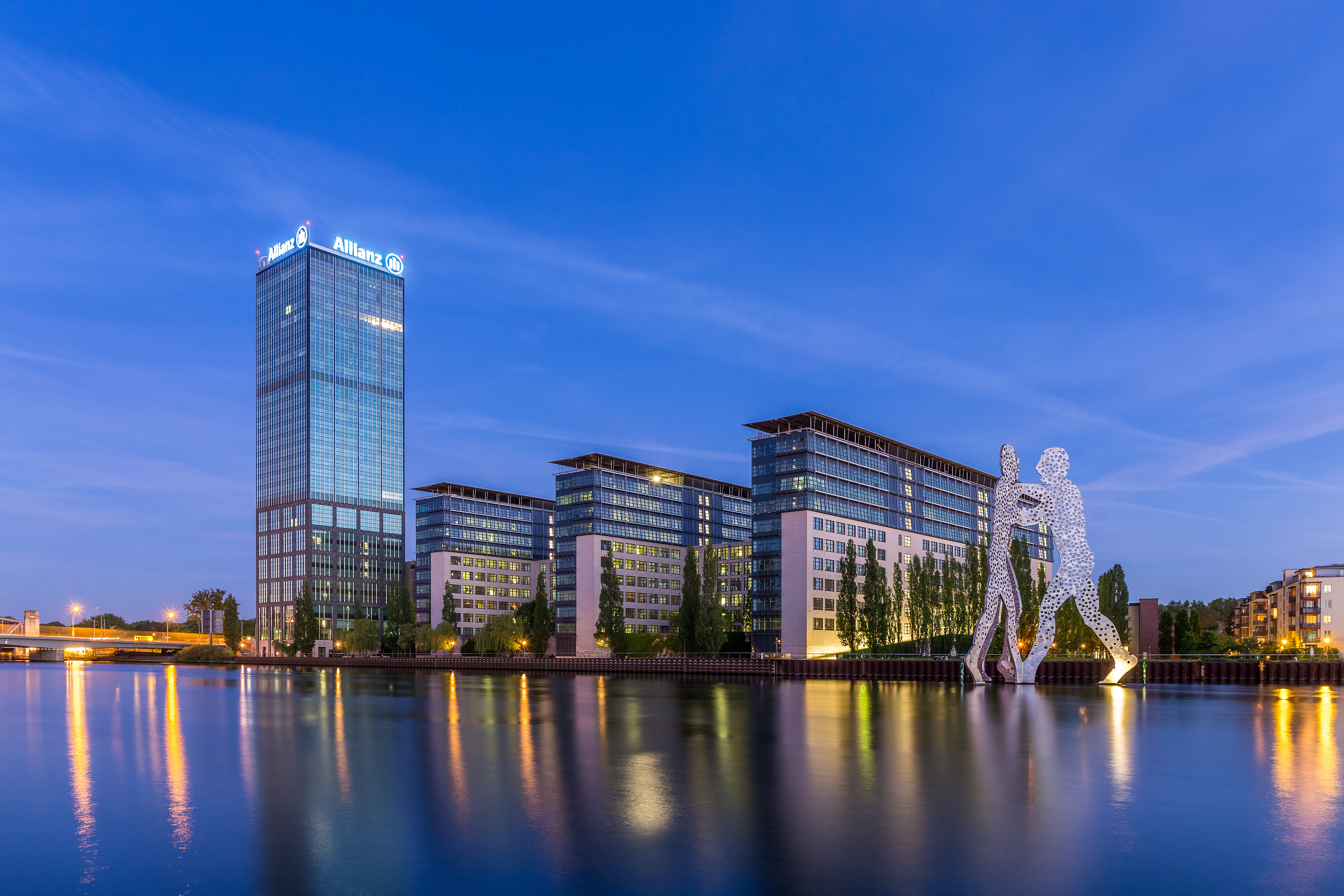
Treptowers

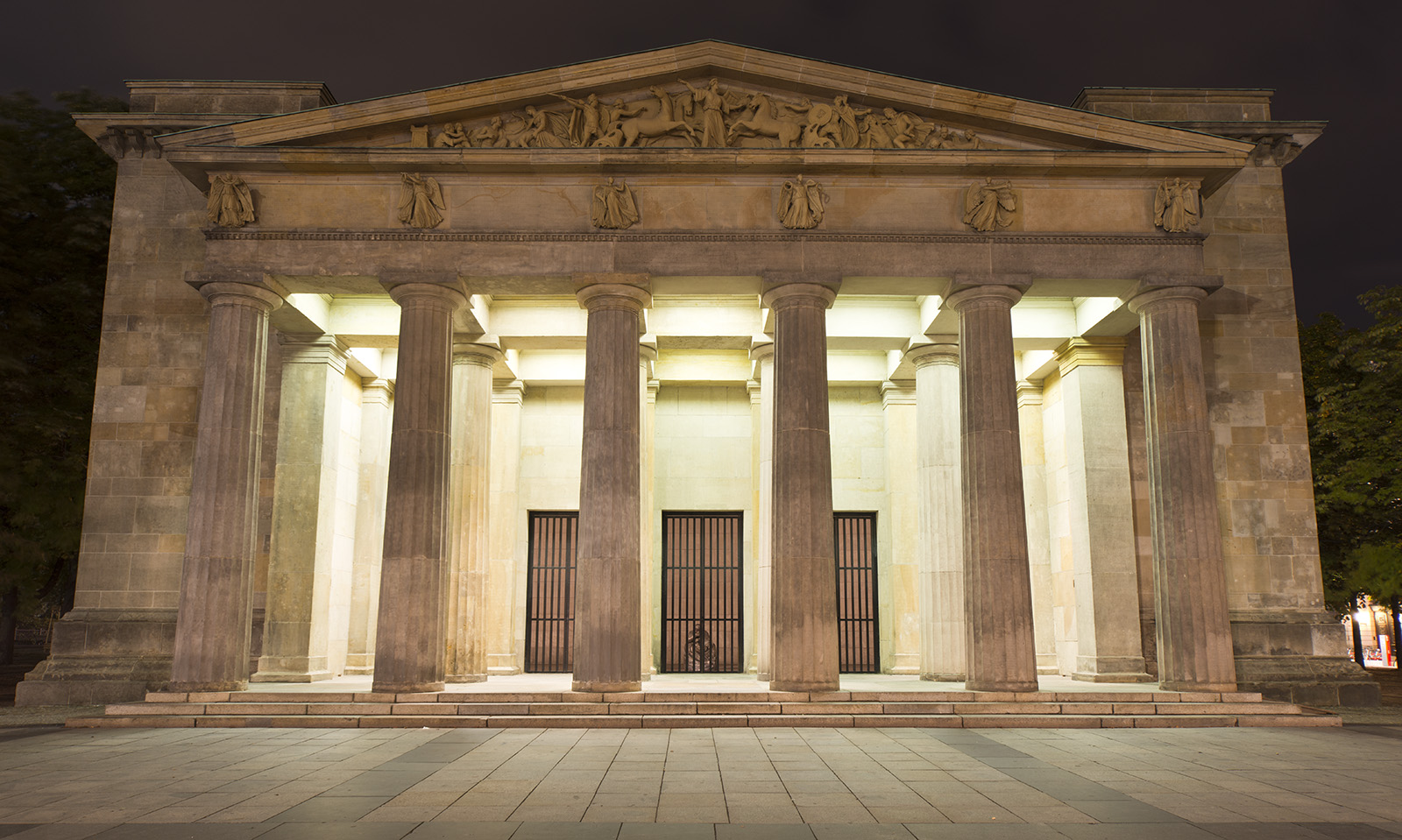
Neue Wache

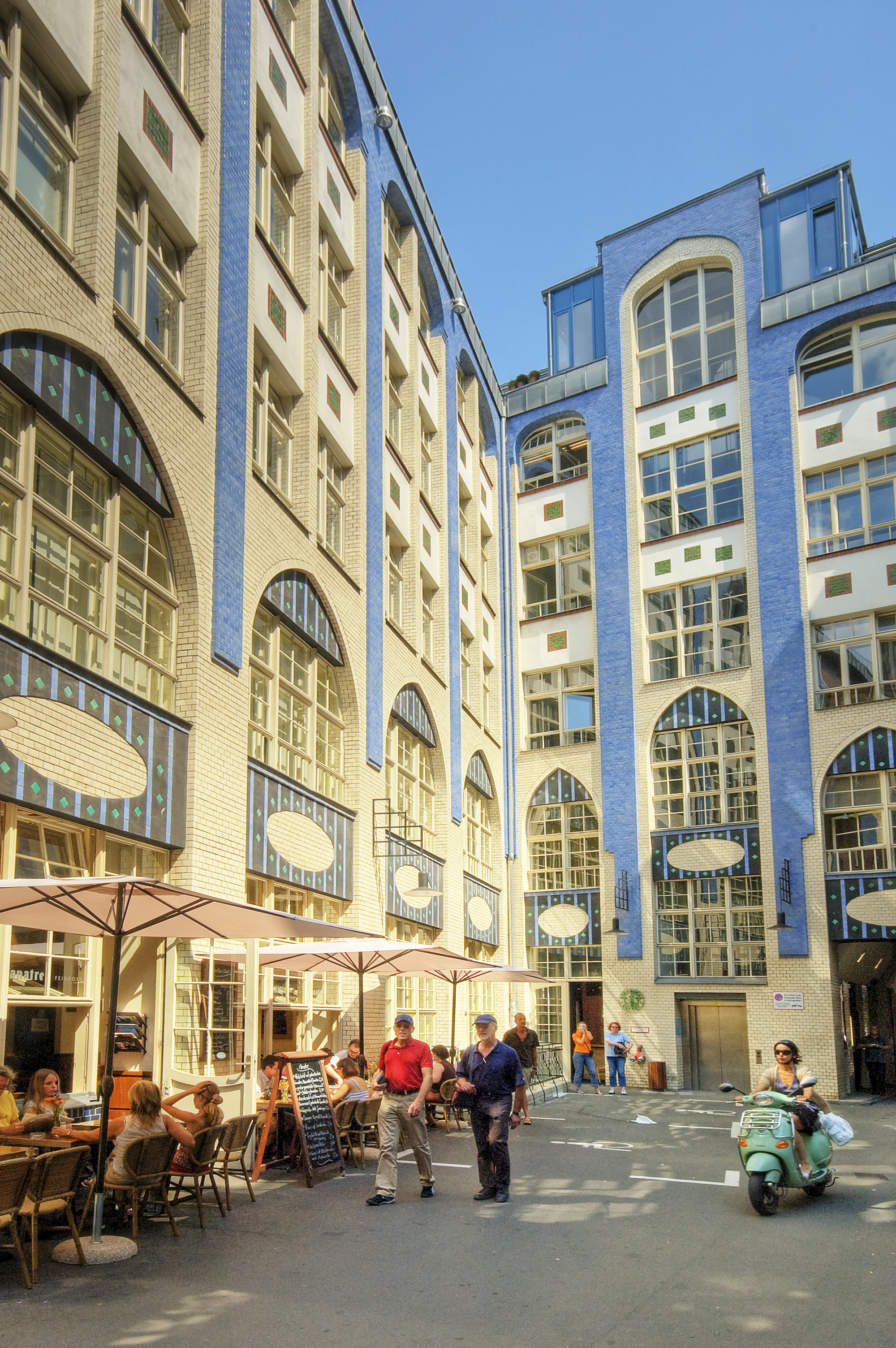
Inside the Hackesche Höfe

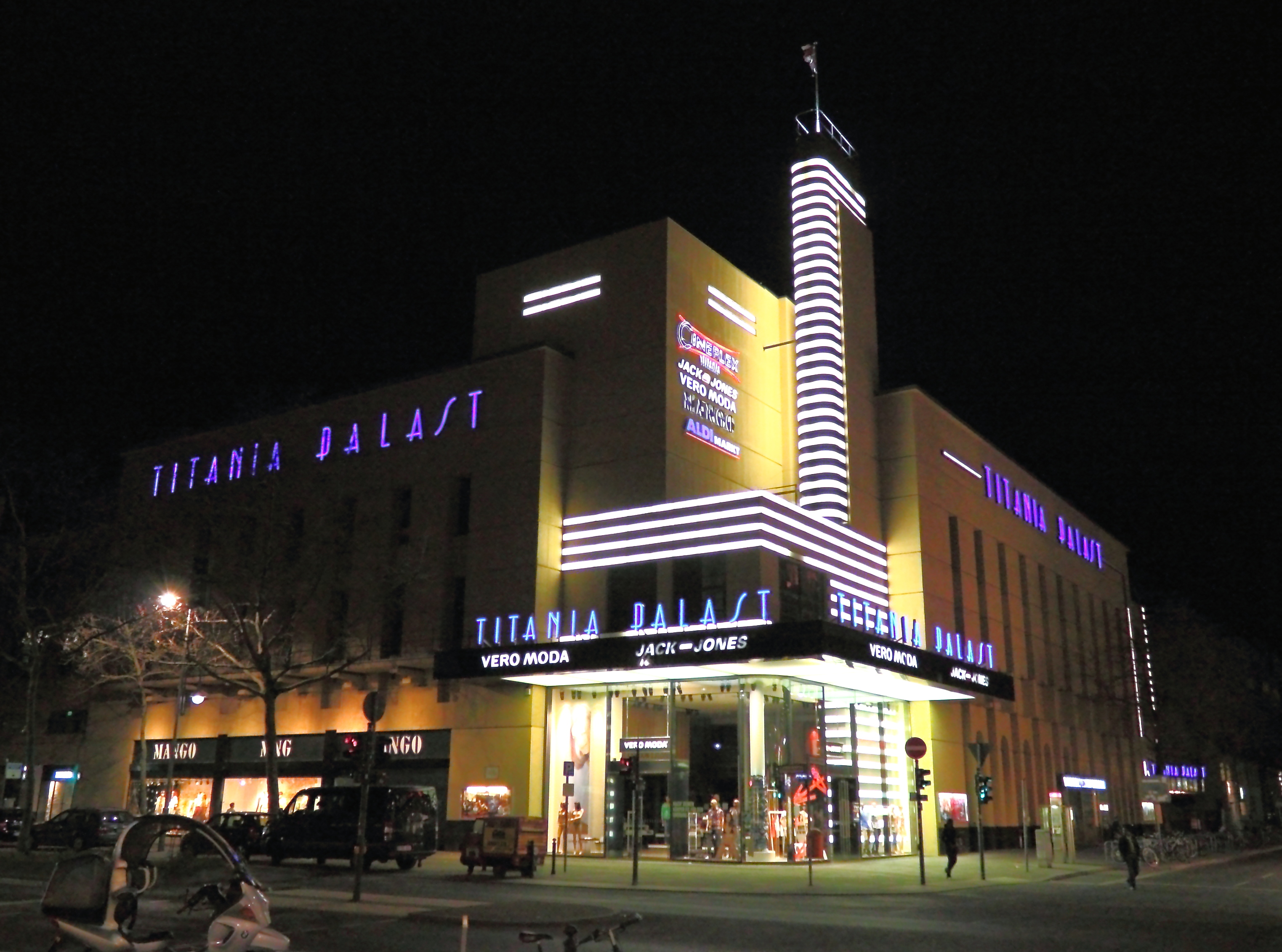
Titania Palast

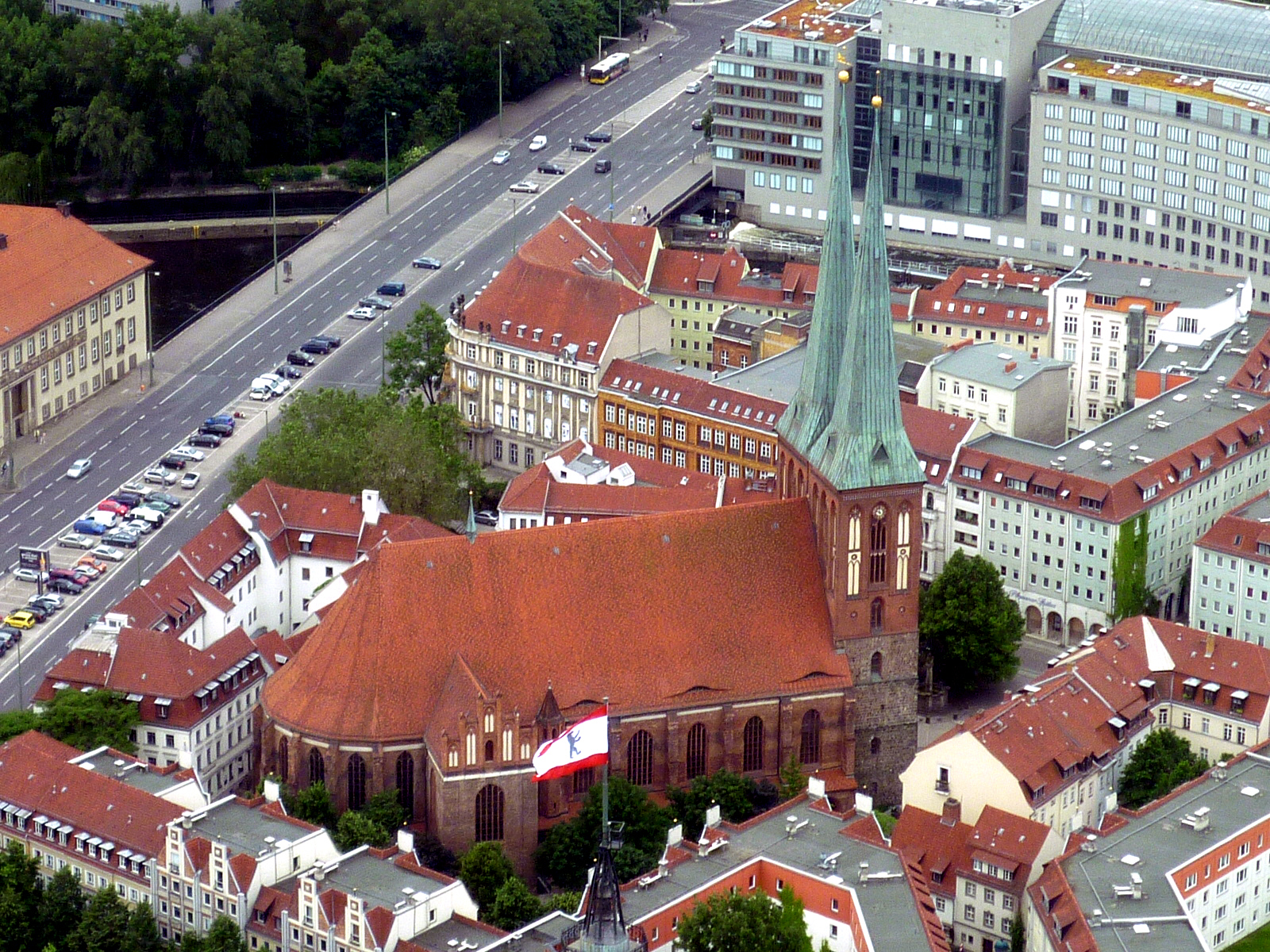
Nikolaiviertel with St. Nicholas' Church

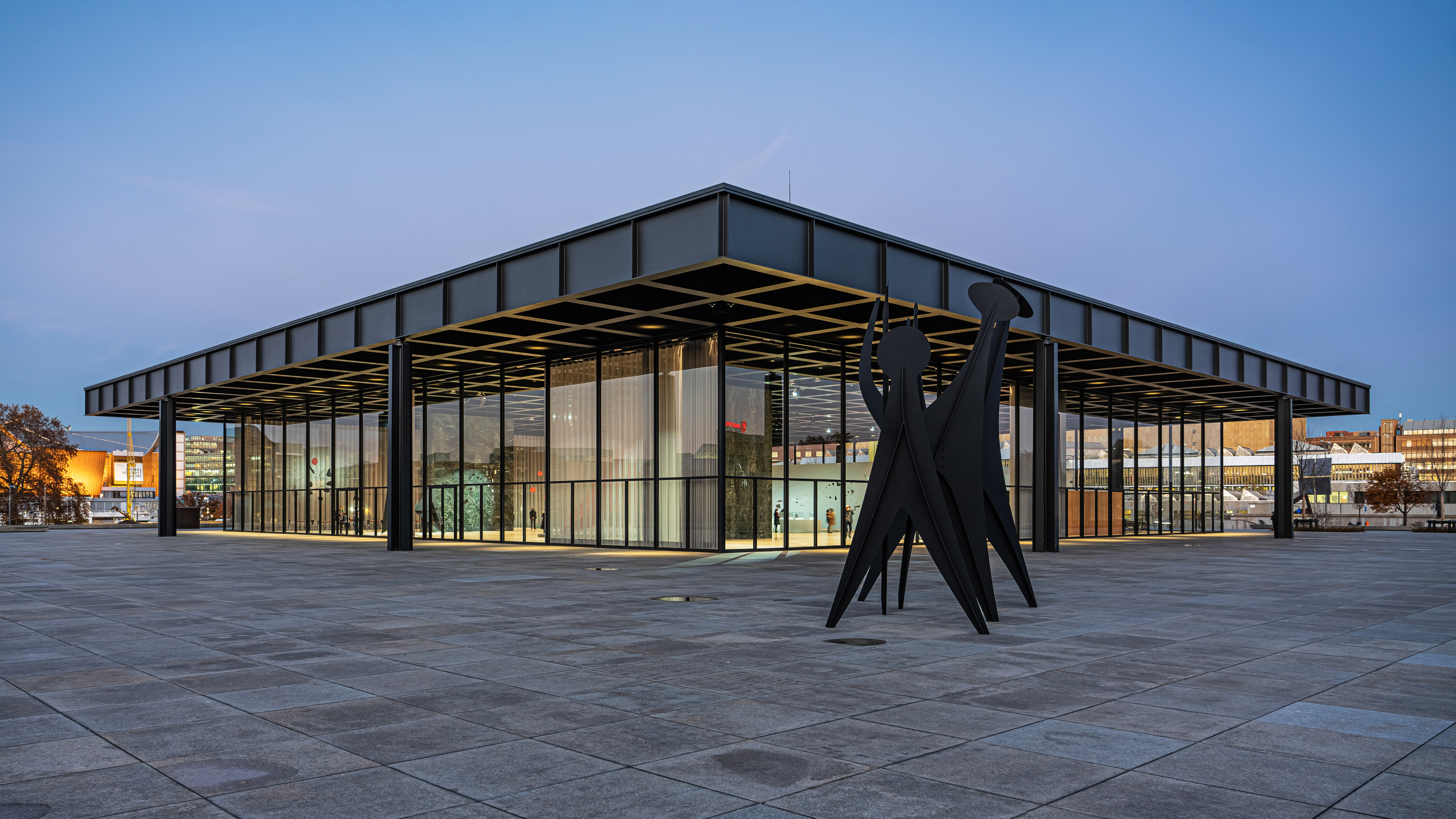
Neue Nationalgalerie

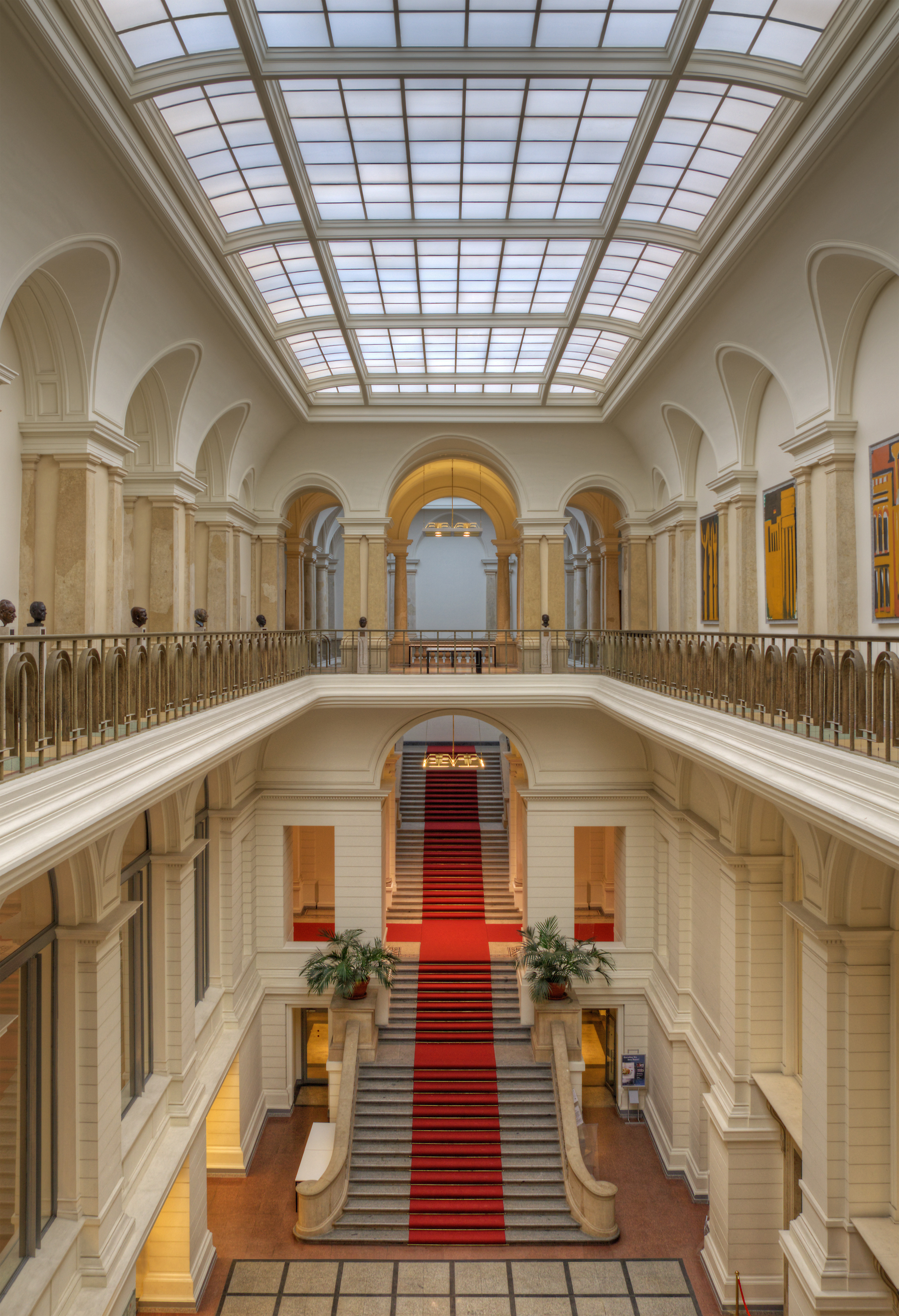
Abgeordnetenhaus (Berlin Parliament)

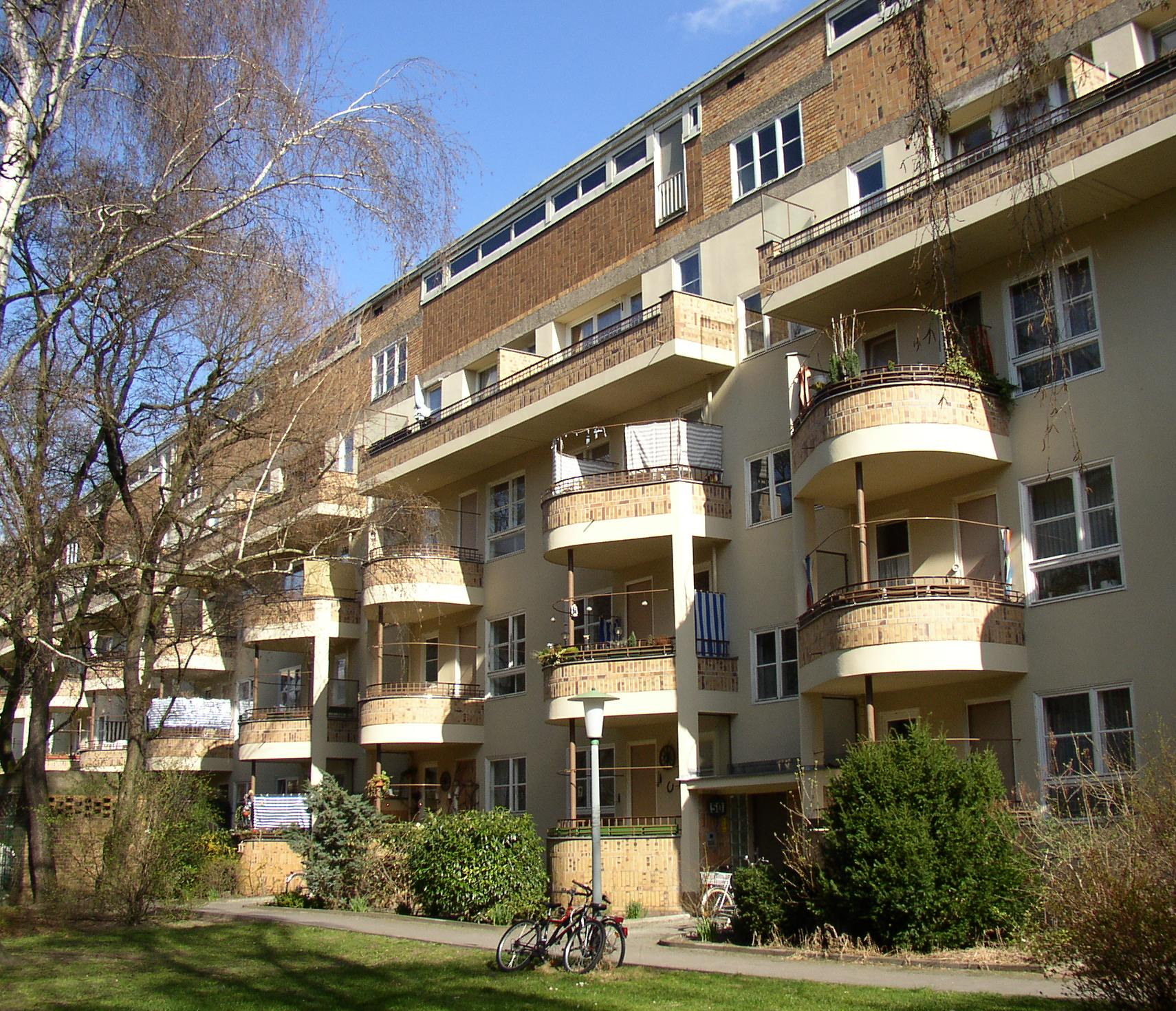
The UNESCO World Heritage Site Berlin Modernism Housing Estates

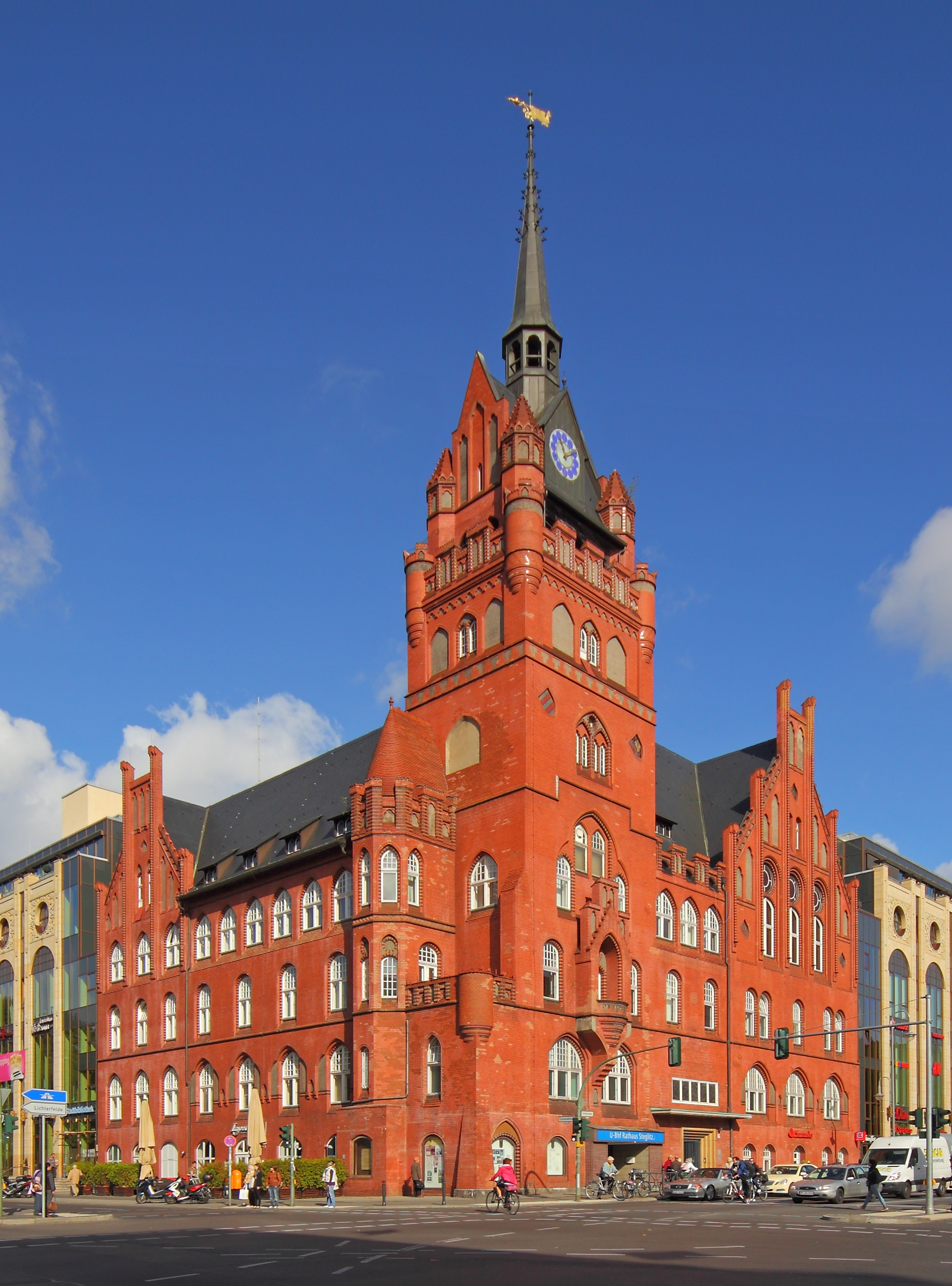
Rathaus Steglitz

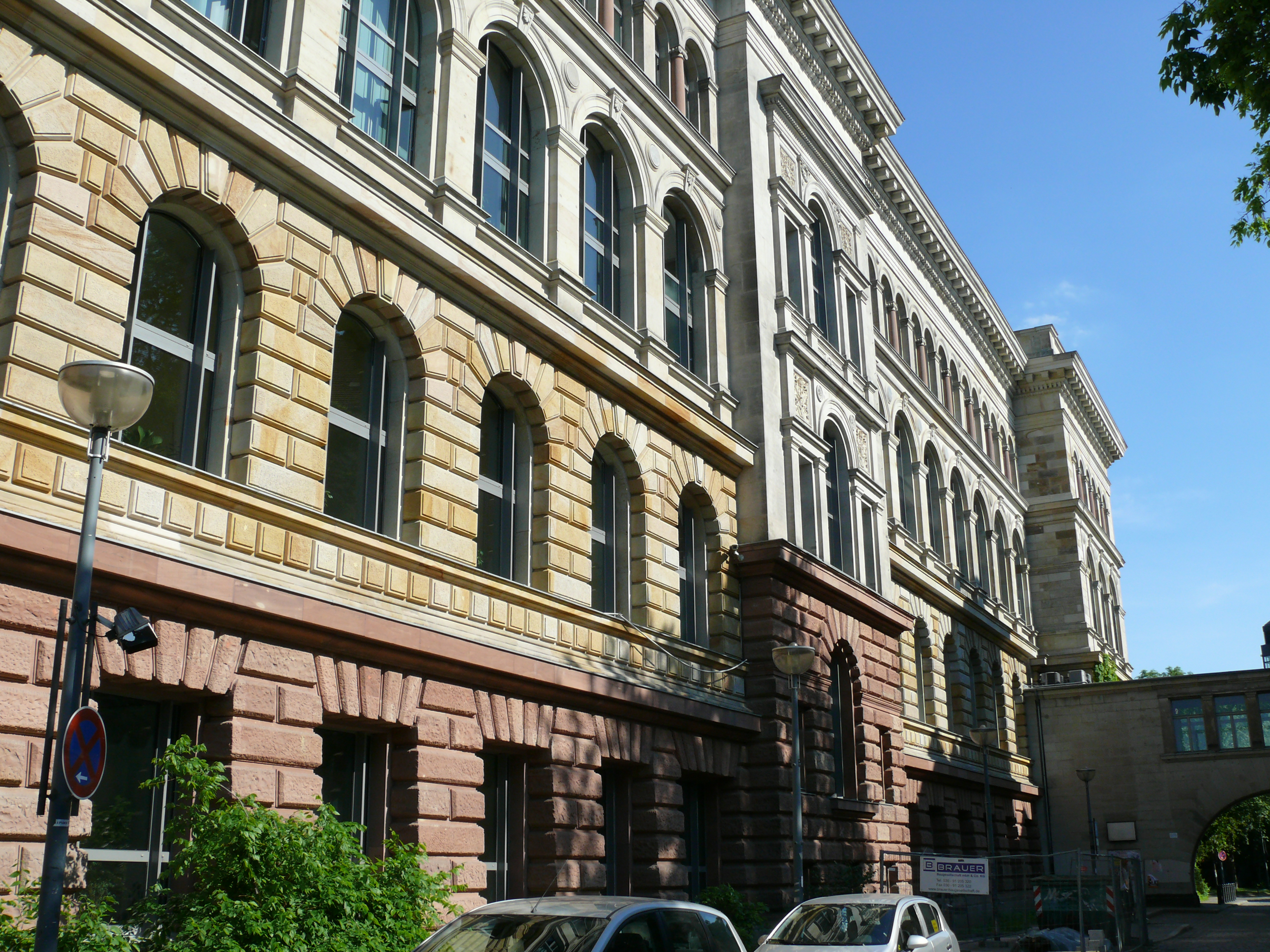
Technische Universität
