= Trams in Berlin =

Overview of the tram system of Berlin, Germany

Berlin tramway
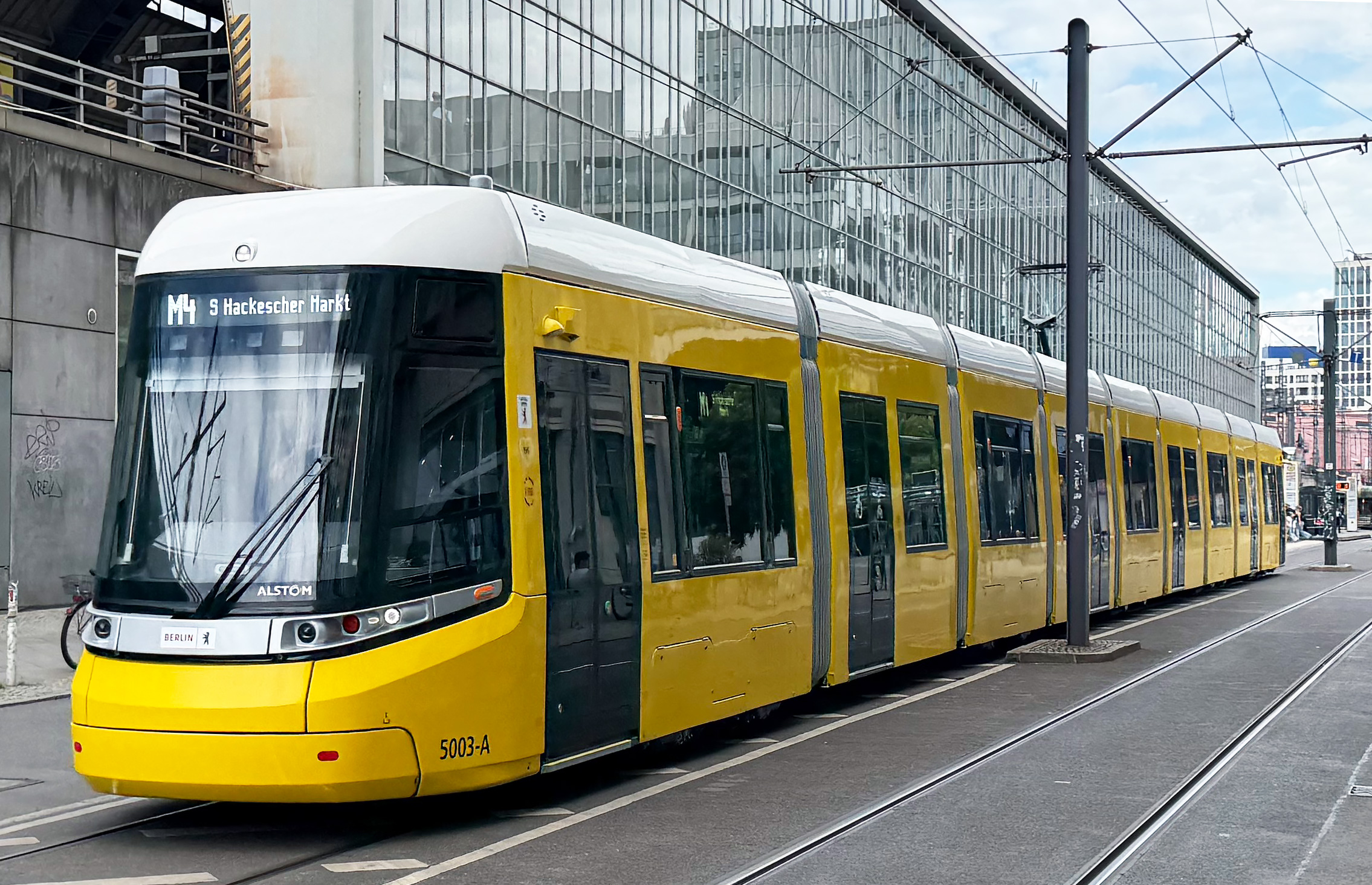
- Urbanliner - Berlin's latest tram generation

Operation
- Locale: Berlin, Germany

Statistics
Horsecar era: 1865–1910
- Status: Converted to electricity
- Track gauge: 1,435 mm (4 ft 8 1/2 in) standard gauge
- Propulsion system: Horses
Electric tram era: since 1895
- Status: Operational
- Lines: 22 (+2 suburban lines): 9 MetroTram lines; 13 regular tram lines
- Operator: Berliner Verkehrsbetriebe (BVG) (since 1929)
- Track gauge: 1,435 mm (4 ft 8 1/2 in) standard gauge
- Propulsion system: Electricity
- Electrification: 750 V DC Overhead
- Route length: 193 km (120 mi)
- Stops: over 800
- 2024: 226.1 million
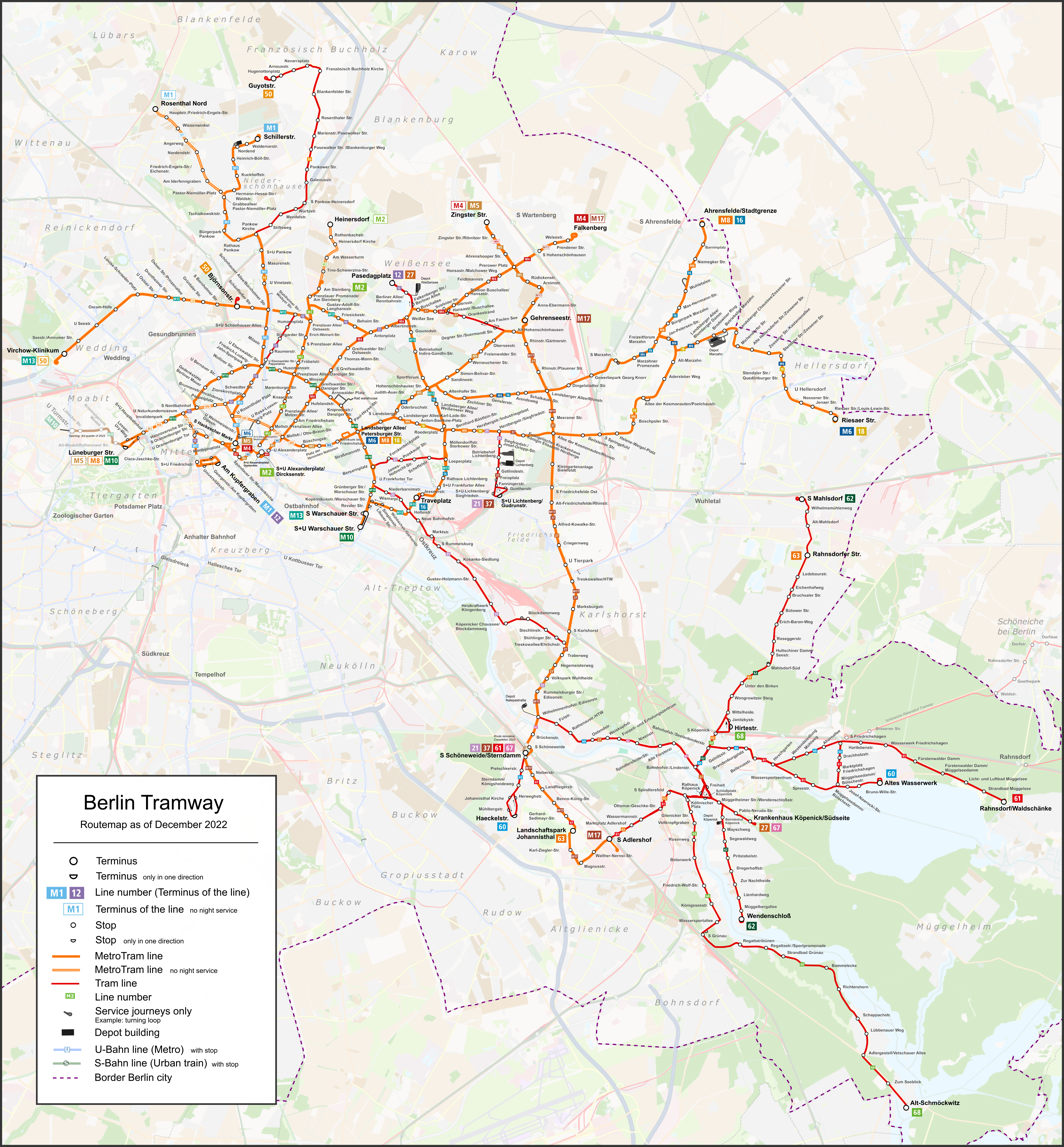
- Map of tram network, December 2022
- Website: https://www.bvg.de/en/connections Berliner Verkehrsbetriebe (BVG) (in English)

The Berlin tramway (German: Straßenbahn Berlin) is the main tram system in Berlin, Germany. It is one of the oldest tram networks in the world, dating back to 1865 and is operated by Berliner Verkehrsbetriebe (BVG), which was founded in 1929. It is notable for being the third-largest tram system in the world, after Melbourne and St. Petersburg. Berlin's tram system is made up of 22 lines that operate across a standard gauge network, with almost 800 stops and measuring almost 190 kilometres (120 mi) in route length and 430 kilometres (270 mi) in line length. Nine of the lines, called Metrotram, operate 24 hours a day and are identified with the letter "M" before their number; the other thirteen lines are regular city tram lines and are identified by just a line number.

Most of the current network is within the confines of the former East Berlin, as tram lines within West Berlin were replaced by buses during the division of Berlin. However, the first extension into West Berlin opened in 1994 on today's M13. In the eastern vicinity of the city there are also three private tram lines that are not part of the main system; the Potsdam tram system, with its own network of lines, is just to the south-west of Berlin.

== History ==
In 1865, a horse tramway was established in Berlin. In 1881, the world's first electric tram line was opened in the city. Numerous private and municipal operating companies constructed new routes, so by the end of the 19th century the network had developed quite rapidly, and the horse trams had been replaced by electric ones. By 1930, the network had a route length of over 630 km (391 mi) with more than 90 lines. In 1929, all operating companies were unified into the BVG. After World War II, BVG was divided into an eastern and a western company but was once again reunited in 1992, after the fall of East Germany. In West Berlin by 1967 the last tram lines had been shut down. With the exception of two lines constructed after German reunification, the Berlin tram continues to be limited to the eastern portion of Berlin.

=== Horse-drawn omnibuses ===
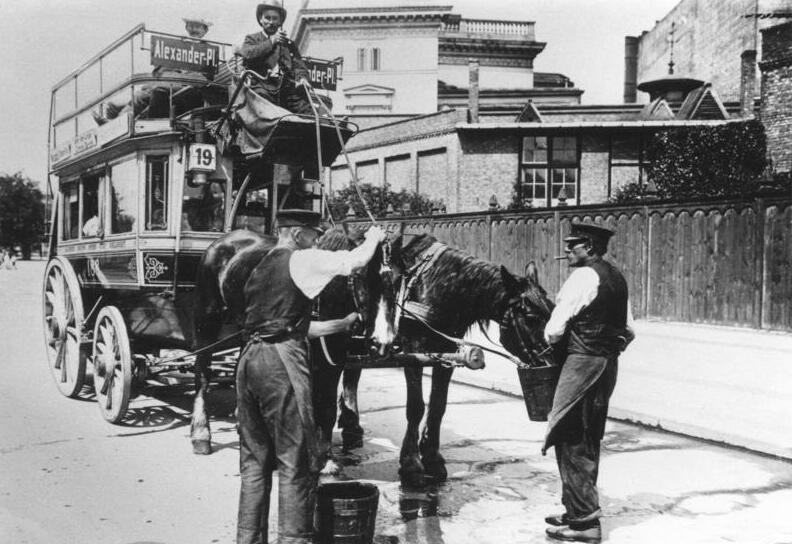
Berlin omnibus

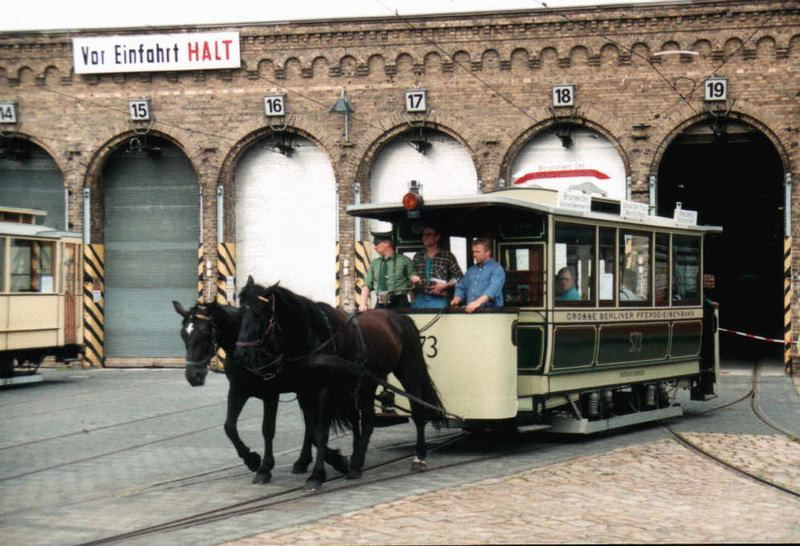
Horse tram car of the Große Berliner Pferde-Eisenbahn, built in 1885

The public transport system of Berlin is the oldest one in Germany. In 1825, the first horse-drawn omnibus line from Brandenburger Tor to Charlottenburg was opened by Simon Kremser, already with a timetable. The first omnibus service inside the city operated from 1840 between Alexanderplatz and Potsdamer Bahnhof. It was run by Israel Moses Henoch, who had run the cab service since 1815. On 1 January 1847, the Koncessionierte Berliner Omnibus Compagnie (Concessionary Berlin Bus Company) started its first omnibus line. The growing market witnessed the launch of numerous additional companies, with 36 bus companies in Berlin by 1864. Robert Walser, who lived in Berlin around 1906, published a prose piece about a Berlin horse-drawn omnibus titled "Full."

=== Horse trams ===
On 22 June 1865, the opening of Berlin's first horse tramway marked the beginning of the age of trams in Germany, stretching from Brandenburger Tor along today's Straße des 17. Juni (17 June Road) to Charlottenburg. Two months later, on 28 August, it was extended along Dorotheenstraße to Kupfergraben near today's Museumsinsel (Museum Island), a terminus which is still in service today. Like the omnibus, many companies took advantage of the new development and built horse-tram networks in all parts of today's urban area. In 1873, a route from Rosenthaler Platz to the Gesundbrunnen was opened, to be operated by the new Große Berliner Pferde-Eisenbahn (Great Berlin Horse Railway) which would later become the dominant company in Berlin under the name of Große Berliner Straßenbahn (GBS; Great Berlin Tramway).

=== Electrification ===
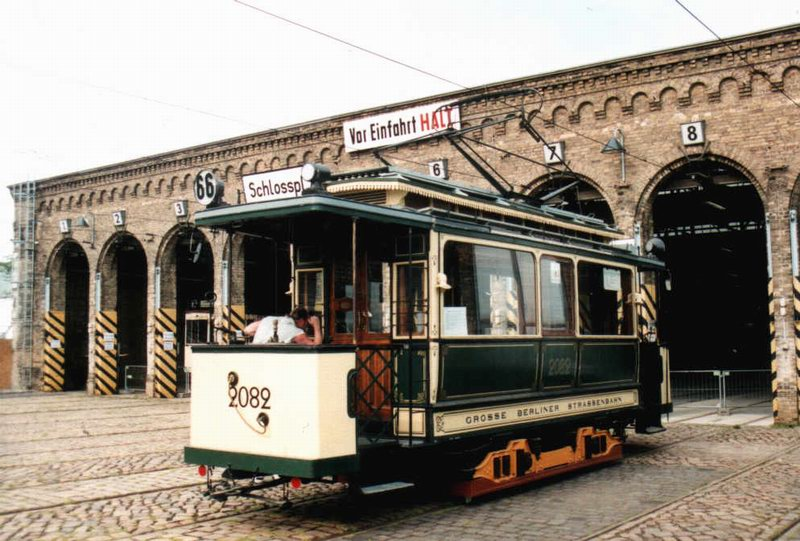
Electric car of the GBS, built in 1901

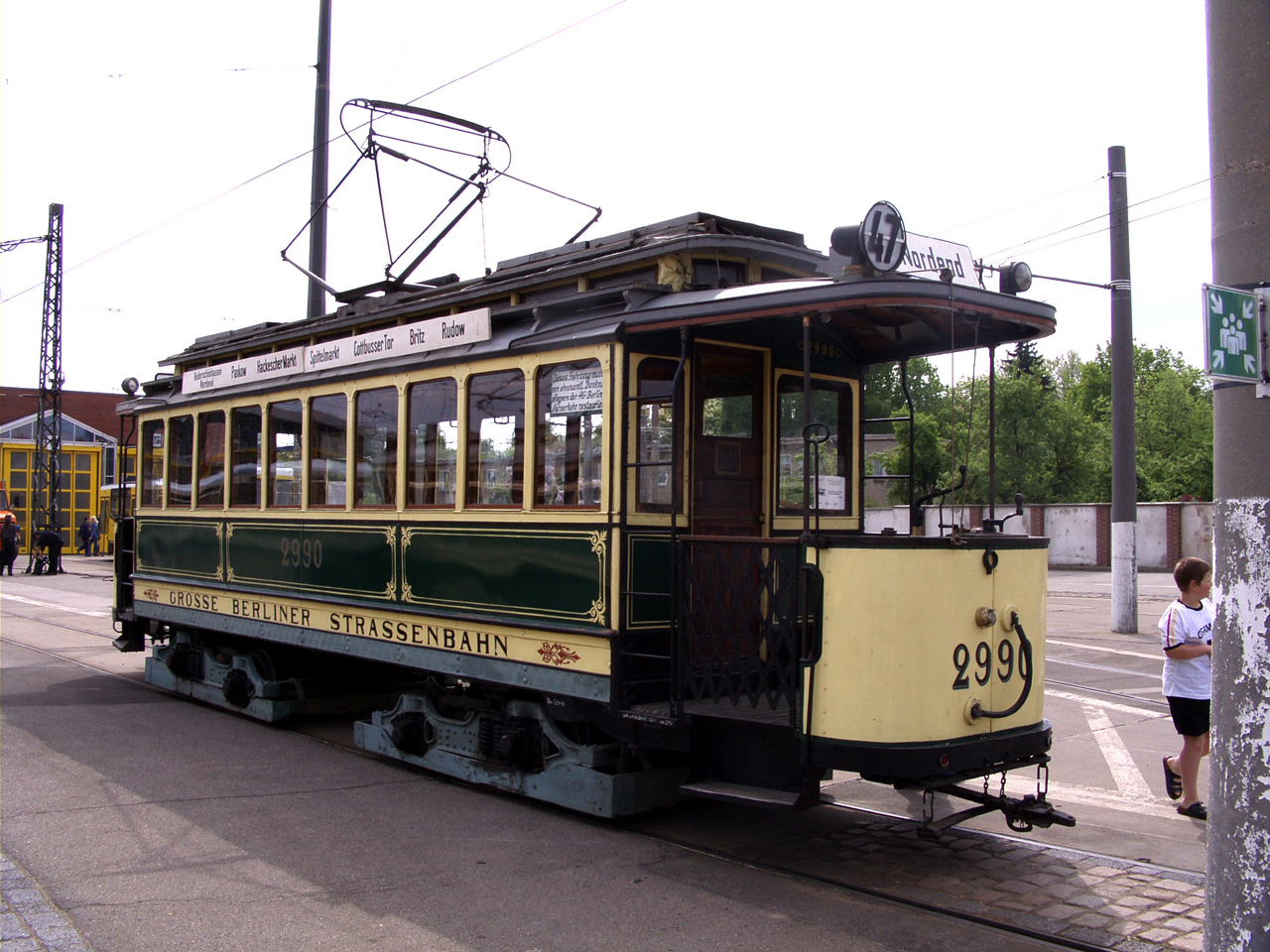
Car of Berlin's last class with open platforms, built in 1907

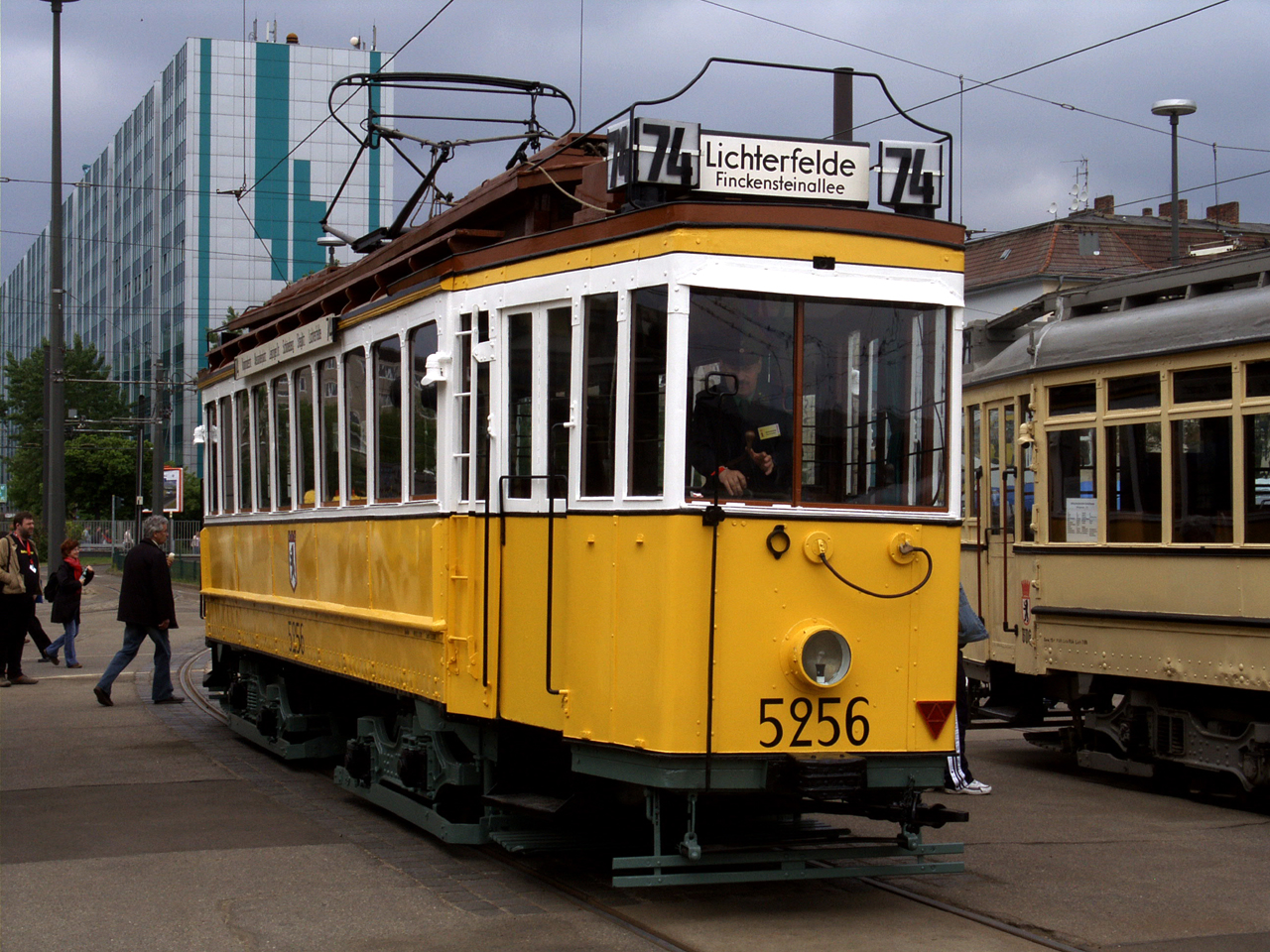
Car of the same class, modernized in 1925

On 16 May 1881, the region of Berlin again made transport history. In the village of Groß-Lichterfelde, which was incorporated into Berlin-Steglitz 39 years later, Werner von Siemens opened the world's first electric tramway. The electric tram in Groß-Lichterfelde was built to 1,000 mm (3 ft 3 3/8 in) metre gauge and ran from today's suburban station, Lichterfelde Ost, to the cadet school on Zehlendorfer Straße (today Finckensteinallee). Initially, the route was intended merely as a testing facility. Siemens named it an "elevated line taken down from its pillars and girders" because he wanted to build a network of electric elevated lines in Berlin. But the skeptical town council did not allow him to do this until 1902, when the first elevated line opened.

The first tests of electric traction on Berlin's standard gauge began on 1 May 1882, with overhead supply and in 1886 with batteries, were not very successful. Electric traction of standard-gauge trams in Berlin was definitively established in 1895. The first tram line with an overhead track supply ran in an industrial area near Berlin-Gesundbrunnen station. The first line in a more inhabited area operated with batteries for its first year; a catenary was installed four years later. In 1902, electrification with overhead wiring had been completed, except for a very small number of lines on the periphery.

The last horse-drawn tram line closed in 1910.

=== Underground trams ===
On 28 December 1899, it became possible to travel underground, even under the Spree, upon completion of the Spreetunnel between Stralau and Treptow. Owing to structural problems, it was closed on 25 February 1932. From 1916 to 1951, the tram had a second tunnel, the Lindentunnel, passing under the well-known boulevard Unter den Linden.

=== Great variety of companies until the formation of the BVG ===
The history of tram companies of the Berlin Strassenbahn is very complicated. Besides the private companies, which often changed because of takeovers, mergers, and bankruptcies, the cities of Berlin, Spandau, Köpenick, Rixdorf; the villages Steglitz, Mariendorf, Britz, Niederschönhausen, Friedrichshagen, Heiligensee and Französisch Buchholz, and the Kreis Teltow (Teltow district) had municipal tram companies.

The most important private operating company was the Große Berliner Pferde-Eisenbahn (Great Berlin Horse Railway), which called itself Große Berliner Straßenbahn (GBS) (Great Berlin Tramway) after commencing electrification. GBS acquired nearly all of the other companies through the years. In 1920, the GBS merged with the municipal companies BESTAG and SSB to become the Berliner Straßenbahn (Berlin Tramway), which was reorganized in 1929 into the newly formed municipal Berliner Verkehrs-AG (BVG) (Berlin Transport Company). Besides the tramway, the BVG also took over the elevated and underground rail lines and the bus routes which were previously operated primarily by the Allgemeine Berliner Omnibus-Actien-Gesellschaft (ABOAG) (General Berlin Bus Corporation).

The following table includes all companies that operated tramways in today's Berlin before the formation of the BVG. The background color of each line marks the drive method which the respective company used to serve their lines at the time of the formation (blue = horse tram, yellow = steam tram, white = electric tram, red = benzole tram).

First line opened	Operating company	Gauge (mm)	Takeover date	Taken over by	Special remarks
1865-06-22	Berliner Pferde-Eisenbahn-Gesellschaft (BPfEG)	1,435	1894-09-26	BChS	first horse tram in Germany
1871-11-01	Westend-Terrain-Gesellschaft H. Quistorp & Co.	1,435	1878	BPfEG	
1873-07-08	Große Berliner Pferde-Eisenbahn (GBPfE)	1,435	1898-01-25	GBS	
1877-01-01	Neue Berliner Pferdebahn-Gesellschaft (NBPfG)	1,435	1900-01-01	GBS	
1879-04-01	Große Internationale Pferde-Eisenbahn-Gesellschaft (GIPfEG)	1,435	1886	GBPfE	founded already in March 1872
1881-05-16	Elektrische Straßenbahn der Gemeinde Groß-Lichterfelde	1,000	1895-03-04	ESGLSS	Germany's first electric tramway
1882-10-18	Cöpenicker Pferde-Eisenbahn (CPE)	1,435	1903	SSC	
1885-06-13	Pferde-Eisenbahn der Gemeinde Rixdorf	1,435	1887-01-01	GBPfE	
1886-05-05	Davy, Donath & Co.	1,435	1888-12-22	BDK	
1887-08-06	Pferde-Eisenbahn der Gemeinde Mariendorf	1,435	1888-01-01	GBPfE	
1888-05-18	Wilmersdorf-Schmargendorfer Dampfstraßenbahn Reymer & Masch (WSD)	1,435	1888-12-22	BDK	
1888-07-01	Dampfstraßenbahn Groß-Lichterfelde – Seehof – Teltow	1,435	1891-05-31	DLSTS	
1888-12-22	Berliner Dampfstraßenbahn-Konsortium (BDK)	1,435	1898-10-01	WBV	also operated some horse trams
1891-05-17	Straßenbahn Friedrichshagen	1,000	1906-12-16	SSC	in 1894 taken over by the village, electrificated and regauged to standard gauge as of the takeover by SSC
1891-05-31	Dampfstraßenbahn Groß-Lichterfelde – Seehof – Teltow – Stahnsdorf	1,435	1906-04-01	TKb	
1891-06-04	Pferdebahn Tegeler Chaussee – Tegel	1,435	1891-06-04	GBPfE	
1891-08-01	Pferde-Eisenbahn der Gemeinde Britz	1,435	1891-08-01	GBPfE	
1892-06-05	Spandauer Straßenbahn Simmel, Matzky & Müller (SpS)	1,000	1920-12-08	Berliner Straßenbahn	on 1894-09-01 management taken over by Allgemeine Deutsche Kleinbahn-Gesellschaft (ADKG), electrification finished on 1896-03-18, from 1899-03-04 management by AEG, regauged to standard gauge on 1907-10-26, bought by the city of Spandau on 1909-07-01
1892-07-01	Pferde-Eisenbahn der Gemeinde Niederschönhausen	1,435	1892-07-01	GBS	
1894-09-26	Berlin-Charlottenburger Straßenbahn (BChS)	1,435	1919-05-15	GBS	electrification finished on 1900-10-01
1895-03-04	Elektrische Straßenbahnen Groß-Lichterfelde – Lankwitz – Steglitz – Südende (ESGLSS)	1,000	1906-04-01	TKb	
1895-09-10	Siemens & Halske	1,435	1899-07-01	BESTAG	
1898-01-25	Große Berliner Straßenbahn (GBS)	1,435	1920-10-01	Berliner Straßenbahn	electrification finished on 1902-12-15, bought by the Zweckverband Groß-Berlin on 1909-09-20
1898-10-01	Westliche Berliner Vorortbahn (WBV)	1,435	1919-05-15	GBS	also operated some horse trams, electrification finished on 1900-06-19
1899-07-01	Berliner Elektrische Straßenbahn-AG (BESTAG)	1,435	1920-12-01	Berliner Straßenbahn	
1899-07-01	Südliche Berliner Vorortbahn	1,435	1919-05-15	GBS	
1899-10-21	Straßenbahn Berlin-Hohenschönhausen	1,435	1906-12-10	NBSNO	
1899-12-18	Gesellschaft für den Bau von Untergrundbahnen (Straßenbahn Schlesischer Bahnhof – Treptow) (SST)	1,435	1909-06-22	Berliner Ostbahnen	opened the Spreetunnel
1901-08-15	Straßenbahn Niederschöneweide – Cöpenick (SNC)	1,435	1909-06-22	Berliner Ostbahnen	
1901-10-01	Gesellschaft für elektrische Hoch- und Untergrundbahnen in Berlin (tramway line Warschauer Brücke-Zentralviehhof)	1,435	1928-04-01	BSBG	on 1910-01-01 tram line was sold to SSB, instead of it opening of a new tram line from Warschauer Brücke to Scharnweber-/Gürtelstraße, later extended to Wagnerplatz (today Roedeliusplatz) in Lichtenberg
1903	Städtische Straßenbahn Cöpenick (SSC)	1,435	1920-10-01	GBS	
1904–07	Pferde-Eisenbahn der Gemeinde Französisch-Buchholz	1,435	1907-12-19	BESTAG	electrification as of takeover by BESTAG
1905-12-03	Straßenbahn der Gemeinde Steglitz	1,435	1921-04-16	Berliner Straßenbahn	
1906-04-01	Teltower Kreisbahnen (TKb)	1,000/1,435	1921-04-16	Berliner Straßenbahn	steam tram of DLSTS was electrificated on 1907-03-30
1906-12-10	Neue Berliner Straßenbahn Nordost (NBSNO)	1,435	1910-05-03	NÖBV	
1908-03-23	Elektrische Straßenbahn Spandau-Nonnendamm	1,435	1914-10-01	SpS	founded by Siemens & Halske
1908-07-01	Städtische Straßenbahnen Berlin (SSB)	1,435	1920-10-01	Berliner Straßenbahn	
1909-06-22	Berliner Ostbahnen	1,435	1920-05-01	GBS	
1910-05-03	Nordöstliche Berliner Vorortbahn (NÖBV)	1,435	1919-05-15	GBS	
1910-08-07	Straßenbahn des Flugplatzes Johannisthal	1,435	1910-10	service suspended	last horse tram in Berlin
1912-03-09	Schmöckwitz-Grünauer Uferbahn	1,435	1924-08	Berliner Verkehrs-GmbH	electrification finished on 1912-07-23
1913-05-29	Straßenbahn der Gemeinde Heiligensee an der Havel	1,435	1920-10-01	Berliner Straßenbahn	
1920-10-01	Berliner Straßenbahn	1,000/1,435	1923-09-10	BSBG	meter gauge routes are of former TKb
1923-01-08	Kleinbahn Spandau-West – Hennigsdorf	1,435	1929-01-01	BVG	electrification later by BVG
1923-09-10	Berliner Straßenbahn-Betriebs-GmbH (BSBG)	1,000/1,435	1929-01-01	BVG	meter gauge routes are of former TKb
1924-08	Berliner Verkehrs-GmbH	1,435	1925-03-01	BSBG	

On the day of its formation, the BVG had 89 tram lines: a network of 634 km (394 mi) in length, over 4,000 tramway cars, and more than 14,400 employees. An average tram car ran over 42,500 km (26,400 mi) per year. The Berlin tram system had more than 929 million passengers in 1929, at which point, the BVG already had increased its service to 93 tram lines.

In the early 1930s, the Berlin tram network began to decline; after partial closing of the world's first electric tram in 1930, on 31 October 1934, Germany's oldest tram line followed. The Straße des 17. Juni, formerly the Charlottenburger Chaussee, was rebuilt by Nazi planners following a monumental east–west-Axis, and the tramway had to leave. In 1938, however, there were still 71 tram lines, 2,800 tram cars and about 12,500 employees. Consequently, the bus network was extended during this time. From 1933, Berlin also had trolley buses.

During World War II, some transport tasks were given back to the tramway to save oil. Thus an extensive transport of goods was established. Bombings (from March 1943 on) and the lack of personnel and electricity caused the transportation performance to decline. Due to the final Battle for Berlin, the tram system finally collapsed on 23 April 1945. Prior to the battle, many destroyed and gutted trams were turned into makeshift roadblocks (being pushed by civilians/Volkssturm militia) into the middle of streets and mostly filled with piles of building rubble to serve as solid obstacles) through major roads in the city to halt the advance of Soviet tanks and vehicles invading Berlin.

=== The network since 1945 ===
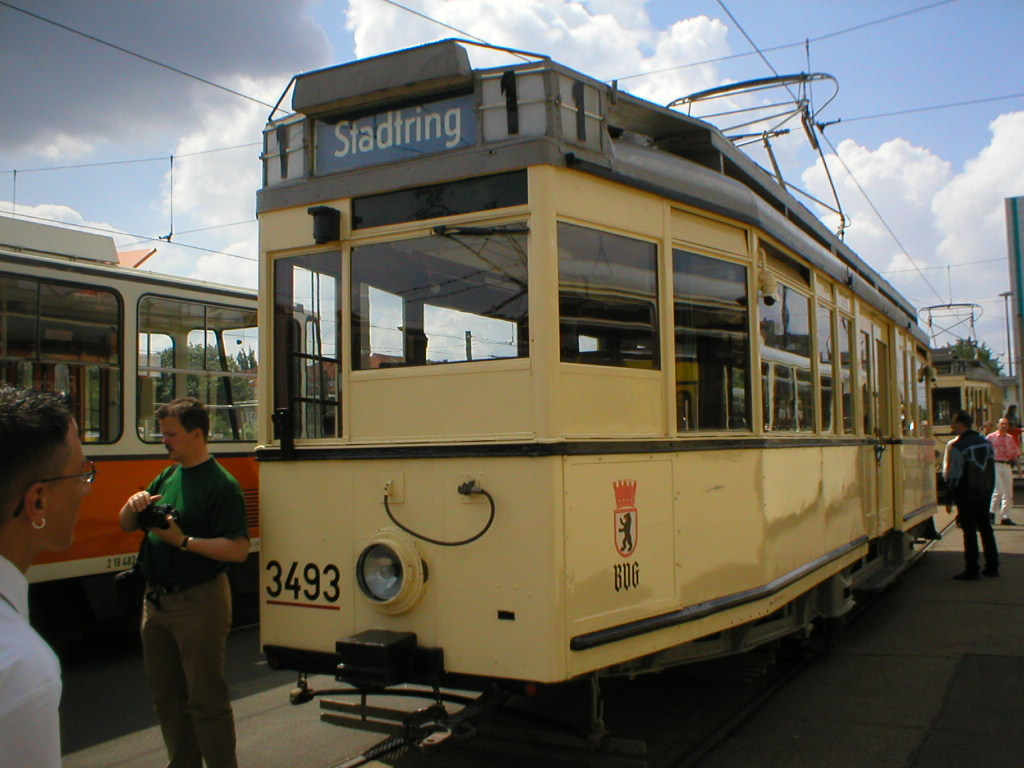
BVG class TM36, built in 1927, sometimes ran out of control, due to its innovative controlling system

The BVG was—like most other Berlin institutions—split into two different companies on 1 August 1949. Two separate companies were formed, the BVG West in the three western sections (with 36 tram lines) and the BVG Ost (Berlin Public Transit Authority East) (with 13 lines) in the Soviet sector. The latter became in 1969 the VEB Kombinat Berliner Verkehrsbetriebe (BVB). On 14 October 1950, traffic on the lines from West Berlin to the Brandenburgian suburbs Kleinmachnow and Schönefeld ceased; on 15 January 1953, traffic over the downtown sector border followed.

From 1949 to 1955, line by line, both companies replaced the Thomson-Houston type trolley poles of their tramcars with pantographs.

==== West ====
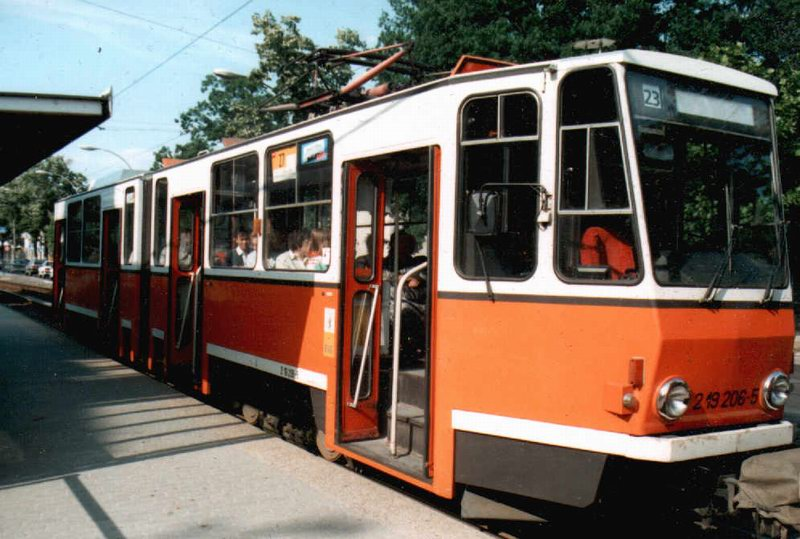
Articulated Tatra KT4D tramcar of the BVB, built 1980

From 1954 onwards, a shift took place with the public transit plans for West Berlin. From that moment, planning aimed at discontinuing the tram service and replacing it with extended underground and bus lines. The tramway system was considered old-fashioned and unnecessary since Berlin already had a well-developed underground network. From 1954 to 1962 numerous tram lines were replaced with bus routes and extended underground lines and stops. By 1962, the western part of the city had only 18 tram lines left out of the original 36.

On 2 October 1967 the final tramcar traveled through West Berlin over the last line, numbered 55—from Zoo Station via Ernst-Reuter-Square, the City Hall in Charlottenburg, Jungfernheide S-Bahn station, Siemensdamm, Nonnendammallee, Falkenseer Platz, and Neuendorfer Allee to Spandau, Hakenfelde.

Today, many MetroBus lines follow the routes of former tram lines.

The division of the city resulted in many problems and difficulties for the public transportation system. Tram lines could no longer operate through the city center, and the main tram depot was moved to Uferstraße in Western Berlin.

List of West Berlin trams from 1949 to 1967
Line	Stretch	Withdrawn	Replaced by	Current lines (2014)
2	Bernauer Straße, Sektorengrenze – Schöneberg, Gotenstraße Ecke Torgauer Straße	1964-06-01	A84, A90	245, M10***
3*	U Fehrbelliner Platz – Grüntaler Straße Ecke Osloer Straße	1964-08-01	A89	U7, M13***, 104, 106
6	Charlottenburg, Richard-Wagner-Platz – Neukölln, Elsenstraße /Ecke Heidelberger Straße	1961-07-01	A73	M46
15	Marienfelde, Daimlerstraße – Neukölln, Schulenburgpark	1966-07-01	A77	246, 277
21	Straßenbahnhof Moabit, Wiebestraße – Kreuzberg, Friesenstraße	1953-01-22	A24	TXL, M41, 248
23*	Moabit, Zwinglistraße – Wollankstraße, Sektorengrenze	1960-05-02	A70	M27
24*	Bernauer Straße, Sektorengrenze – Wollankstraße, Sektorengrenze	1960-05-02	no replacement	no replacement
25	Schöneberg, Gotenstraße – Bernauer Straße, Sektorengrenze	1961-09-01	U9, A64	U9, 106, 247
26	Spreewaldplatz – Tempelhof, Industriestraße	1963-09-29	no replacement	U7, M29, 277
27	Spreewaldplatz – Buckow, Alt-Buckow	1964-10-01	A91	M44, 344
28	Bahnhof Gesundbrunnen, Rügener Straße – Tegelort, Almazeile	1958-06-01	U6, verl. A20	U6, 222
29	Bahnhof Gesundbrunnen, Rügener Straße – Alt-Heiligensee	1958-06-01	U6, verl. A14	U6, 124
35**	Gartenfeld – Kopenhagener Straße, Sektorengrenze	1960-10-01	A72	U7, X33, M27, 327
36**	Kopenhagener Straße, Sektorengrenze – Bahnhof Gesundbrunnen, Rügener Straße	1960-05-02	A71	327
40	Dahlem, Clayallee – Steglitz, Birkbuschstraße	1959-10-01	A68	X83, 186
41	Bernauer Straße, Sektorengrenze – Alt-Tegel	1958-06-01	A61	U6, U8, 122
44	Invalidenstraße Ecke Heidestraße – Steglitz, Birkbuschstraße	1963-05-02	A86	U7, 186, 245
47	Britz, Gradestraße – Rudow, Stadtgrenze	1966-10-01	A41	171
51	Bahnhof Zoologischer Garten – Roseneck	1957-05-01	A60	249
53	Charlottenburg, Richard-Wagner-Platz – Spandau, Hakenfelde	1967-05-02	A56	136, M45
54	Charlottenburg, Richard-Wagner-Platz – Spandau, Johannesstift	1967-05-02	A54, AS1	M45
55	Bahnhof Zoologischer Garten – Spandau, Hakenfelde (via Siemensstadt)	1967-10-02	A55	U7, 136, 139
57	Wilmersdorf, Emser Platz – Grunewald, Roseneck	1954-11-01	A50	115
60	Schöneberg, Lindenhof – Charlottenburg, Königin-Elisabeth-Straße	1962-05-02	A74	U7, 309, 106
66	Schöneberg, Wartburgplatz – Steglitz, Thorwaldsenstraße	1963-05-02	A83	187
68	Bahnhof Wedding, Nettelbeckplatz – Bahnhof Wittenau (Nordbahn)	1958-06-01	A62	M21, X21
73*	Potsdamer Platz, Sektorengrenze – Bahnhof Lichterfelde Ost	1962-05-02	A48, verl. A53	M48, M85, M11
74*	Potsdamer Platz, Sektorengrenze – Lichterfelde, Finckensteinallee	1963-05-02	A83, A84	M48, M85, 184
75	Bahnhof Zoologischer Garten – Spandau, Hakenfelde (via Kantstraße)	1966-01-24	A94, A97	X34, X49, 136, M49
76 (I)	Grunewald, Roseneck – Anhalter Bahnhof	1954-07-01	A19	M19
76 (II)	Bahnhof Zoologischer Garten – Spandau, Johannisstift (ab 1959)	1966-01-24	A94, A97	X34, X49, M45, M49
77	Bahnhof Zoologischer Garten – Lichterfelde, Goerzallee	1963-05-02	A85	U9, M85, 188, 285, M46
78	Bahnhof Zoologischer Garten – Lichterfelde Süd, Lindenstraße	1963-05-02	A85	U9, M85, 188, 285, M46
79	Grunewald, Hagenplatz – U Nollendorfplatz	1954-07-01	A29	M29
88	Kreuzberg, Wiener Brücke – Steglitz, Stadtpark	1961-03-01	A75	M29, M48/M85, 246, 181
94	Oranienplatz – Neukölln, Schulenburgplatz	1959-10-01	A67	M41
95*	Sonnenallee Ecke Schwarzer Weg – Mehringplatz	1965-05-02	A95	M41
96*	U Mehringdamm – Lichterfelde, Goerzallee Ecke Darser Straße	1966-05-02	A96	117, 184, 248
98	U Tempelhof – Marienfelde, Daimlerstraße	1961-10-01	A77	U6, 277
99	U Tempelhof – Bahnhof Lichtenrade	1961-10-01	A76	U6, M76, X76
* former BVG-West/BVG-Ost before 1953-01-15
** former BVG-West/BVG-Ost before 1953-01-15 (but only belongs to BVG-West)
*** after reunification it was reopened
Some of the former routes are no longer usable.

==== East ====
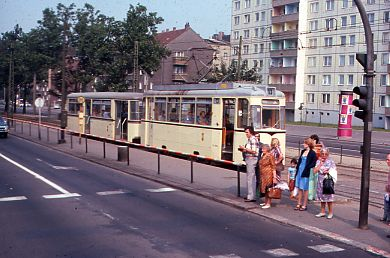
Tram in East Berlin, 1977

Soviet Moscow, with its tram-free avenues, was the role model for East Berlin's transport planning. The car-oriented mentality of West Berlin also spread in the East, with many tram lines also closing in the latter in the 1950s and 1960s. In 1967, the lines through the city center closed down at the same time as the new city expansion around Alexanderplatz was starting to develop.

However, a complete elimination of the city's tram network was neither planned nor even discussed.

The following streets were constructed in order to connect the new housing estates Marzahn, Hohenschönhausen, and finally Hellersdorf to the city's tram network from the late 1970s to the early 1990s:

Date	Streets
1951-08-02	Ehrlichstraße, Blockdammweg
1951-08-02	Buschallee (zw. Kniprodeallee [heute Hansastraße] und Suermondtstraße), Suermondtstraße
1951-08-02	Markgrafendamm, Hauptstraße (zw. Markgrafendamm und Karlshorster Straße)
1953-02-15	Groß-Berliner Damm
1953-06-13	Falkenberger Straße (heute Gehrenseestraße, Gartenstadt Hohenschönhausen)
1954-05-17	Friedenstraße, Friedrichsberger Straße, Lebuser Straße
1962-01-28	S-Bahnhof Adlershof (Westseite)
1965-12-14	Langhansstraße (zw. Gustav-Adolf-Straße und Prenzlauer Promenade)
1966-05-18	Stralauer Platz
1966-08-01	Holzmarktstraße (zw. Krautstraße und Andreasstraße)
1966-09-16	Stahlheimer Straße (zw. Wichertstraße und Wisbyer Straße)
1966-12-12	Mollstraße (zw. Leninplatz [heute Platz der Vereinten Nationen] und Hans-Beimler-Straße [heute Otto-Braun-Straße])
1967-01-02	Mollstraße (zw. Hans-Beimler-Straße [heute Otto-Braun-Straße] und Prenzlauer Allee)
1971-11-14	Bleicheroder Straße, Stiftweg
1975-11-02	Herzbergstraße (ab Siegfriedstraße), Allee der Kosmonauten (bis Rhinstraße), Rhinstraße (zw. Allee der Kosmonauten und Straße der Befreiung [heute Alt-Friedrichsfelde])
1979-04-06	Allee der Kosmonauten (zw. Rhinstraße und Schleife Elisabethstraße)
1980-03-17	Altenhofer Straße, Leninallee (heute Landsberger Allee), S-Bahnhof Marzahn
1982-10-06	Marzahner Promenade, Bruno-Leuschner-Straße (heute Raoul-Wallenberg-Straße), Allee der Kosmonauten (zw. Leninallee [heute Landsberger Straße] und Schleife Elisabethstraße), Trasse Lea-Grundig-Straße/Max-Hermannstraße/Trusetaler Straße (bis Schleife Henneckestraße)
1984-12-21	Wartenberger Straße, Rüdickenstraße, Zingster Straße
1985-04-01	Rhinstraße (zw. Hauptstraße und Allee der Kosmonauten)
1985-04-01	Leninallee (heute Landsberger Alle, zw. Allee der Kosmonauten und Betriebshof Marzahn)
1986-10-06	Schleife Henneckestraße bis Schleife Ahrensfelde
1987-08-10	Kniprodeallee, Falkenberger Chaussee (bis Prerower Platz)
1988-08-20	Falkenberger Chaussee (zw. Prerower Platz und Schleife Falkenberg)

Some streets were closed, especially those too close to the Berlin Wall:

Date	Streets
1950-10-14	Waltersdorfer Chaussee, Mittelstraße (Schönefeld)
1951-03-19	Königstraße, Spandauer Straße (zw. Königstraße und Molkenmarkt), Schloßplatz, Werderstraße, Französische Straße (bis Charlottenstraße, Lindentunnel, Oberwallstraße, Jerusalemer Straße)
1952-01-02	Elsenstraße (zw. Plesser Straße und Heidelberger Straße)
1952-03-03	Stalinallee (zw. Andreasstraße und Jacobystraße)
1952-06-16	Charlottenstraße (zw. Unter den Linden und Clara-Zetkin-Straße)
1953-01-16	Ebertstraße (zw. Potsdamer Platz und Clara-Zetkin-Straße)
1953-01-16	Breite Straße (Mitte)
1953-01-16	Wollankstraße (zw. Sektorengrenze und Breite Straße (Pankow))
1953-01-16	Kopenhagener Straße, Hauptstraße (zw. Sektorengrenze und Wilhelmsruh (Pankow))
1953-01-16	Bornholmer Straße (zw. Sektorengrenze und Björnsonstraße)
1953-03-27	Rosenfelder Straße, Irenenstraße, Weitlingstraße, Lückstraße, Nöldnerstraße, Stadthausstraße, Türrschmidtstraße
1956-01-11	Kommandantenstraße, Beuthstraße
1957-06-25	Bulgarische Straße (bis Alt-Treptow)
1959-06-05	Groß-Berliner Damm
1959-08-30	Alt-Stralau, Tunnelstraße
1959-11-13	Bulgarische Straße (zw. Alt-Treptow und Köpenicker Landstraße)
1960-08-01	Puschkinallee, Am Treptower Park (zw. Puschkinallee und Elsenstraße)
1961-08-13	Clara-Zetkin-Straße (zw. Ebertstraße und Planckstraße), Ebertstraße (zw. Brandenburger Tor und Reichstagufer)
1961-08-13	Oberbaumbrücke
1961-08-23	Heinrich-Heine-Straße (zw. Dresdner Straße und Schmidstraße)
1961-09-19	Köpenicker Straße (zw. Schillingbrücke und Brückenstraße)
1962-01-28	Adlergestell (zw. Dörpfeldstraße und Köpenicker Straße)
1962-08-03	Elisabethstraße, Karl-Marx-Allee (zw. Elisabethstraße und Leninallee)
1965-01-07	Hannoversche Straße
1965-12-14	Gustav-Adolf-Straße (zw. Langhansstraße und Prenzlauer Promenade)
1966-04-01	Idastraße, Wackenbergstraße, Buchholzer Straße, Blankenburger Straße
1966-05-18	Fruchtstraße (zw. Mühlendamm und Am Ostbahnhof)
1966-07-04	Breslauer Straße (zw. Andreasstraße und Krautstraße)
1966-08-25	Heinrich-Heine-Straße (zw. Schmidstraße und Köpenicker Straße)
1966-09-16	Krügerstraße, Wichertstraße (zw. Stahlheimer Straße und Gudvanger Straße), Gudvanger Straße (zw. Wichertstraße und Krügerstraße)
1966-10-10	Jacobystraße, Kleine Frankfurter Straße, Leninallee (zw. Alexanderplatz und Leninplatz)
1966-10-10	Am Ostbahnhof (zw. Fruchtstraße und Andreasstraße)
1966-10-20	Charlottenstraße, Taubenstraße (Wendeschleife)
1966-12-19	Prenzlauer Straße, Hans-Beimler-Straße (zw. Alexanderplatz und Mollstraße), Weinmeisterstraße, Jüdenstraße (Wendeschleife)
1967-01-20	Münzstraße, Memhardstraße, Alexanderplatz, Alexanderstraße (zw. Alexanderplatz und Wallnerstraße)
1967-12-12	Stralauer Allee, Markgrafendamm
1968-10-19	Wallnerstraße, Raupachstraße (Wendeschleife), Alexanderstraße (zw. Wallnerstraße und Holzmarktstraße)
1969-07-01	Dönhoffplatz (Wendeschleife)
1969-07-01	Stralauer Platz, Mühlenstraße, Warschauer Straße (zw. Mühlenstraße und Helsingforser Platz)
1969-10-13	Karlshorster Straße, Stubenrauchbrücke
1970-08-24	Leipziger Straße, Spittelmarkt, Wallstraße, Inselstraße, Köpenicker Straße (zw. Inselstraße und Brückenstraße), Brückenstraße, Jannowitzbrücke, Holzmarktstraße, Andreasstraße, Lebuser Straße, Friedrichsberger Straße, Friedenstraße
1971-04-01	Baumschulenstraße, Hasselwerderstraße, Schnellerstraße (zw. Hasselwerderstraße und Bruno-Bürgel-Weg), Bruno-Bürgel-Weg
1971-11-08	Damerowstraße
1973-07-14	Wiener Brücke (Wendeschleife), Karl-Kunger-Straße, Plesser Straße, Elsenstraße, Am Treptower Park (zw. Elsenstraße und Bulgarische Straße), Köpenicker Landstraße, Schnellerstraße (zw. Köpenicker Landstraße und Brückenstraße), Wendeschleife S-Bahnhof Schöneweide
1975-11-01	Straße der Befreiung
1983-03-01	Falkenberger Straße, Arnimstraße

=== After reunification ===
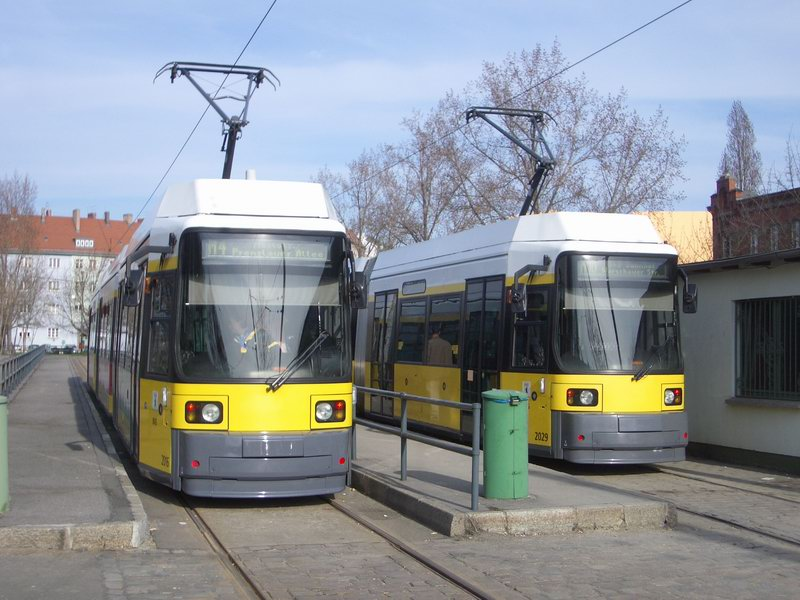
Double-end "GT6N-ZR.2" trams in BVG yellow

In 1992, the West Berlin transport company BVG took over East Berlin's BVB. (In addition to bus and U-Bahn lines, the new BVG also ran the trams, by now only operating in the former East Berlin districts).

There was an attempt to shut down the tram routes running to Pankow, because the trams in Schönhauser Allee run parallel to the U2 line, though the latter does not run to Rosenthal. However, in line with other tram networks expanding at that time, plans for network expansions were soon made - some of those across the now-abolished border into West-Berlin.

In 1995, the first stretch of the tram route along Bornholmer Straße was opened to the west in two stages. The Rudolf-Virchow-Klinikum and the metro stations located in Seestraße, Wedding, and Osloer Straße in Gesundbrunnen have since re-connected to the tram network.

Since 1997, the tram has stopped right at Friedrichstraße station. Previously, passengers changing between modes of transport here had to take a long walk to get to the restored train station. Since then, trams have terminated along the reversing loop "Am Kupfergraben" near Humboldt University and Museum Island.

The following year saw the re-opening of tram facilities at Alexanderplatz. These routes now arrive directly from the intersection with Otto-Braun-Straße across the square, stopping both at the U2 underground station and the overground station for regional and commuter trains, where there is a direct interchange to the U5 and U8 lines. An increase in tram accidents in pedestrian zones was feared by critics but did not materialize.

In 2000, the tram tracks were extended from the previous terminus at Revalerstraße, past the Warschauer Straße S-Bahn station to the U-Bahn station of the same name. Since there is no room for a return loop, a blunt ending track was built. In order to accomplish this, bi-directional vehicles were procured. However, the tracks, which were further extended in 1995 to the Oberbaumbrücke, have not yet been expanded to Hermannplatz, as had been planned.

Since 2000, the tram in Pankow has run beyond the previous terminus Pankow Kirche on to Guyotstraße, connecting the local development areas to the network.

On 12 December 2004, BVG introduced the BVG 2005 plus transport concept. The main focus was the introduction of Metrotram or Metrobus lines on very busy routes which have no U-Bahn or S-Bahn lines. On the tram network, therefore, nine MetroTram lines were introduced and the remaining lines were partially rearranged. The numbering scheme is based on that from 1993, but has undergone minor adjustments. MetroTram and MetroBus lines have an "M" in front of the line number.

Single MetroTram/MetroBus lines operate on the main radial network. As a rule, the line number corresponds to that of 1993: the M4 from lines 2, 3, and 4, the M5 from line 5, and so on. In addition, the two Pankow lines 52 and 53 were included as line M1 in the scheme. The supplementary lines of these radials continue to be numbered from 10 to 19, unless they augment the respective metro service. Metro services of the ring and tangential net received a number in the range 10–19; the supplementary lines retained a number in the range of 20–29. An exception is the subsequently established line 37, which, together with lines M17 and 27, travels a common route. Of the lines numbered 50–59 the only one remaining was the 50; the lines numbered 60–69 remained largely unaffected by the measures. The then-new lines operated as follows:

- M1: Niederschönhausen, Schillerstraße and Rosenthal to Mitte, Am Kupfergraben (replacing 52 and 53)
- M2: Heinersdorf to Hackescher Markt
- M4: Hohenschönhausen, Zingster Straße to Hackescher Markt
- M5: Hohenschönhausen, Zingster Straße to Hackescher Markt
- M6: Hellersdorf, Riesaer Straße to Schwartzkopffstraße
- M8: Ahrensfelde to Schwartzkopffstraße
- M10: Prenzlauer Berg, Eberswalder Straße to Warschauer Straße (replacing 20)
- M13: Wedding, Virchow Klinikum to Warschauer Straße (replacing 23)
- M17: Falkenberg to Schöneweide

Termini in italics above have been subject to change, further information about the current termini is given below.

In 2006, a second line was opened in the western part of the city, and the M10 line was extended beyond its former terminus Eberswalderstraße along Bernauer Straße in Gesundbrunnen to Berlin Nordbahnhof in the district of Mitte, before being further extended to Berlin Hauptbahnhof in 2015.

In May 2007, a new line from Prenzlauer Tor along Karl-Liebknecht-Straße towards Alexanderplatz was put into operation, where the line M2 leads directly to the urban and regional train station instead of the current service via Rosa-Luxemburg-Platz to Hackescher Markt. The previous route along Alt and Neu Schönhauser Straße no longer carries regular services but operates only as a feeder line.

On 4 September 2011, a one-and-a-half-kilometer-long new line from the Adlershof S-Bahn station was opened. It runs from the Adlershof science and business hub (WISTA) to the provisional terminus provisional terminus Karl-Ziegler-Straße at the Adlershof campus of the Humboldt University of Berlin. The route, with three newly built stops, cost 13 million euros and was first serviced by lines 60 and 61 at overlapping 10-minute intervals. Since 13 December 2015, line 63 has run to Karl Ziegler Street, replacing line 60. The connection was originally planned for completion in 1999. However, the plan approval procedure was only completed in 2002. Shortly before the plan approval decision expired after five years, the project was approved on 9 August 2007, and soon after the first masts for the overhead line were set up. It was expected to carry 9,000 passengers per workday. On 31 October 2021, it was again extended from Karl-Ziegler Straße, via Landschaftspark Johannisthal to Schöneweide via the Groß-Berliner Damm.

There are also some minor closures:

Closures from 1990
Date	Streets
1993-01-01	S-Bahnhof Adlershof/Köpenicker Straße, Köpenicker Straße, Grünauer Straße, Am Falkenberg
1993-05-23	Hauptstraße (before Karlshorster Straße)
1997-12-20	Am Weidendamm (between Friedrichstraße and Planckstraße), Planckstraße (between Am Weidendamm and Georgenstraße)
2000-09-29	Französisch Buchholz: (Parkstraße, Elfenallee, Gravensteinstraße (reversing loop), Grünstraße)
2007-05-30	Alte Schönhauser Straße, Neue Schönhauser Straße (still exists as operational route)
2013-08-26	Chausseestraße (between Invalidenstraße and Wöhlertstraße), Schwartzkopffstraße, Pflugstraße, Wöhlertstraße

=== Towards the Hauptbahnhof ===
At the timetable change on 14 December 2014, a new tram line was opened from Naturkundemuseum to Hauptbahnhof via Invalidenstraße, with the final stop at Lüneburger Straße in the district of Alt-Moabit. The double-track line is 2.3 kilometers long to the main station, and new stops have been built on the Chausseestraße, the Invalidenpark and the Hauptbahnhof. This is followed by the 1.1 km single track block bypass that has three stops at Lesser-Ury-Weg, Lueneburger Straße and Clara Jaschke-Straße, as well as the installation area. The planned opening date has already been postponed several times. Originally planned to complete in 2002. However, the plan was caught by the Administrative Court in 2004 and revised to either 2006 and 2007. However, the first 80 metres of the track has already been built during the construction of Berlin Hauptbahnhof.

A new approval procedure was completed on 15 January 2010. In April 2011, the preparatory construction work had begun. The Ministry of Transport revised the 50 metres of the length, a two-meter-wide strip of garden to the state of Berlin to provide enough space for all road users. In the course of the work on the new line sector, the line branch along, Chausseestraße (between Invalidenstraße and Wöhlertstraße), Schwartzkopffstraße, Pflugstraße, Wöhlertstraße was permanently closed on 26 August 2013. The commissioning of the new line was initially only with the line M5. With the restoration of the connection from the Nordbahnhof to the underground station Naturkundemuseum, the new line from 28 August 2015 could also be used by the lines M8 and M10.

=== Increasing the supply voltage ===
In 2023 work on increasing the supply voltage from 600 V to 750 V was completed.

== Lines ==
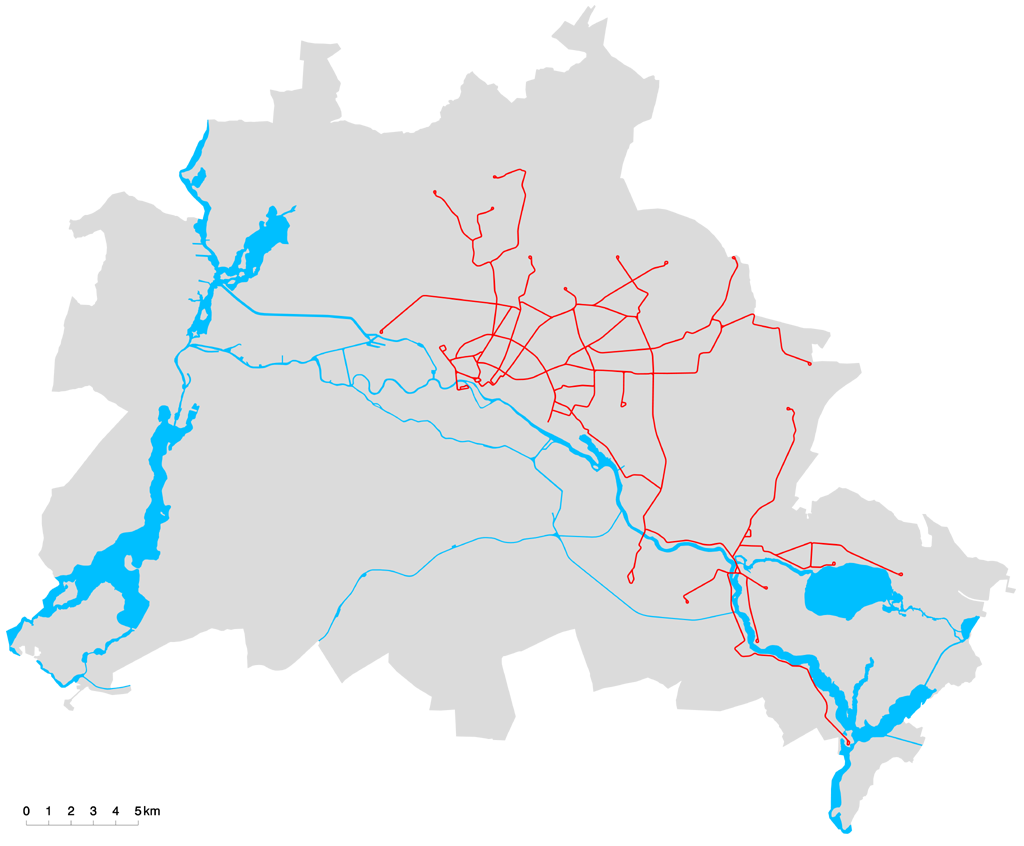
Map as of 2009

The first horse-drawn tramlines did not use any special labeling as they were radially inferior from the respective endpoints in the center and thus had few points of contact with other lines. Only with the expansion of the network into the city center was there a need to distinguish the lines from each other. From the 1880s, most major German cities therefore used colored target signs or signal boards, sometimes both together. In Berlin, these were always kept in the same combination. As identification colors red, yellow, green and white were used, from 1898 additionally blue. The panels were one or two colors, the latter either half / half divided or in thirds with a line in the second color. However, the number of signal panels used was not sufficient to equip each line with its own color code. In addition, crossing or side by side lines should run with different signal panels. This meant that individual lines had to change their color code several times in the course of their existence. As a result of the electrification and the takeover of the New Berlin Horse Ride by the Great Berlin Horse Railways / Great Berlin Tram (GBPfE / GBS) increased their number of lines at the turn of the century abruptly. With a view of the Hamburg tram, where in the summer of 1900 for the first time in German-speaking countries line numbers were introduced, experimented the GBS from 1901 also with the numbers. In the timetables of this time, the lines were numbered, but could change their order every year. The numbering scheme should include not only the GBS but also its secondary lines. At the same time, letter-number combinations as they appeared in the timetable booklet should be avoided.

The scheme introduced on 6 May 1902 was relatively simple: single numbers were reserved for the ring lines, two-digit for the remaining lines. Initially, the tens gave information about where the line was going; 10 lines were to be found in Moabit, 60 lines in Weissensee and 70 lines in Lichtenberg. The lines of the West Berlin suburban railway were assigned the letters A to M, the Berlin-Charlottenburg tram the letters N to Z and the lines of the Southern Berlin suburban railway were numbered with Roman numerals. The 1910 taken over by the GBS northeastern Berliner Vorortbahn received in 1913 the line designation NO. The colored signal panels remained in parallel until about 1904. In addition, the lines created during this period were still colored signal panels with new, sometimes even three-color color combinations.

Insertors were marked separately from the March 1903. They bore the letter E behind the line number of their main line. In later years, these lines increasingly took over the tasks of booster drives and were therefore shown in the timetables as separate lines. On 15 April 1912, the GBS introduced the first line with three-digit number. The 164 was created by extending the 64, which was maintained in parallel. In the following months more lines were provided with 100 numbers or newly set up, usually as a line pair to the existing line.

The surrounding businesses were not affected by the change in May 1902 and set on their own markings. The lines of the urban trams and the meterspurigen lines of the Teltower circular orbits were still marked with signal panels, on the other hand, the BESTAG and in Heiligensee, not the lines, but only the targets were marked with different colored signs. In 1908, the Spandauer Straßenbahn introduced the line identification with letters, which corresponded to the initial letter of the destination (line P to Pichelsdorf, etc.), in 1917 the company switched to numbers. In Cöpenick, the lines were marked from 1906 with numbers, from 1910 additionally with colored signal panels for the individual routes (red lines to Friedrichshagen, etc.). The Berlin Ostbahnen used from 1913 also like the SBV Roman numbers as line numbers. The other companies, including the standard-gauge lines of the Teltower Kreisbahnen, did not use a line marking.

With the merger of companies for the Berlin tram, the GBS's numbering scheme was extended to cover the rest of the network. Usually, those numbers are assigned, whose lines were continued during the World War I. For example, it came about that the lines operating in Köpenick received mainly 80s numbers. Letters were still awarded to the tram lines in the BVG until 1924, after which it was reserved for the suburban tariff buses.

With the outbreak of the Second World War, the Berlin public transport companies had to stop a large part of the bus traffic to save fuel. Tram traffic has been extended accordingly. The newly established amplifier lines contributed to the distinction of the master lines 200 and 300 numbers. From 1941, the night routes of the bus and the tram networks were later classified into the 400-series numbers. The measures existed until the end of the war. The last 100 numbers were renumbered on 31 May 1949.

After the administrative separation of the BVG initially only changed the numbering scheme. Tram lines running from the east to the west of Berlin kept their number after the grid separation in 1953 and as a result of network thinning, individual lines were disappeared. The BVG-West waived from July 1966, the prefix A on the bus lines, the BVG-Ost waived on 1 January 1968. While in the west tram traffic was stopped 15 months later, the passenger in the east could not tell from the line number whether it was a tram or bus line. The Berliner Verkehrsbetriebe therefore planned to systematise their network in the 1970s. The city center lines of the tram should receive the line numbers 1 to 30, in Köpenick should retain their 80s numbers. The remaining numbers were intended for the bus. Night lines received from 1973 uniformly 100 numbers, for the tram were initially provided only the numbers from 120. The conversion of the daily lines was only partially completed.

After the reunification, in two steps, a uniform numbering scheme was introduced, which included the lines in the state of Brandenburg. The Berlin tram was assigned the line number range from 1 to 86, then followed by the overland operations in Woltersdorf, Schöneiche and Strausberg with the numbers 87 to 89. The Potsdam tram received the 90s line numbers. E-lines were no longer listed separately in the timetable, but the amplifiers continued to operate as such until 2004. Night lines were indicated on both means of transport by a preceding N and the three-digit line numbers were henceforth intended for the bus routes. The first conversion of 2 June 1991 followed the Berlin tram lines on 23 May 1993. The network was reorganized and divided into five number ranges. The main focus was on the focus on the historical center. Single lines formed the radial main network, 10 lines their supplementary network. 20er lines were intended for the ring and Tangentiallinien. There were 50 lines in the district of Pankow, 60 lines in the district of Köpenick analogous to the bus lines there.

BVG had instituted a new line structure, where the BVG has 22 lines since 2004. MetroTram also uses the symbol. On 12 December 2004, BVG had introduced the transport concept, BVG 2005+. The main content was the introduction of metro lines on busy routes where there are no S-Bahn or U-Bahn. In the tram network, therefore, nine tram lines under MetroTram were introduced, and the other lines have permanently rearranged. The numbering scheme is that it was similar to the 1993 scheme, but has undergone major adjustments.

Metro lines with a single digit number travel through the radial main network, as a rule, the line number corresponds to that of 1993, so the lines became 2, 3, and 4 into M4, the 5 into M5 and so on. In addition, the two Pankow lines, 52 and 53 were included as line M1 in the main scheme. The supplementary lines of the radials continue to carry 10 numbers, unless they have been merged into the amplifier of the metro line. Metro lines of the ring and tangential network received the numbers in the 10 range, whose supplementary lines retain the 20 range. An example is the retrofitted line, route 37, which together with the lines of M17 and 27 runs a common route. Of the 50 routes remained, the only one of the 50, the 60 lines were remained untouched by these measures.

M1	Mitte, Am Kupfergraben – Niederschönhausen, Schillerstraße / Rosenthal Nord
M2	S+U Alexanderplatz/Dircksenstraße – Am Steinberg (- Heinersdorf)
M4	S Hackescher Markt – Hohenschönhausen, Zingster Straße / Falkenberg
M5	(S+U Hauptbahnhof -) S Hackescher Markt – Hohenschönhausen, Zingster Straße
M6	(S Hackescher Markt -) Landsberger Allee/Petersburger Straße – Hellersdorf, Riesaer Straße
M8	(S+U Hauptbahnhof -) Landsberger Allee/Petersburger Straße – Ahrensfelde/Stadtgrenze
M10	U Turmstraße – S+U Warschauer Straße
M13	Wedding, Virchow-Klinikum – S Warschauer Straße
M17	(Falkenberg -) Hohenschönhausen, Gehrenseestraße – S Adlershof
12	Mitte, Am Kupfergraben – Weißensee, Pasedagplatz
16	S+U Frankfurter Allee – Ahrensfelde/Stadtgrenze
18	S Springpfuhl – Hellersdorf, Riesaer Straße
21	S+U Lichtenberg/Gudrunstraße – S Schöneweide (via Eldenaer Straße, Frankfurter Tor, Boxhagener Straße)
27	Krankenhaus Köpenick – Weißensee, Pasedagplatz
37	S+U Lichtenberg/Gudrunstraße – S Schöneweide (via Rhinstraße, Treskowallee)
50	(Wedding, Virchow-Klinikum -) Prenzlauer Berg, Björnsonstraße – Französisch Buchholz, Guyotstraße
60	Johannisthal, Haeckelstraße – Friedrichshagen, Altes Wasserwerk
61	(S Schöneweide) – S Adlershof – Rahnsdorf/Waldschänke
62	Wendenschloß – S Mahlsdorf
63	Adlershof, Landschaftspark Johannisthal – Mahlsdorf, Rahnsdorfer Straße
67	Krankenhaus Köpenick – S Schöneweide
68	S Köpenick – Alt-Schmöckwitz

Tram line 68 was named by the National Geographic Society as one of the ten great streetcar routes worldwide.

== Future plans ==
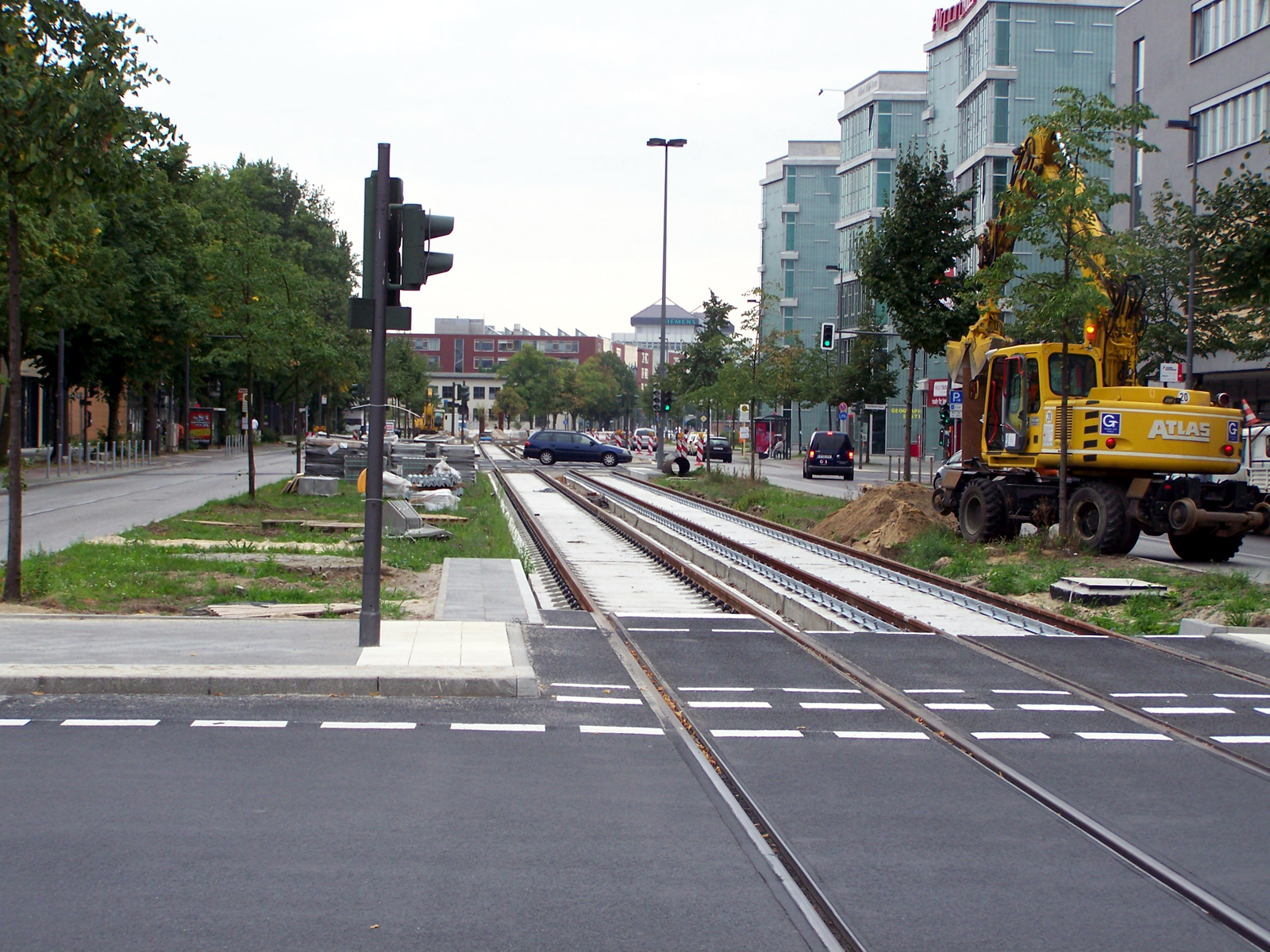
Tramway construction at Wista Adlershof

Since December 2016, Berlin has planned major light rail expansion which has been revived. Earlier plans has been there since 2000 for completion between 2005 and 2010. There will be no tramway closures.

Four tram projects already under development by BVG were being prioritised for construction with work beginning from 2017 to 2021, with only the first two of the four starting construction in said time span. The other two have had construction delayed for a later time.

- Berlin Hauptbahnhof – Turmstraße U-Bahn station
- Schöneweide – Wista Adlershof
- Rahnsdorfer Straße – Mahlsdorf S-Bahn station
- A planned extension to Ostkreuz from Lichtenberg

Five more tram lines will also be developed and construction will begin after 2021; these will see trams returning to parts of inner West Berlin for the first time since the 1960s, in addition to the already dense network expansion in the city. These include:

- Alexanderplatz – Kulturforum – Kleistpark – Rathaus Steglitz
- Turmstraße – Mierendorffplatz
- Warschauer Straße S-Bahn/U-Bahn station – Hermannplatz
- connection from Heinersdorf to the Blankenburger Pflasterweg development area, and
- Pankow – Heinersdorf – Weißensee.

These are the long-term plans after 2026, which will see more direct tram networks in the West Berlin area:

- S-Bahnhof Schöneweide – Sonnenallee – Hermannplatz – Potsdamer Platz (M9/M41)
- Potsdamer Platz – Wittenbergplatz/Zoologischer Garten
- Mierendorffplatz – Jungfernheide – Urban Tech Republic (Tegel Airport): to be designated as line M20
- Pankow – Wollankstraße – Turmstraße (M27) – Mierendorffplatz – Luisenplatz
- (Alexanderplatz –) Spittelmarkt – Lindenstraße – Hallesches Tor – Mehringdamm (it can be M2)
- Sterndamm – Johannisthaler Chaussee
- Lützowstraße – Zoologischer Garten
- Berlin Hauptbahnhof – Perleberger Straße
- Turmstraße – Rathaus Pankow

Further long-term plans after 2031:

- Rathaus Spandau – Hahneberg
- Falkenseer Platz – Freudstraße
- Rathaus Steglitz – Friedenfelser Straße
- Virchow-Klinikum – Ernst-Reuter-Platz – Zoologischer Garten
- Mahlsdorf – Riesaer Straße

In Johannisthal a route over the Sterndamm and the Stubenrauchstraße to the subway station at Zwickauer Damm in Rudow, or to the subway station at Johannisthaler Chaussee, has been proposed. This route serves the residential areas around the Zwickauer Damm and the Eisenhutweg, making for a better public transport connection. For this route, space was reserved for the tram tracks as a preliminary step in the construction of the Hermann-Gladenbeck Bridge over the A-113 and the Massantenbrücke over the Teltowkanal 2004. Likewise, the existing track bed of the Neukölln-Mittenwalder railway can be used behind the Massantenbrücke or Hermann-Gladenbeck bridge, which is just a short distance behind the underground station at Zwickauer Damm.

Until 2006, there were deliberations to suspend parts of lines M1, M2, 12, 27, 60, and 61 as soon as the parts of the road, then considered unprofitable, were to be renewed for further operation. However, these were not realized, in fact, some of the mentioned routes have now been refurbished, the headways have been consolidated on them, or, as already mentioned, there are even plans for extensions.

== Rolling stock ==
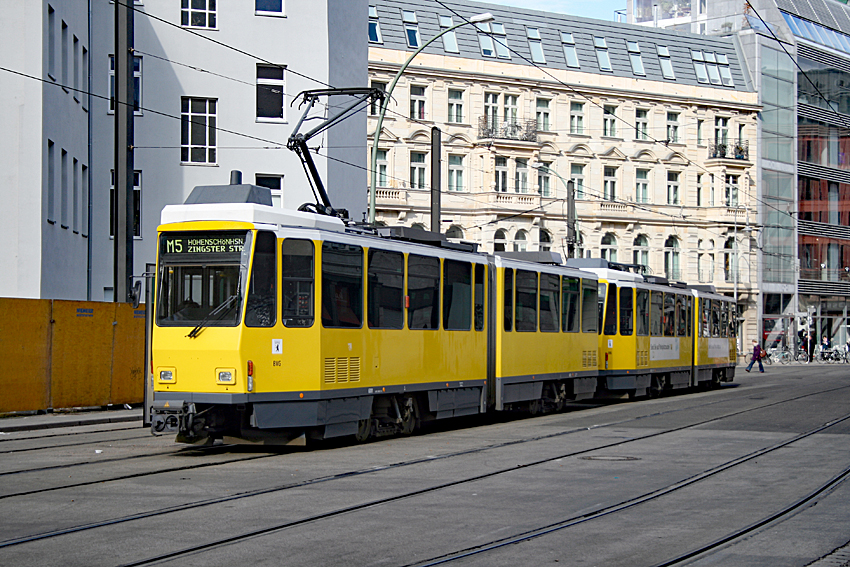
BVG Tatra KT4D trams in Große Präsidentenstraße

Berlin's tram system has two different families of vehicles. There are low floor six-axle double articulated GTU, GTO and GTZO (formerly GT6N and GT6N-ZR) trams in unidirectional and bidirectional versions, and since 2008, the Bombardier Flexity Berlin.

The Tatra KT4 trams were phased out by 2021, and the Communist-era T6A2/B6A2 trams were phased out by 2007.

The number of trams has shrunk continuously. The BVB had 1,024 vehicles, while currently there are about 600. The reduction is possible because the new low-floor cars on average achieve more than twice the mileage per year (100,000 km (62,137 mi)), and, being longer, carry more passengers and therefore rarely operate in multiple.

In July 2006, the cost of energy per vehicle-kilometer was:

- tram €0.33
- coupled set €0.45
- bus €0.42
- underground train €1.18

=== DÜWAG GT6N ===
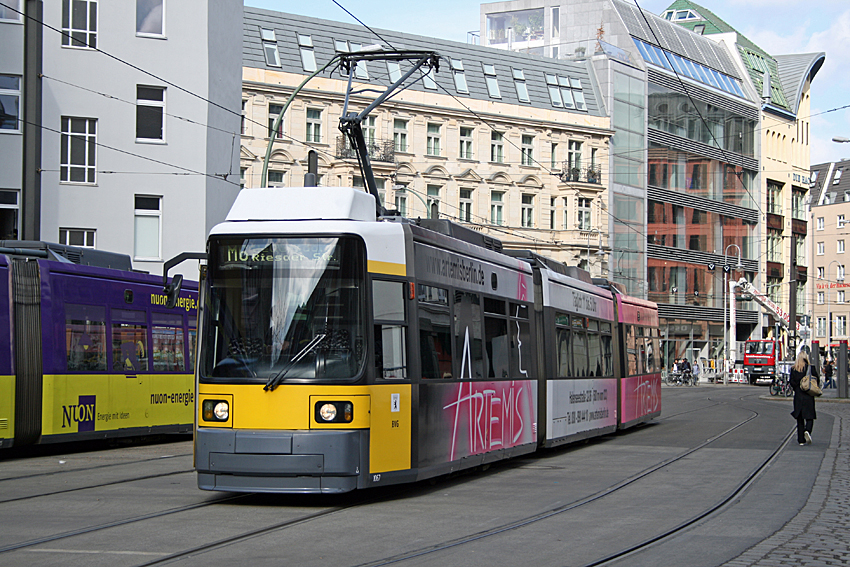
1067, Düwag GT6N in Große Präsidentenstraße

Between 1992 and 2003 45 bidirectional GT6N-ZRs and 105 unidirectional GT6Ns were purchased. The cars have a width of 2.30 m (7 ft 7 in) and a length of 26.80 m (87 ft 11 in). They can carry 150 passengers and can run as coupled sets.

134 cars were leased to a US investor and leased back. The SNB has accrued more than €157 million ($205 million) to hedge potential losses from cross-border business.

In the end of 2011 and beginning of 2012 the SNB began the upgrading of 1006 and 1016 as a sample exercise. They were provided with a new drive technology and new software such as the Flexitys. The only mutually detachable vehicles are distinguished by new car numbers 1506 and 1516. After completion of the first two the BVG ordered the upgrading of all other cars of the GT6N and GT6N-ZR cars.

Identically to 1506 and 1516 the first 77 cars were provided with a new drive technology and new software and upgraded to type GTU trains in the years 2012 – 2016. All GTU trains got increased car numbers by +500. The new car numbers are 1502 – 1605 (with gaps).

The rest of the GT6N and all of the GT6N-ZR got a new on-board-unit instead, upgrading them to type GTO and GTZO in the years 2016 – 2017. Their numbers were increased by +200. The new car numbers are 1201 – 1263 (with gaps) for the GTO and 2201 – 2245 for the GTZO.

=== Flexity Berlin ===
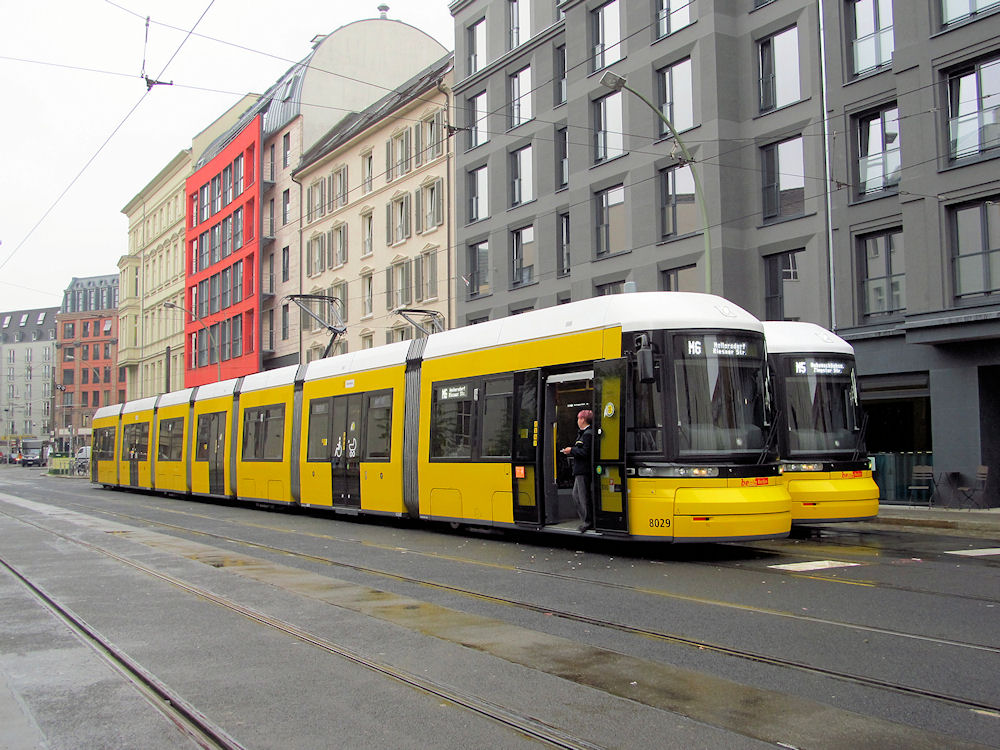
8029, Bombardier Flexity Berlin in Hackescher Markt

In April 2005, a European tender was issued for low floor trams, half unidirectional, and half bidirectional vehicles. The latter will respond better to the BVG and construction faults and build on certain routes for cost savings. The Vienna tramway tram type ULF was tested in passenger service.

On 12 June 2006, the BVG decided to procure new trams. These are based on the tested Incentro, referred to by Bombardier as Flexity Berlin. In October 2008, for €13 million ($17 million), four prototypes were ordered and since then extensively tested. There are one- and two-way cars, respectively 30.8 m (101 ft 1 in) and 40 m (131 ft 3 in) in length, carrying about 180 or 240 passengers. Use in coupled sets is not possible.

On 29 June 2009, the supervisory board of the BVG decided to buy 99 Flexity cars, 40 of which will be long and 59 short versions, for €305.3 million ($397.9 million). In September 2011 the first 13 long cars began to be delivered. To replace all old Tatra cars, a further 33 costing €92.3 million ($120.3 million) may need to be ordered in 2017. The trams will be manufactured at Bombardier's Bautzen works or Hennigsdorf.

In June 2012 the supervisory board approved the BVG 2nd Serial recall of an additional 39 trams of type "Flexity Berlin". Considering the order of over 99 vehicles from 2010, that means a total of 38 vehicles and 47 long bidirectional vehicles, as well as 53 short bidirectional vehicles will be ordered from the manufacturer, Bombardier Transportation. Thus, the SNB responds to both the very positive development of passenger numbers at the tram and allows bidirectional vehicles the eventual abandonment of turning loops and enhancing the design stops. Once this procurement is secured in 2017, then the old Tatra cars can be scrapped. The State of Berlin's funded budget is €439.1 million ($572.7 million).

The new cars have 2.4 m (7 ft 10 in) wheel spacing, 10 cm (3.9 in) longer than the existing low-floor trams. The track width was chosen so that modifications in the network are not necessary This affects only the routes upon which the Flexities will be operated. They are unable to run in Köpenick and on parts of the network in Pankow.

In December 2015, BVG exercised an option for another 47 Flexity trams from Bombardier to handle increased ridership.

=== Tram depots ===
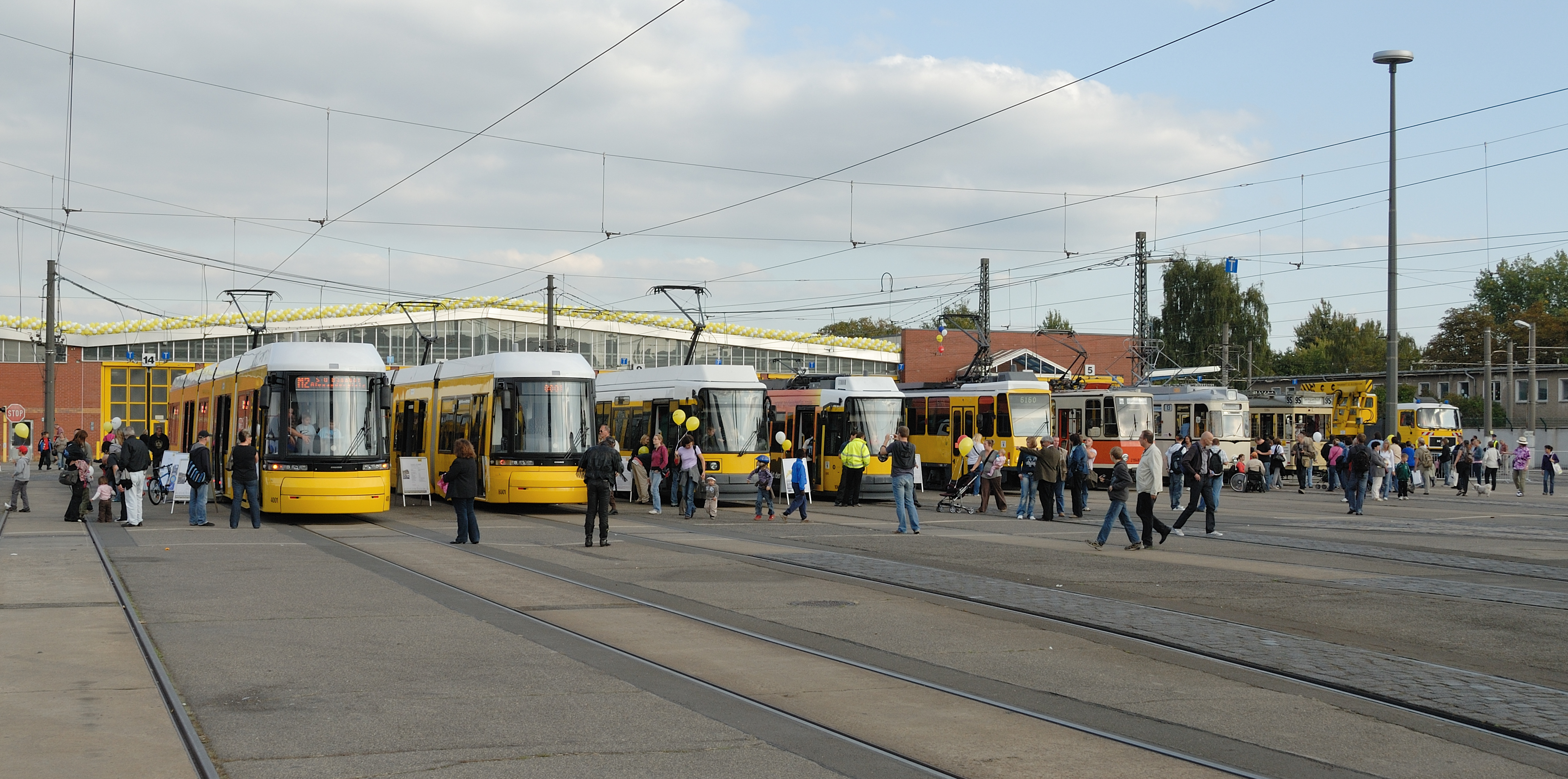
Open Day 2009 at BVG's Berlin-Lichtenberg depot. In front of the maintenance shop typical Berlin trams are presented. From left to right, new to old.

Depots are required for stabling and maintenance purposes. BVG has seven operational tram depots, five of which are used for stabling service trams:

- Kniprodestraße, in Friedrichshain on the east side of the junction of Kniprodestraße and Conrad-Blenkle-Straße. This depot is used for track storage and rail-grinding machinery only. It is on bus route 200, and the access tracks connect to tram line M10.
- Köpenick, on the west side of Wendenschloßstraße, south of the junction with Müggelheimer Straße. The depot entrance is on tram route 62.
- Lichtenberg, on the east side of Siegfriedstraße, north of Lichtenberg U-Bahn station. The depot entrance is on tram routes 21 & 37 and bus routes 240 & 256.
- Marzahn, on the south side of Landsberger Allee, east of Blumberger Damm. The depot has a tram stop on the M6 and 18 lines. Bus route 197 also passes the depot.
- Nalepastraße, on the east side of Nalepastraße, in Oberschöneweide. Right at the depot tram line 61 terminates and bus line 365 stops not far from it.
- Niederschönhausen, on the north-east corner of the junction of Deitzgenstraße and Schillerstraße. The depot is on tram line M1. It is currently not in use and the future of it is uncertain.
- Weissensee, on the north side of Bernkasteler Straße near the junction of Berliner Allee and Rennbahnstraße. The depot entrance is not directly passed by any bus or tram route, but tram routes 12 & 27 and bus routes 156, 255 & 259 serve the adjacent Berliner Allee/Rennbahnstraße tram stop.

Out-of-service trams returning to Nalepastraße and Weissensee depot remain in-service until reaching the special tram stop at each depot.

== Related systems ==
Around Berlin there are some additional tram systems that do not belong to the BVG but are integrated with the greater VBB system:

- Potsdam Tramway (lines 91–99)
- Woltersdorf Tramway (line 87, partly in Berlin)
- Schöneiche-Rüdersdorf Tramway (line 88, partly in Berlin)
- Strausberg Railway (line 89, a tram line located in the town of Strausberg)

The last three companies are located in the eastern suburbs at the eastern edge of Berlin. Each of them has only one line.

== In Art and Culture ==
- Robert Walser wrote a prose piece about the Berlin electric tram, "In the Electric Tram" (1908), which is included in the 2012 English-language collection Berlin Stories.

== See also ==
- Gross-Lichterfelde Tramway
- List of urban tram networks in Germany
- Strausberger Eisenbahn
- Trams in Germany
- Potsdam Tramway
