= Berlin Electric Tramway =

Former electric tram operator in Berlin, 1899–1920

The Berliner Elektrische Straßenbahnen Aktien-Gesellschaft lit. 'Berlin electric trams joint-stock company'; abbreviated as BESTAG, was an electric tram operator in Berlin, active from 1899 to 1920. It evolved from the electric tramways initially operated by Siemens & Halske, earning the colloquial nickname "Siemensbahn" among Berliners. In 1895, Siemens & Halske launched Berlin's first electric tram line, connecting Gesundbrunnen to Pankow. A second line opened in 1896, linking Friedrichstadt to the Great Industrial Exposition of Berlin grounds in Treptower Park. By 1916, additional routes extended to Französisch Buchholz and Rosenthal, with the Pankow and Treptow networks connected via the Lindentunnel. In 1919, Berlin, which held the majority of BESTAG's shares, converted the company into a municipally owned corporation. In December 1920, BESTAG merged with the Große Berliner Straßenbahn (SSB) and the Städtische Straßenbahnen (SSB) to form the Berlin tramway. The tram lines from Pankow to Buchholz and Rosenthal remain part of Berlin's tram network, while other BESTAG routes have been decommissioned.

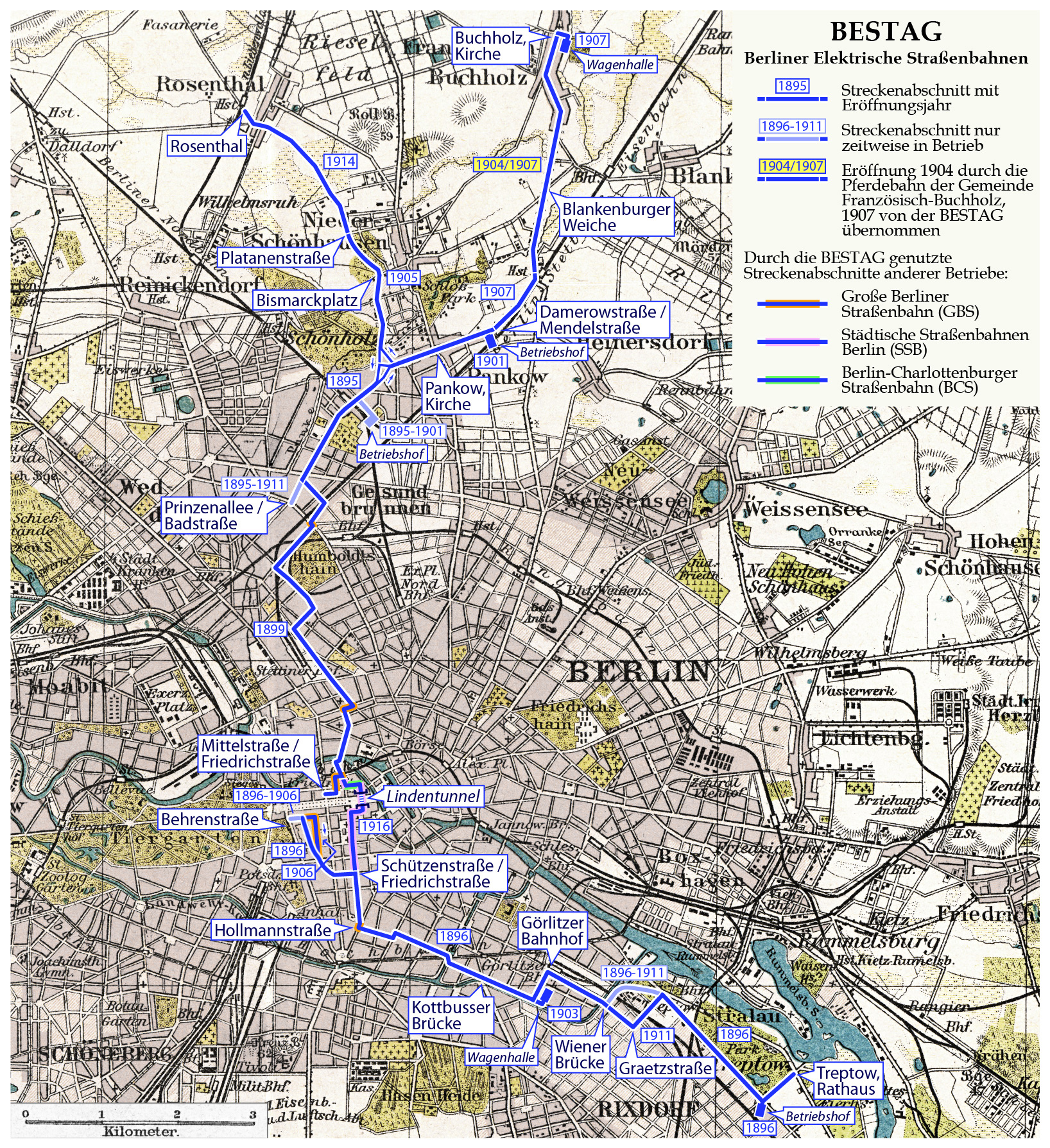
Map of the BESTAG tram network

== History ==
=== Beginnings ===
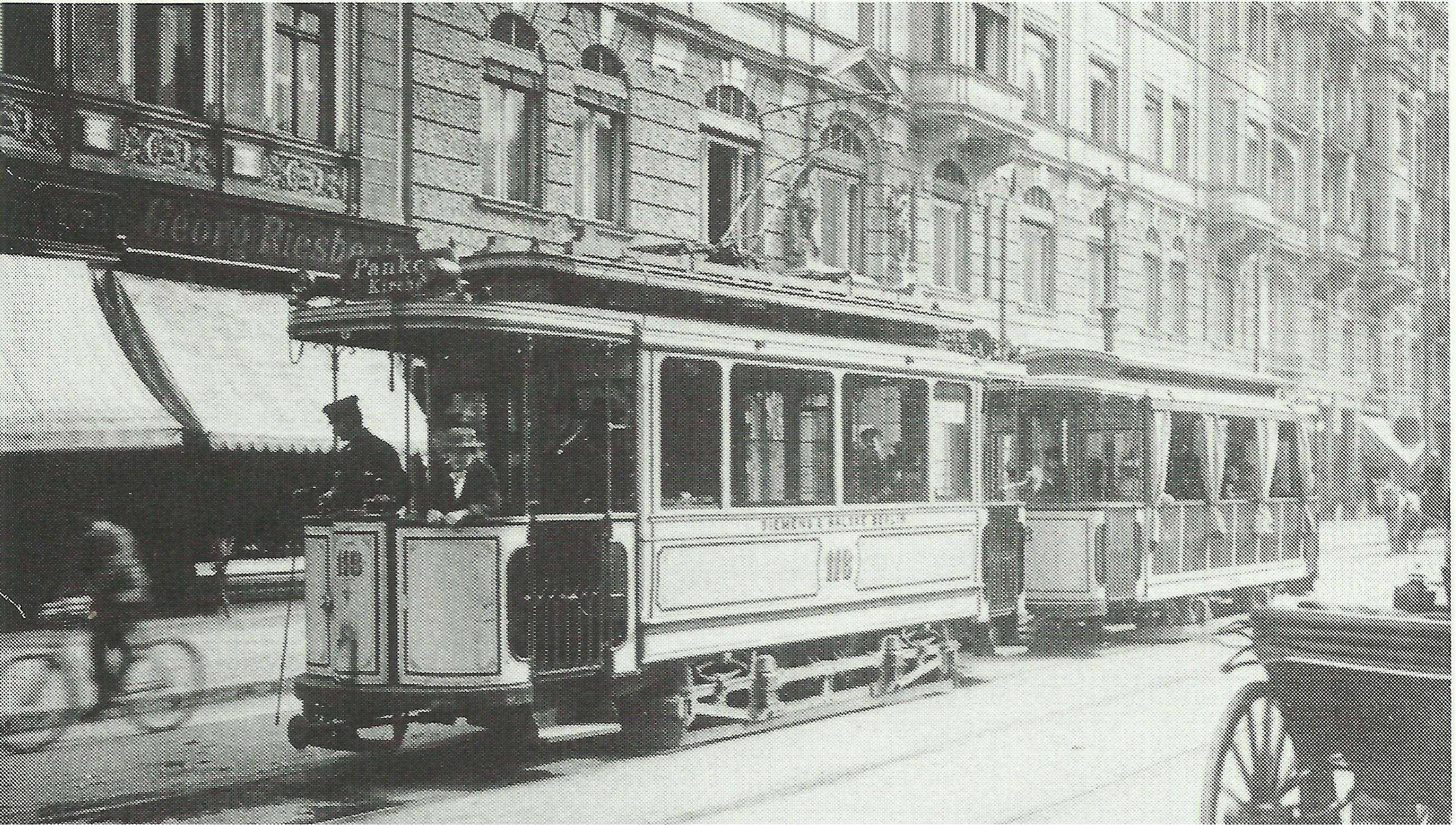
Tramcars 118 and 228, still labeled as Siemens & Halske, in Prinz-Louis-Ferdinand-Straße, around 1900

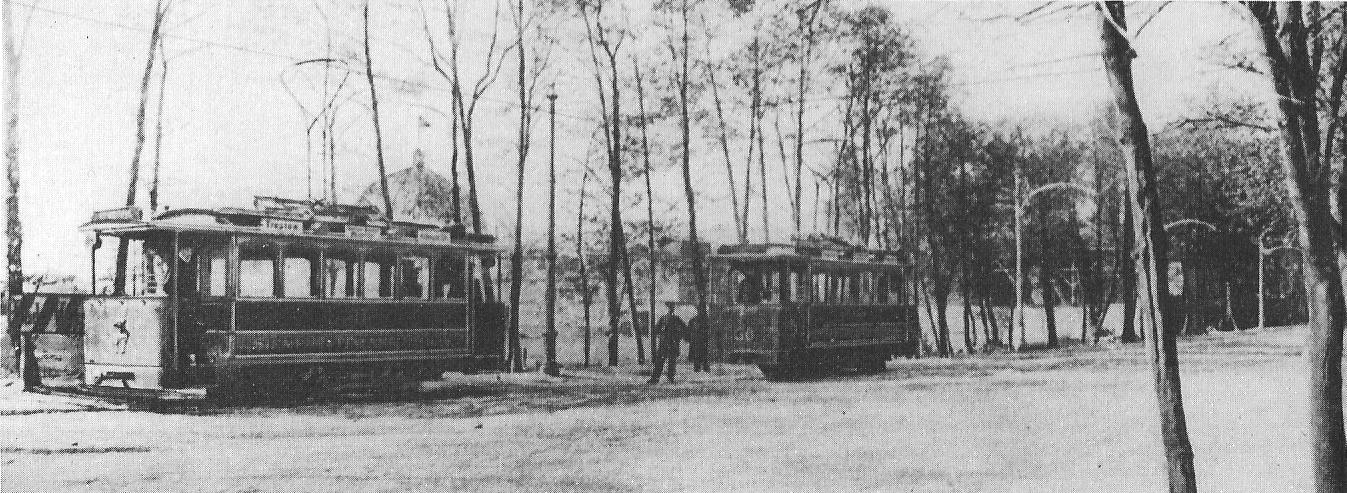
Tramcars 17 and 30 of the Treptow section in Bulgarische Straße, 1896

In the early 1890s, the Pankow rural community, linked to Berlin since 1874 by a horse-drawn tram operated by the Große Berliner Pferde-Eisenbahn (later GBS), expressed interest in a horse-drawn tram connection to Gesundbrunnen. Siemens & Halske proposed an electric tram instead. In April 1893, a contract was signed. After initial hesitation, Berlin approved the construction in May 1894. Resistance to overhead lines persisted in Berlin, with the police president's approval for their installation granted on March 19, 1895, valid for 50 years. On September 10, 1895, Berlin's first electric tram line opened, running 3.35 kilometers from the Prinzenallee and Badstraße intersection to Pankow, with 900 meters within Berlin's boundaries. The mostly double-track route passed through Prinzenallee, Wollankstraße, Breite Straße, and Damerowstraße to the Mendelstraße corner. Due to narrow streets, the return trip from Breite Straße used Spandauer Straße (now Wilhelm-Kuhr-Straße) and Kreuzstraße to Wollankstraße. Trams ran every ten minutes, with fare boxes used on weekdays and conductors collecting fares on Sundays. Power was drawn from overhead lines via a bow collector, a technology developed by Siemens engineer Walter Reichel in 1887. In contrast, GBS used roller pantographs for its electrified network.

A second line, independent of the Pankow route, was built for the 1896 Berlin Trade Exhibition in Treptower Park, with a concession granted on April 23, 1896. The first section opened a week earlier, running from Görlitzer Bahnhof via Wiener Straße, Wiener Brücke, Lohmühlenstraße, Am Schlesischen Busch, Köpenicker Landstraße (now Treptower Park), and Bulgarische Straße to Neue Krugallee in Treptow. The planned route via Ritterstraße and Reichenberger Straße was abandoned due to GBS's electrification plans there. A month later, the line extended via Grünauer Straße (now Ohlauer Straße), Kottbusser Ufer (now Paul-Lincke-Ufer), Britzer Straße (now Kohlfurter Straße), Wassertorplatz, Wassertorstraße, and Alexandrinenstraße to Hollmannstraße (no longer extant). The final section to Behrenstraße required an underground power rail for aesthetic reasons. This extension opened in two stages: on July 13, 1896, from Hollmannstraße via Lindenstraße, Markgrafenstraße, and Schützenstraße to Mauerstraße at Leipziger Straße, and on October 3, 1896, along Mauerstraße and Behrenstraße to Wilhelmstraße. Trams initially ran every six minutes, every three minutes on Sundays, later adjusted to five minutes from Behrenstraße to Görlitzer Bahnhof and 15 minutes to Treptow.

Tram Lines in 1900
Route	Frequency	Length (km)
Pankow, Damerowstraße/Mendelstraße – Pankow, Kirche – Mittelstraße/Friedrichstraße	10 min	6.2
Pankow, Kirche – Mittelstraße/Friedrichstraße	10 min	5.4
Behrenstraße/Wilhelmstraße – Görlitzer Bahnhof – Wiener Brücke – Treptow, Rathaus	10 min	9.3
Behrenstraße/Wilhelmstraße – Görlitzer Bahnhof – Wiener Brücke	10 min	6.0

To improve the Pankow line's profitability, Siemens & Halske sought an extension to Berlin's city center. A concession for a route to Mittelstraße at Friedrichstraße was granted on April 12, 1898. As major roads were already served by GBS, the route wound through side streets to Dorotheenstadt, passing via Bellermannstraße, Grüntaler Straße, Badstraße, Hochstraße, Wiesenstraße, Hussitenstraße, Feldstraße, Gartenstraße, Elsässer Straße (now Torstraße), Artilleriestraße (now Tucholskystraße), Ebertbrücke, Prinz-Friedrich-Karl-Straße (now Geschwister-Scholl-Straße), Georgenstraße, Prinz-Louis-Ferdinand-Straße (now Planckstraße), and Charlottenstraße. The extension opened in three phases: to Gartenstraße/Elsässer Straße on May 20, 1899; to Georgenstraße/Prinz-Louis-Ferdinand-Straße on October 21, 1899; and to Mittelstraße/Friedrichstraße on December 16, 1899. A short section to Prinzenallee was served by a second line until March 22, 1902, then by a shuttle tram.

=== Formation of BESTAG and network expansion ===
The Berliner Elektrische Straßenbahnen AG was established on July 1, 1899, taking over both lines on July 31, 1899, with the concession transfer finalized on June 20, 1900. The transfer of existing lines was backdated to July 1, 1899, with new lines to be owned by BESTAG upon opening. Siemens & Halske managed operations until 1911.

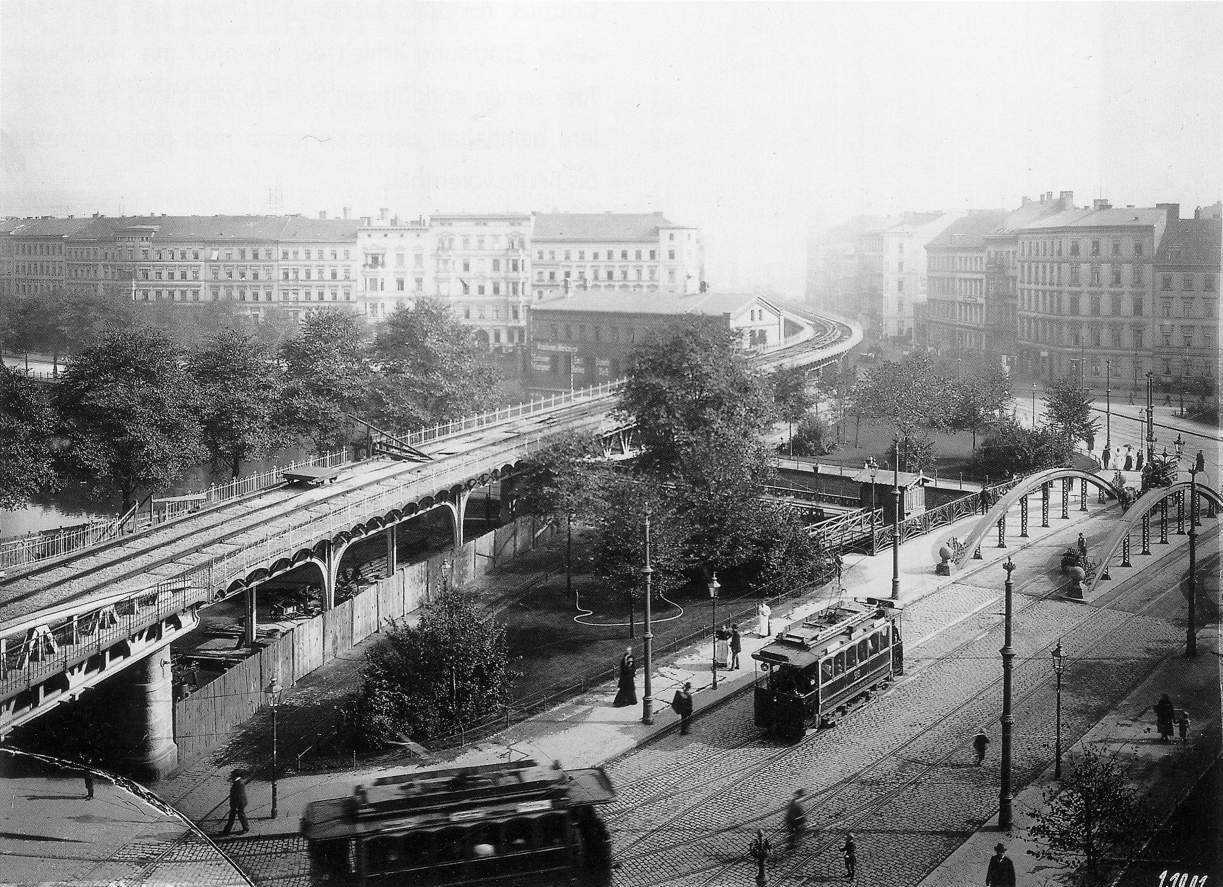
Two BESTAG tramcars at Wassertorplatz, 1901

In April 1900, tram frequency between Behrenstraße and Wiener Brücke, and Mittelstraße and Pankow Kirche, increased to five minutes, with ten-minute intervals for trams to Treptow Rathaus or Damerowstraße. Between 1902 and 1905, the Görlitzer Bahnhof to Treptow frequency was occasionally reduced to 20 minutes.

In 1901, Berlin acquired most of BESTAG's six-million-mark share capital, becoming the sole owner by 1903, effectively making BESTAG a municipal tram operator. This prevented a takeover by GBS, which could have strengthened its dominance. That year, the Behrenstraße to Hollmannstraße section switched to overhead power.

From 1905, both networks expanded. On May 8, 1905, a line from Pankow via Schönholzer Straße and Lindenstraße (now Grabbeallee) to Bismarckplatz (now Pastor-Niemöller-Platz) in Niederschönhausen opened. Trams previously terminating at Pankow Kirche now used this route. Two days later, a branch from Bismarckplatz to Kaiserweg (now Friedrich-Engels-Straße) at Platanenweg opened, served every 20 minutes by alternate trams.

On March 15, 1906, the Behrenstraße terminus was relocated to Mauerstraße, with trams turning via a loop through Kanonierstraße (now Glinkastraße) and Behrenstraße.

On July 22, 1907, BESTAG agreed to take over Französisch Buchholz's municipal horse-drawn tram, including electrifying the 3.3-kilometer line and building a connecting track along Damerowstraße to Pankow-Heinersdorf station. This was completed on December 19, 1907. The new line ran every 35 minutes from Badstraße/Prinzenallee to Französisch Buchholz Kirche, taking 29 minutes, replacing the Prinzenallee shuttle. On February 15, 1911, it extended to Mittelstraße with a 20-minute frequency, and the Bellermannstraße section was closed.

The Treptow line was rerouted on September 1, 1911, between Wiener Brücke and Köpenicker Landstraße, using Graetzstraße (now Karl-Kunger-Straße) and Bouchéstraße, abandoning Lohmühlenstraße and Am Schlesischen Busch. A turning loop was added in Graetzstraße for trams from Görlitzer Bahnhof.

On June 23, 1914, the Niederschönhausen branch extended single-track from Platanenweg via Wittenauer Straße (now Friedrich-Engels-Straße) and Lübarser Weg (now Quickborner Straße) to Rosenthal station on the Heidekrautbahn. Trams from Platanenweg ran to Rosenthal every 20 minutes, while the Bismarckplatz line operated to Platanenweg only during peak hours. In 1915, a siding to Rosenthal's estate was built for potato transport to Berlin, dismantled in 1917.

In its first 5.5-month operating year, BESTAG recorded a profit of 97,001 marks (approximately 686000 EUR in 2025). Even during the World War I in 1918, it achieved a surplus of 474,384 marks (about 858000 EUR).

=== Network connection and dissolution ===
Tram Lines in 1916
Route	Frequency	Length (km)
Buchholz, Kirche – Buchholz, Blankenburger Weiche – Pankow, Damerowstraße/Mendelstraße – Pankow, Kirche – Lindentunnel – Görlitzer Bahnhof – Wiener Brücke – Treptow, Graetzstraße	20 min	19.6
(Buchholz, Blankenburger Weiche –) Pankow, Damerowstraße/Mendelstraße – Pankow, Kirche – Lindentunnel – Görlitzer Bahnhof – Wiener Brücke – Treptow, Graetzstraße	20 min	17.6
Rosenthal – Niederschönhausen, Platanenstraße – Niederschönhausen, Bismarckplatz – Mittelstraße/Friedrichstraße	20 min	11.9
(Niederschönhausen, Platanenstraße –) Niederschönhausen, Bismarckplatz – Mittelstraße/Friedrichstraße	20 min	9.5
Behrenstraße – Görlitzer Bahnhof – Wiener Brücke – Treptow, Rathaus	10 min	9.9

Despite the proximity of the inner-city termini, connecting the networks was challenging. The Unter den Linden boulevard, controlled by the German emperor and Prussian king, required a suitable crossing. A surface crossing at the Städtische Opernhaus, electrified in 1894, prohibited overhead lines. Accumulator and underground power systems proved inadequate, leading GBS to install a single overhead wire in 1907. Further crossings or tunnels were rejected, so Berlin planned a four-track Lindentunnel to serve BESTAG, GBS, and SSB lines. Construction, interrupted by World War I, ran from mid-1914 to December 1916. The western tunnel section, opened on December 17, 1916, linked BESTAG's networks. Lines from Buchholz or Damerowstraße were rerouted via Universitätsstraße and Dorotheenstraße through the tunnel to Behrenstraße, then Markgrafenstraße to Graetzstraße, discontinuing the Behrenstraße–Graetzstraße line.

Plans for new lines from Treptow and Neukölln to Johannisthal, with tracks laid in Plesser Straße and Neuköllnische Brücke, were halted by the war.

On September 20, 1919, BESTAG was removed from the commercial register and became a municipal entity, as did GBS. This paved the way for their merger with SSB into the Berliner Straßenbahn on December 13, 1920.

=== Further development after 1920 ===
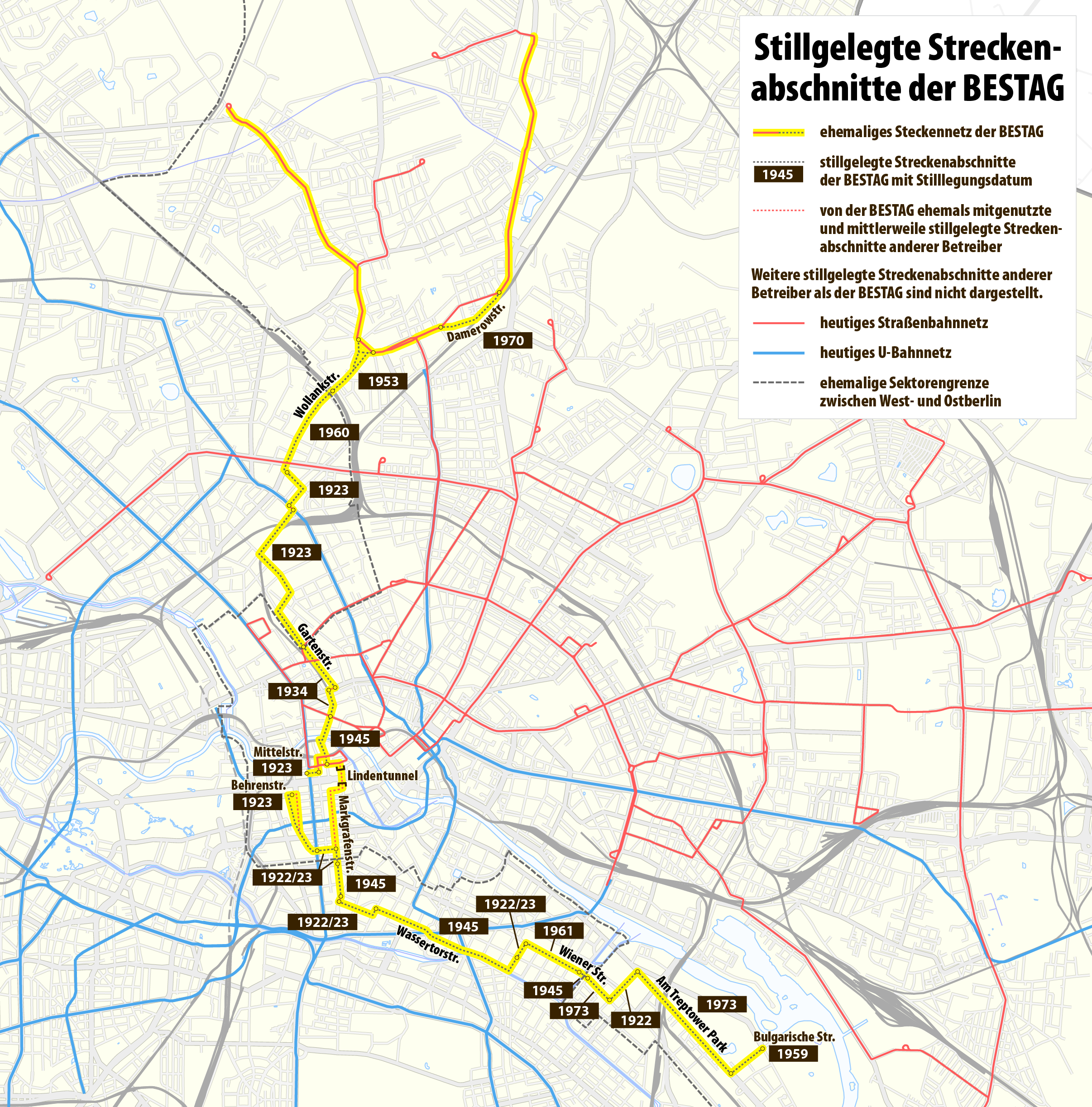
Development of the BESTAG network after 1920

In spring 1921, the former BESTAG lines were assigned numbers, with the lines terminating in Buchholz and at Damerowstraße merged into a single route:

- Line 16: Behrenstraße – Treptow, Town Hall
- Line 116: Buchholz, Church – Pankow, Damerowstraße – Treptow, Graetzstraße
- Line 30: Mittelstraße – Niederschönhausen, Bismarckplatz
- Line 130: Mittelstraße – Rosenthal

In the same year and the following one, the tracks and vehicles were converted for operation with trolley poles. However, the escalating inflation increasingly hampered BSt operations, leading to the shortening or discontinuation of several lines in 1923. By September 9, 1923, known as the "tramless day," most former BESTAG routes ceased regular service. This primarily affected tracks laid in side streets for concession reasons. Specifically, this included the section from Bellermannstraße to Prinz-Louis-Ferdinand-Straße (except Hussitenstraße), the western tunnel section of the Linden Tunnel including the connecting tracks in Behrenstraße and Markgrafenstraße, the Mauerstraße loop, the section from Hollmannstraße to Kottbusser Brücke, a short section in Grünauer Straße, and the remaining section from Wiener Brücke to Treptow. Tracks in Wassertorstraße, the Mauerstraße loop, and the connection from Gartenstraße to Prinz-Louis-Ferdinand-Straße were soon reactivated, but the other sections remained unused and were dismantled by the early 1930s. In Treptow, the Bouchéstraße track was abandoned, with a remnant used as a turning loop; trains instead used existing tracks in Plesser Straße and a route built by the former Southern Berlin suburban railway in Elsenstraße to Köpenicker Landstraße.

The remaining BESTAG inner-city tracks were abandoned by the BVG after World War II; service across the Landwehrkanal was no longer possible due to the destruction of the Wiener Brücke. The canal also became the boundary between the American and Soviet sectors. At S-Bahnhof Wollankstraße, the Soviet and French sectors met. Cross-border tram service at this point was discontinued on January 15, 1953, and tram operations in eastern Wollankstraße were abandoned. A short section continued to serve as a wye for some time. Since then, connections from Rosenthal and Buchholz to the city center have been provided via Berliner Straße and Schönhauser Allee.

The tram tracks in western Wollankstraße and Prinzenallee were decommissioned on May 2, 1960, the connection to Wiener Brücke via Wiener Straße followed on March 1, 1961, and the short section in Grünauer Straße on September 29, 1963. On the eastern side, trams operated in Bulgarische Straße until December 13, 1959. The remaining track sections in Treptow were finally abandoned by the Berliner Verkehrsbetriebe on July 14, 1973.

== Operations ==
=== Destination signs ===
Destination Signs
Destination	Color
Prinzenallee/Badstraße	White/Yellow
Pankow, Kirche	White/Red (until 1916); Red/Yellow (from 1916)
Pankow, Damerowstraße/Mendelstraße	Red
Buchholz, Blankenburger Weiche	Yellow/Ochre
Franz.-Buchholz, Kirche (until 1914); Buchholz, Kirche (from 1914)	Yellow
Niederschönhausen, Bismarckplatz	Blue
Niederschönhausen, Platanenstraße	Blue/Yellow (1907); White/Blue (1909/10); Blue (1910/15); Blue/Yellow (1916/19)
Rosenthal	Yellow/Blue (until 1916); Blue/White (from 1916)
Mittelstraße/Friedrichstraße	White
Behrenstraße	White
Schützenstraße/Friedrichstraße	White
Hollmannstraße	Green
Kottbusser Brücke	Blue/White
Görlitzer Bahnhof	White (until 1907); Blue (from 1909)
Treptow, Graetzstraße	Blue (until 1916); Red/Yellow (from 1916)
Treptow, Rathaus	Red

In the early years until around 1904–1905, tram lines used colored signal boards for identification. The Behrenstraße–Treptow line was marked with green signal boards, while the Behrenstraße–Görlitzer Bahnhof and Mittelstraße–Pankow lines used white boards. Subsequently, only the individual terminal stops were indicated with distinct destination signs, rather than the lines themselves. These signs were either single- or two-colored, with the latter typically divided diagonally from the bottom left to the top right. Line numbers were sometimes listed in timetable booklets, but their use was subject to frequent changes.

In spring 1921, the Berlin tram system introduced line numbers on the former lines of the BESTAG.

=== Fares ===
Initially, the Pankow and Treptow sections had different fare structures, unified in 1916. Pankow lines charged a flat 10-pfennig fare from opening, retained after acquiring the Buchholz tram. After extending to Mittelstraße, the full Buchholz line cost 15 pfennigs, with 10 pfennigs for Mittelstraße to Damerowstraße or Badstraße to Buchholz. The same applied to Rosenthal: 15 pfennigs for the full route, 10 pfennigs for Mittelstraße–Platanenstraße or Badstraße–Rosenthal.

Treptow's longer routes used a tiered fare, initially 30 pfennigs for the full line, reduced to 25 pfennigs with the Behrenstraße extension in 1896, with segments at 20, 15, and 10 pfennigs. In May 1898, a 10-pfennig flat fare was adopted.

No fare data exists for December 1916 to 1919. In mid-1919, the Zweckverband Groß-Berlin set a 12.5-pfennig flat fare with most tram operators, including BESTAG. Single tickets cost 15 pfennigs, double tickets 25 pfennigs, and eight-ride passes 1 mark. Inflation raised the flat fare to 20 pfennigs later in 1919 (double tickets 35 pfennigs, passes 1.40 marks). After 1920, this unified fare applied to most Berliner Straßenbahn lines.

=== Routes ===
BESTAG routes were mostly double-track, except for Bismarckplatz–Rosenthal, Pankow-Heinersdorf–Buchholz, and parts of Wollankstraße. In 1916, single-track routes totaled 7.22 kilometers, double-track 19.60 kilometers, with a total track length of 48.98 kilometers. Power was drawn via bow collectors, unlike GBS's roller pantographs. Operating voltage was 500–550 volts.

BESTAG routes intersected with GBS and SSB at several points, occasionally sharing tracks. SSB intersections posed no operational issues, but GBS overlaps did, due to differing current collection systems. Short shared sections used joint tracks, while Lindenstraße and Markgrafenstraße had four tracks for separate operations until around 1905. Overhead lines on shared sections typically supported both collector types, though some, like Charlottenstraße, had dual lines at different heights.

Power supply at crossings was managed by one operator, with track separators isolating lines before and after. Trams from the other operator crossed with their controllers off.

The following tables list routes used by BESTAG from other operators and BESTAG routes used by others, notably GBS, which rerouted lines from 1914 to avoid disrupting U6 construction.

Routes Used by BESTAG
Section	Operator
Badstraße	GBS
Elsässer Straße	GBS
Prinz-Louis-Ferdinand-Straße – Charlottenstraße	GBS
Universitätsstraße	SSB
Dorotheenstraße	BCS
Lindentunnel – Behrenstraße – Markgrafenstraße (to Schützenstraße)	SSB
Kanonierstraße (one track only)	GBS
Mauerstraße (between Leipziger Straße and Kanonierstraße)	GBS
Lindenstraße	GBS

Routes Used by Other Operators
Section	Operator	Since
Hussitenstraße (between Grenzstraße and Voltastraße)	SSB	July 1, 1908
Gartenstraße (between Bernauer Straße and Invalidenstraße)	SSB	July 1, 1908
Artilleriestraße (from Oranienburger Straße) – Ebertbrücke – Prinz-Friedrich-Karl-Straße – Georgenstraße	GBS	January 3, 1914
Artilleriestraße – Ebertbrücke – Prinz-Friedrich-Karl-Straße	SSB	December 17, 1916
Mauerstraße (between Leipziger Straße and Krausenstraße)	GBS	March 6, 1914
Markgrafenstraße (between Schützenstraße and Lindenstraße)	SSB	May 10, 1913
Hollmannstraße (between Lindenstraße and Alte Jakobstraße)	SSB	May 10, 1913
Grünauer Straße	GBS	April 2, 1903
Grünauer Straße	SSB	December 20, 1912

=== Vehicles ===
==== Fleet development ====
Until the merger in December 1916, the Pankow and Treptow divisions of the Berliner Elektrische Straßenbahn-Aktiengesellschaft (BESTAG) operated distinct vehicle types that were not interchanged. Vehicle numbers 1 to 9 were temporarily assigned in both divisions.

The eight motor trams that launched electric tram operations in 1895 had 15-kilowatt motors. Each tram’s body, mounted on a compact chassis, featured four nearly square windows per side and a lantern roof. One tram (either number 1 or 8) was retired in 1897/98, while the others were renumbered 141 to 148 between 1911 and 1916. By 1920, all but trams 142 and 143 were retired; these two served as work trams A22 and A23 until 1923.

Pankow’s tram 9 was a unique vehicle, similar in design to Treptow’s series 1–30 but equipped for mixed operation with accumulators and overhead lines. Its heavy accumulators required two short, two-axle bogies. Tested on the Pankow branch, it was transferred to Budapest in 1899. Some sources claim Pankow initially had nine identical trams, with tram 9 renumbered to 149 by 1916 and used as work tram A35 from 1920 to 1923. Reports suggest this work tram was four-axled, indicating it may have returned from Budapest or never left.

In 1899, Pankow expanded its fleet with 32 motor trams, 20 identical trailers, and 20 summer trailers with central aisles, all with open platforms. The motor trams were converted to trailers in 1924 and, along with the identical trailers, remained in service until 1929. The summer trailers were retired by 1925.

Treptow’s initial fleet was larger and more diverse to accommodate visitors to an industrial exhibition. It included 30 enclosed motor trams, 10 identical trailers, seven summer motor trams, 19 summer trailers, and 16 repurposed horse-drawn trams, all with open platforms. The motor trams were designed for mixed overhead and underground power supply. In 1899, two summer motor trams were sold to the United States. Between 1901 and 1903, the remaining summer motor trams received enclosed sidewalls, and the summer trailers were fitted with central aisles. The horse-drawn trams were retired by 1908. Converted motor trams served as work trams from 1916, with their later fate unclear. Other vehicles were taken over by the Berlin tram system and retired between 1925 and 1927.

In 1907, BESTAG acquired three horse-drawn trams from the Französisch-Buchholz tramway, originally from Hamburg, and converted them to electric trailers. These were retired in 1911.

In 1911, Pankow received eight Maximum motor trams from Falkenried, and Treptow received ten matching trailers. These resembled trams used by Berlin’s municipal tramway since 1908, differing mainly in bogie design. The Maximum trams received standard Berlin platforms in 1924 and were designated TDS 08/24 from 1934. The last were retired in 1969, some repurposed in the Reko program. The trailers were converted to motor trams in 1924, designated T 08/24 from 1934. In West Berlin, these were withdrawn from regular service in 1951, with three serving as work trams until 1962. In East Berlin, two were transferred to Cottbus and Dessau in 1959.

With the 1916 Lindentunnel opening and division merger, BESTAG acquired ten seven-window motor trams with enclosed platforms. An additional ten were delivered in 1921 under the Berlin tramway’s management. These were designated TF 21 S from 1934. In West Berlin, nine were converted to work trams in 1955/56 and retired by 1967. In East Berlin, seven of eleven were transferred to Plauen, Strausberg, Karl-Marx-Stadt, and Magdeburg, with the rest retired by 1959. Tram 4304 was Karl-Marx-Stadt’s first standard-gauge vehicle, serving as work tram 1076. One tram is preserved at the German Museum of Technology in Berlin, and another, damaged in a 2008 fire, is at the Schmöckwitz depot.

==== Fleet overview ====
The table below lists BESTAG’s tramcars and trailers, sorted by initial number, with manufacturer and post-1920 fate. Pankow and Treptow are distinguished, except for 1916 tramcars used across both.

Fleet overview
Year	Manufacturer	Numbers (to 1920)	Division	Numbers (from 1920)	Fate
Tramcars
1895	Van der Zypen & Charlier	1–8	Pankow		Renumbered 141–148 in 1916; 142 and 143 converted to A22 and A23 in 1920, retired 1923; others retired by 1920
1895	Van der Zypen & Charlier (?)	9	Pankow		Four-axle test tram for mixed overhead/battery; sent to Budapest in 1899
1896	Van der Zypen & Charlier	1–30	Treptow	4230–4253	4246 and 4252 converted to trailers 1775 and 1776 in 1924; retired 1925/27
1896	Görlitz	31–37	Treptow		Summer trams; 36 and 37 sold to USA in 1898/99; 31–35 enclosed 1901/03; used as work trams 1916–1918
1899	Falkenried	101–132	Pankow	4254–4285	Converted to trailers 1777–1808 in 1924; retired 1929
1911	Falkenried	133–140	Pankow	5432–5439	Maximum tramcars; renumbered 5315^{II}–5322^{II} in 1927; 5316^{II} and 5318^{II} to BVG-Ost, retired 1969 (Reko 5126 and 5127); others to BVG-West, retired 1955
1916 (1921)	Falkenried	220–229 (230–239)		4286–4295 (4296–4305)	10 more ordered by BSt in 1921; nine to BVG-West, converted to work trams (H18, H19, A391–A397) 1955/56, retired 1967; 224 preserved at Deutsches Technikmuseum Berlin; 11 to BVG-Ost; 4292, 4299 to Magdeburg (718, 719); 4301 to Plauen (55^{II}); 4302, 4305 to Strausberg (2^{II}, 8^{II}), 2^{II} retired 1966, 8^{II} returned to Berlin, damaged 2008; 4303, 4304 to Karl-Marx-Stadt (1076, 938)
Trailers
1896	Falkenried	38–56	Treptow	1666–1684	Summer trailers; center aisle added 1901; retired 1925
1896	Falkenried	57–66	Treptow	1685–1694	Renumbered 1715–1724 in 1924; retired 1925
	Falkenried	67–82	Treptow		Horse-drawn trams from Hamburg; acquired 1896; sold 1908
1911	Falkenried	83–92	Treptow	1715–1724	Converted to tramcars 3251^{II}–3260^{II} in 1924; 3252^{II} lost in war; 3257^{II} to Cottbus (41), retired 1968; 3260^{II} to Dessau (38^{III}), retired 1964; 3254^{II}, 3258^{II}, 3259^{II} to BVG-West, converted to A364, A358 (A408), A365, retired 1961/62; others retired 1951
1899	Falkenried	150–169	Pankow	1695–1714	Trailers for tramcars 101–132; retired 1929
1880		170–172	Pankow		Ex-Französisch Buchholz; retired 1911
1899	Falkenried	200–219	Pankow	1725–1744	Summer trailers; retired 1925

=== Depots ===
==== Brehmestraße depot ====
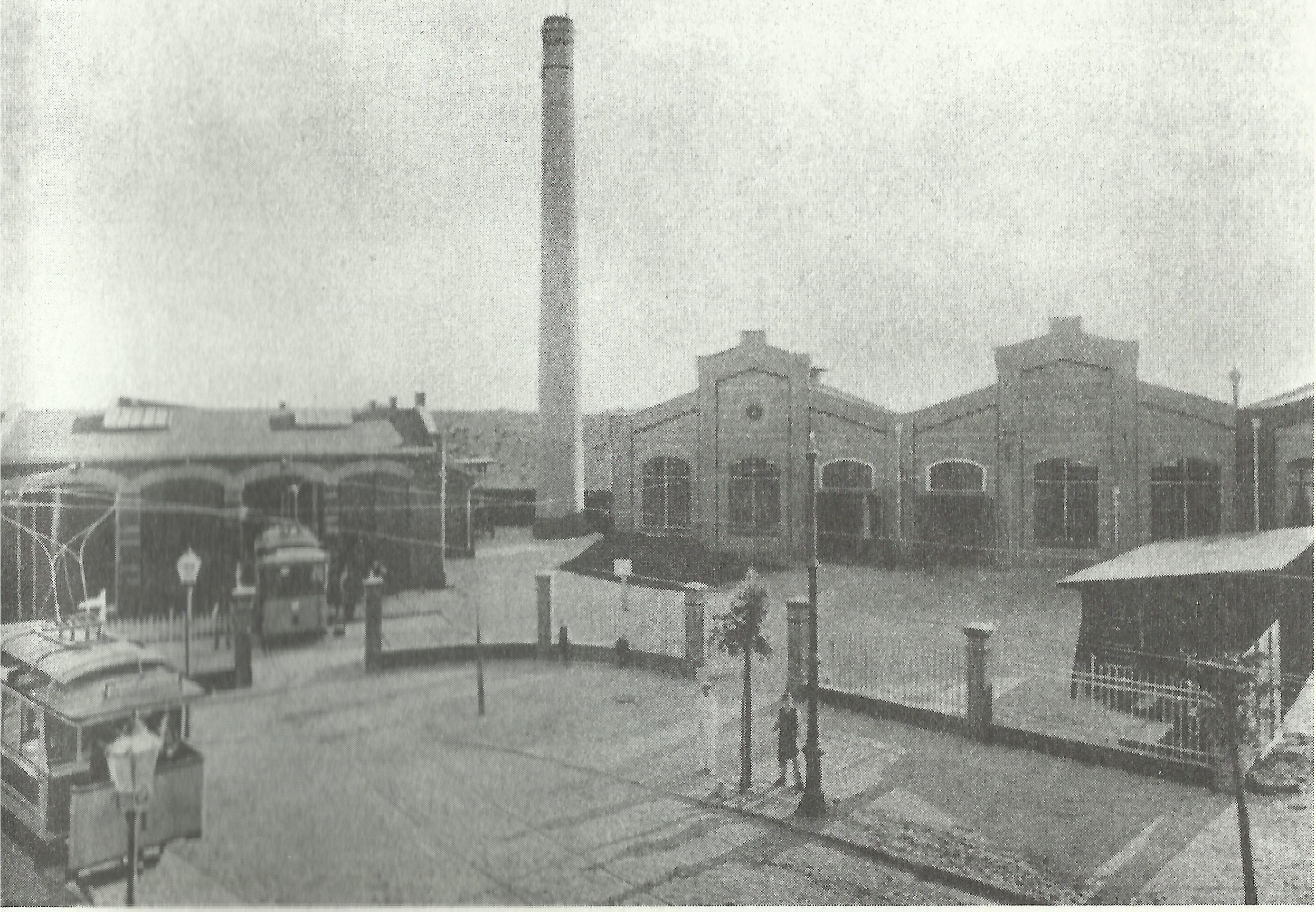
Brehmestraße depot with attached power plant, circa 1900

The oldest depot of the Siemensbahn was located on Brehmestraße, accessible via a spur line from Wollankstraße. It featured a four-track tram shed, with tracks 2 and 4 directly connected, while the other two were accessible only via a transfer table. The shed's floor was 1.5 meters below the tracks, which rested on iron supports. Behind the shed were a workshop and a two-track open-air storage area. Administrative offices were attached to the side of the shed.

The depot also housed a power plant to supply electricity for the tramway. Steam and dynamo machines were installed in duplicate as a backup system. The compound steam engines directly powered the dynamos, which generated the necessary traction current. Boiler feedwater was supplied by an on-site well.

The depot operated from 1895 to 1901 and was sold in 1903.

==== Damerowstraße depot ====
The Damerowstraße depot was constructed in 1901 due to insufficient space at Brehmestraße following the acquisition of additional trams. It had capacity for 93 vehicles. In 1920, it was taken over by the Berliner Straßenbahn as Depot XVIII but was closed shortly thereafter. In 1936, a residential block was built along the street front.

==== Französisch-Buchholz tram shed ====
For the Buchholz line, a small depot was established on Gravensteinstraße after BESTAG's takeover. Covering 620 square meters, it accommodated three trams. It was closed following the transition to the Berliner Straßenbahn and is now used by the Buchholz volunteer fire department.

==== Köpenicker Landstraße depot ====
The Köpenicker Landstraße depot in Treptow opened on April 15, 1896, with the launch of the Treptow line. It comprised two shed buildings with space for 75 trams: the front building served as the tram shed, and the rear as a workshop, connected by a transfer table for track switching. The sheds had eight tracks each, accommodating five to six trams per track. On the south side, two tracks ran alongside the sheds, and one track on the north. The site was surrounded by allotment gardens. After 1920, it was operated as Depot XXI and used to store surplus trams.

From 1925, the site was used for overhauling various tram types. In addition to modifications by the Neue Automobil Gesellschaft, HAWA trams and Flachbahn railcars were refurbished here.

In 1931, the workshop shed was destroyed in a major fire. Two years later, during the expansion of Köpenicker Landstraße, the track connections to the tram shed were removed, though the southern outdoor tracks remained for emptying vacuum trucks. The shed likely served for bus maintenance thereafter.

During World War II, the shed was destroyed by bombing and subsequently demolished. The site has since been used for allotment gardening.

==== Kottbusser Ufer tram shed ====
From May 1903, BESTAG operated a tram shed with a maintenance office at Kottbusser Ufer 20–22 for storing trailers and flatcars. Located near Grünauer Straße, the wooden shed measured approximately 28 × 18.5 meters and had four tracks with capacity for twelve vehicles. During low-traffic periods, trailers were detached at the Kottbusser Ufer and Grünauer Straße intersection and towed to the shed by a Pankow Series 1–8 railcar. BESTAG used the site until around 1920. Subsequently, plots 19–20 were repurposed by the Berliner Entwässerungswerke for a pumping station, and plots 21–22 were used by BEWAG for a new substation.
