= List of equestrian statues in Germany =

This is a list of equestrian statues in Germany.

Town	Monument	Picture
Berlin City	King Friedrich II by Christian Daniel Rauch in the Unter den Linden	
Berlin City	King Friedrich Wilhelm IV by Alexander Calandrelli in front of the Alte Nationalgalerie	
Berlin City	Emperor Wilhelm I.-National Monument by Reinhold Begas in front of the Berlin City Palace, 1897-03-22, destroyed	
Berlin-Rixdorf	Emperor Wilhelm I by Albert Moritz Wolff at the Hohenzollernplatz, 1902, destroyed in 1944	
Berlin-Spandau	Emperor Wilhelm I by Franz Dorrenbach in the Neuendorfer Straße	
Berlin City	Emperor Friedrich III. by Rudolf Maison in front of Bode Museum, 1904, destroyed in 1950s.	
Berlin City	Saint George defeats the Dragon	
Aachen	Emperor Friedrich III by Hugo Lederer at the Kaiserplatz, 1911.	
Aachen	Emperor Wilhelm I by Fritz Schaper, 1901. Destroyed in 1942.	
Altötting	Field Marshal Johann t’Serclaes by Sebastian Osterrieder at the Kapellplatz	
Bad Frankenhausen	Kyffhäuser Monument with Emperor Wilhelm I. by Bruno Schmitz and Emil Hundrieser on top of the Kyffhäuser Mountain, 1890–1896	
Bamberg	The Bamberg Horseman (Bamberger Reiter, possibly showing Hungarian King Stephen I), Cathedral, c. 1225-37.	
Bautzen	King Albert by Walter Hauschild on the south side of the Lauenturm, 1913	
Bernburg	Emperor Wilhelm I by Ludwig Manzel, 1901, destroyed	
Braunschweig	Duke Karl Wilhelm Ferdinand by Franz Pönninger, foundry Georg Ferdinand Howaldt Duke Friedrich Wilhelm by Ernst Hähnel, foundry Georg Ferdinand Howaldt in front of the Braunschweiger Schloss	
Bremen	Emperor Friedrich III by Louis Tuaillon in the Herrmann-Böse-Str.	
Bremen	Chancellor Bismarck by Adolf von Hildebrand close to Bremer Dom, 1910	
Bremen	Emperor Wilhelm I by Robert Bärwald, 1888–1893, destroyed in 1942.	
Bremen	Two statues of Heralds by Rudolf Maison forward of the East Gate of the Town Hall, 1901. Removed during WW2, restored in 2007.	
Chemnitz	Emperor Wilhelm I at the Rathausmarkt by Wilhelm von Rümann, 1899. Destroyed in Autumn of 1945.	
Cologne	King Friedrich Wilhelm IV by Gustav Blaeser, Hohenzollernbrücke (Deutz side)	
Cologne	Emperor Wilhelm I by Friedrich Drake, Hohenzollernbrücke (Deutz side)	
Cologne	Emperor Friedrich III by Louis Tuaillon, Hohenzollernbrücke (Cologne side)	
Cologne	Emperor Wilhelm II by Louis Tuaillon, Hohenzollernbrücke (Cologne side)	
Cologne	Emperor Wilhelm I by Richard Anders, 1890-1900, destroyed	
Cologne	King Friedrich Wilhelm III by Gustav Blaeser at the Heumarkt, 1878	
Coburg	Duke Ernest II by Gustav Eberlein in the Hofgarten	
Darmstadt	Grand Duke Ludwig IV by Friedrich Schaper at the Luisenplatz, 1898	
Dresden	King August II (Goldener Reiter) at the Neustädter Markt square	
Dresden	King Albert by Max Baumbach in front of the Ständehaus, destroyed in 1950	
Dortmund	Emperor Wilhelm I by Adolf von Donndorf in Hohensyburg, 1897-1902	
Düsseldorf	Duke Johann Wilhelm by Gabriël Grupello	
Düsseldorf	Emperor Wilhelm I by Karl Janssen at the Martin-Luther-Platz	
Erfurt	Emperor Wilhelm I by Ludwig Brunow, 1900, destroyed in 1942	
Essen	Emperor Wilhelm I by Hermann Volz at the Burgplatz, 1898	
Freiburg im Breisgau	Zähringenes by Todor Bozhinov	
Frankfurt am Main	Emperor Wilhelm I by Clemens Buscher, 1896, destroyed in 1940	
Gera	Emperor Wilhelm I by Gustav Eberlein close to Johanniskirche, destroyed	
Geislingen	Emperor Wilhelm I by Gustav Eberlein at the Kirchplatz	
Goslar	Emperor Wilhelm I by Walter Schott at the Kaiserpfalz	
Goslar	Emperor Friedrich I Barbarossa at the Kaiserpfalz	
Halle an der Saale	Emperor Wilhelm I by Peter Breuer and Bruno Schmitz, destroyed in World War II	
Hamburg	Emperor Wilhelm I by Johannes Schilling in Planten un Blomen, 1903	
Hamburg-Altona	Emperor Wilhelm I by Gustav Eberlein in front of the Townhall, 1898	
Hannover	Ernest Augustus, King of Hanover, by Albert Wolff in front of central station	

== Karlsruhe ==
- Memorial to Baden dragoon in World War I (Leibdragonerdenkmal) by close to the Mühlburger Tor.
- Emperor Wilhelm I by Adolf Heer at the Kaiserplatz, 1897
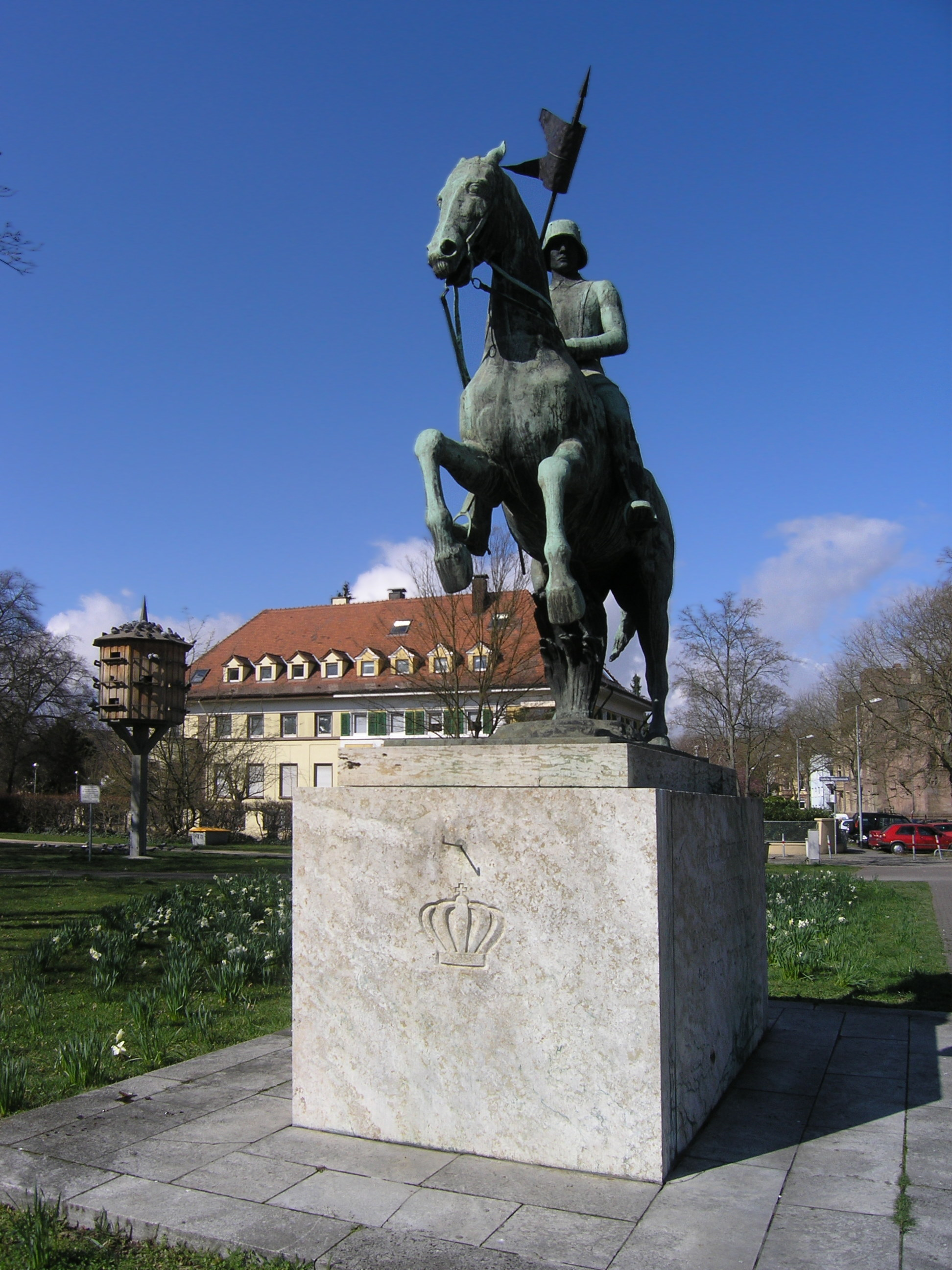
Leibdragonerdenkmal

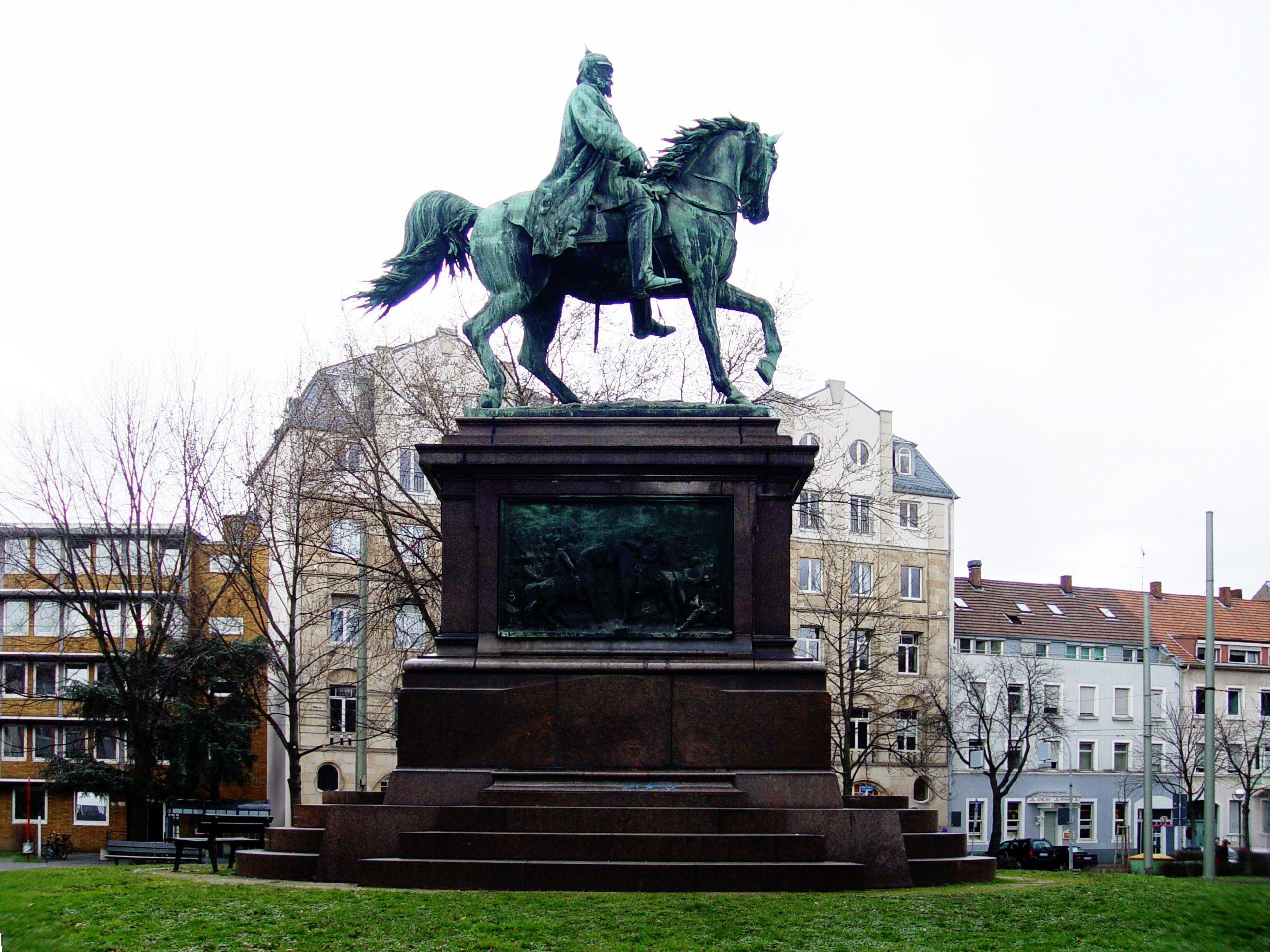
Kaiser Wilhelm

== Kiel ==
- Emperor Wilhelm I by Adolf Brütt in the Schlosspark, 1896.

== Koblenz ==
- German Corner - the monument of Emperor Wilhelm I by Emil Hundrieser. It is the tallest of the Kaiser Wilhelm equestrian monuments, the sculpture itself is 14 meters high.
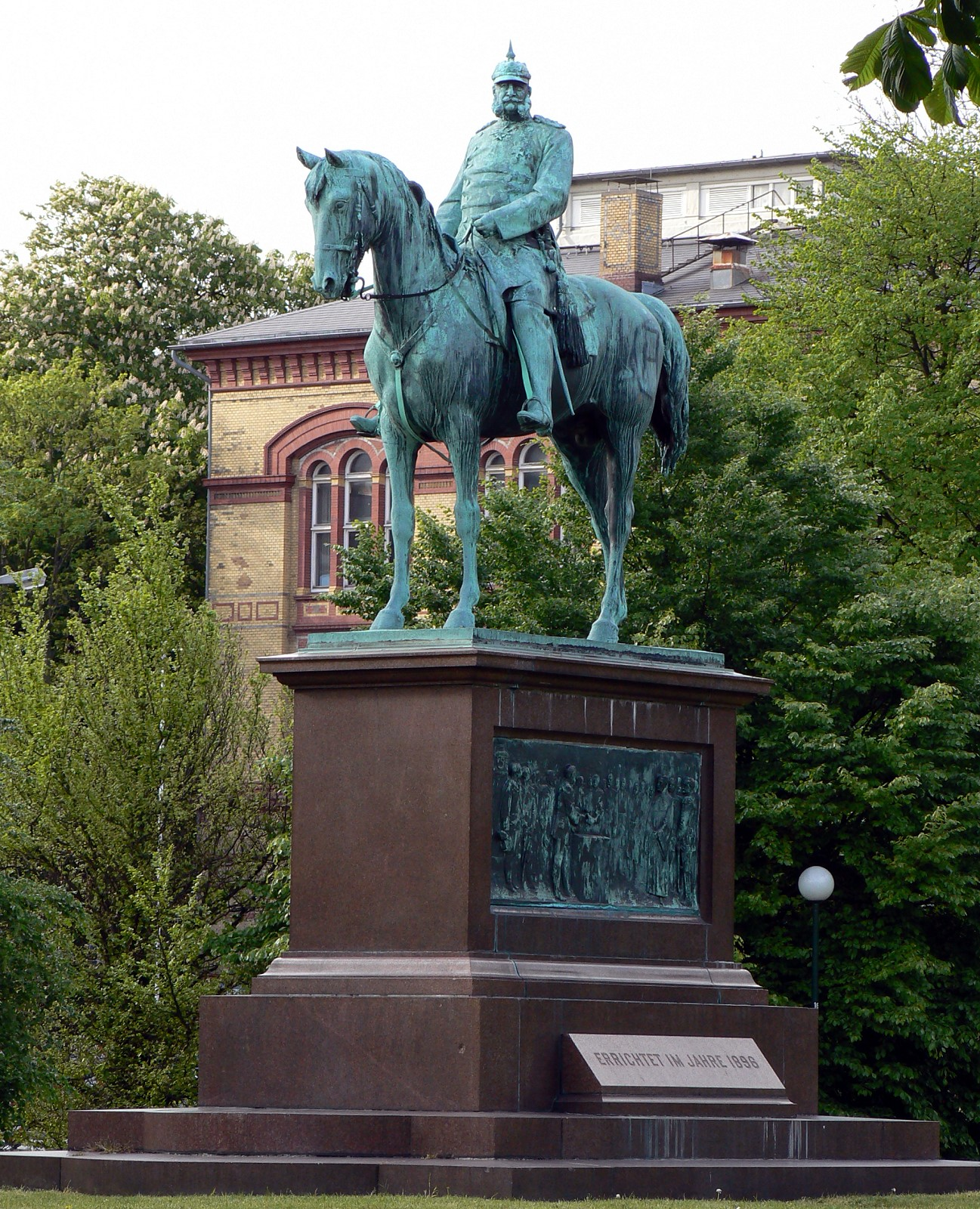
Emperor Wilhelm I in Kiel

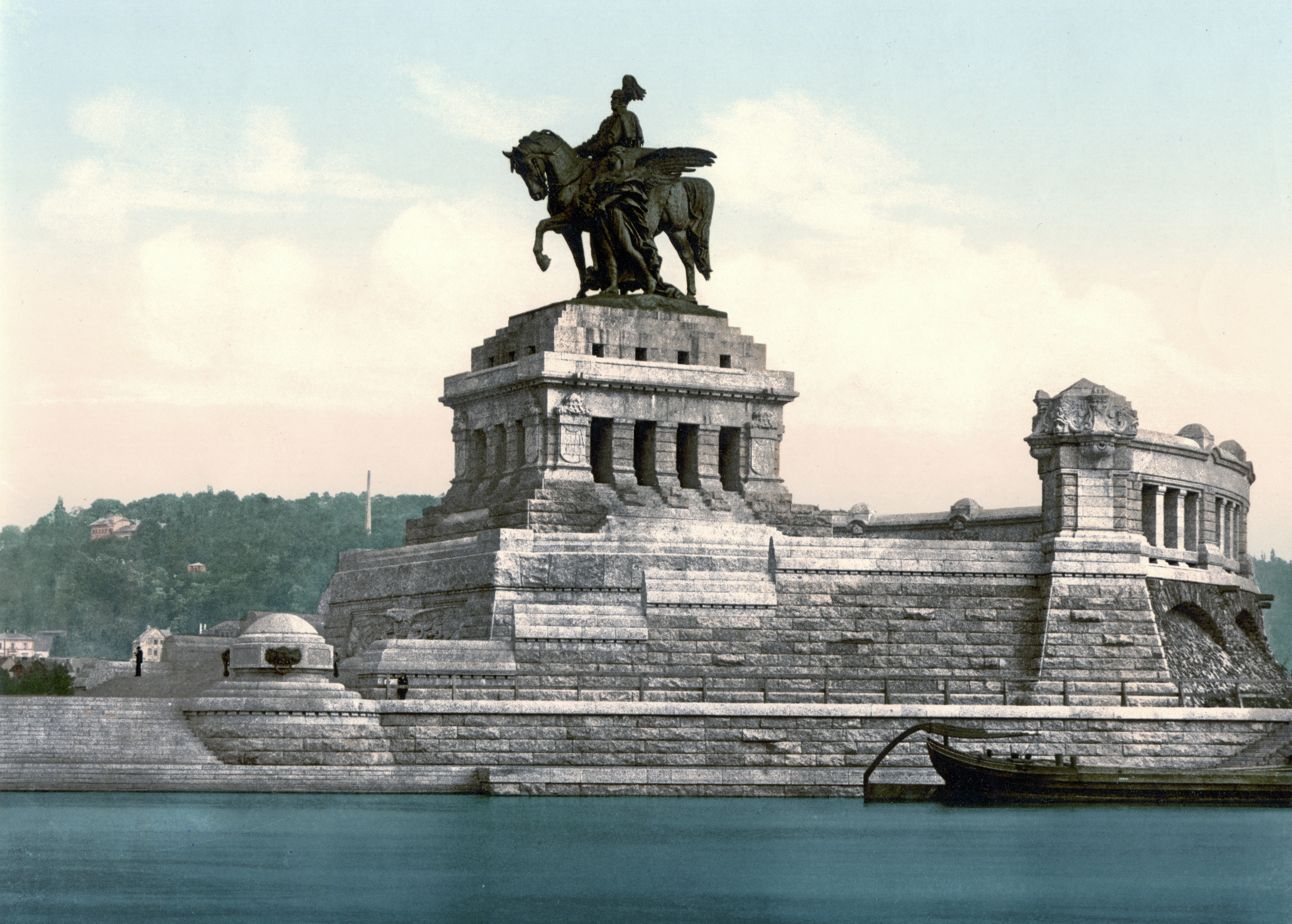
German Corner in Koblenz at about 1900

== Krefeld ==
- Memorial to fallen Krefelder Tanzhusaren at the Grafschaftsplatz, 1929.

== Lübeck ==
- Emperor Wilhelm I by Louis Tuaillon between Central station und Lindenplatz.

== Magdeburg ==
- Magdeburg Horseman (Magdeburger Reiter, probably showing Emperor Otto I the Great), ca. 1240. It is the first equestrian sculpture north of the Alps.
- Emperor Wilhelm I at the Universitätsplatz, destroyed.
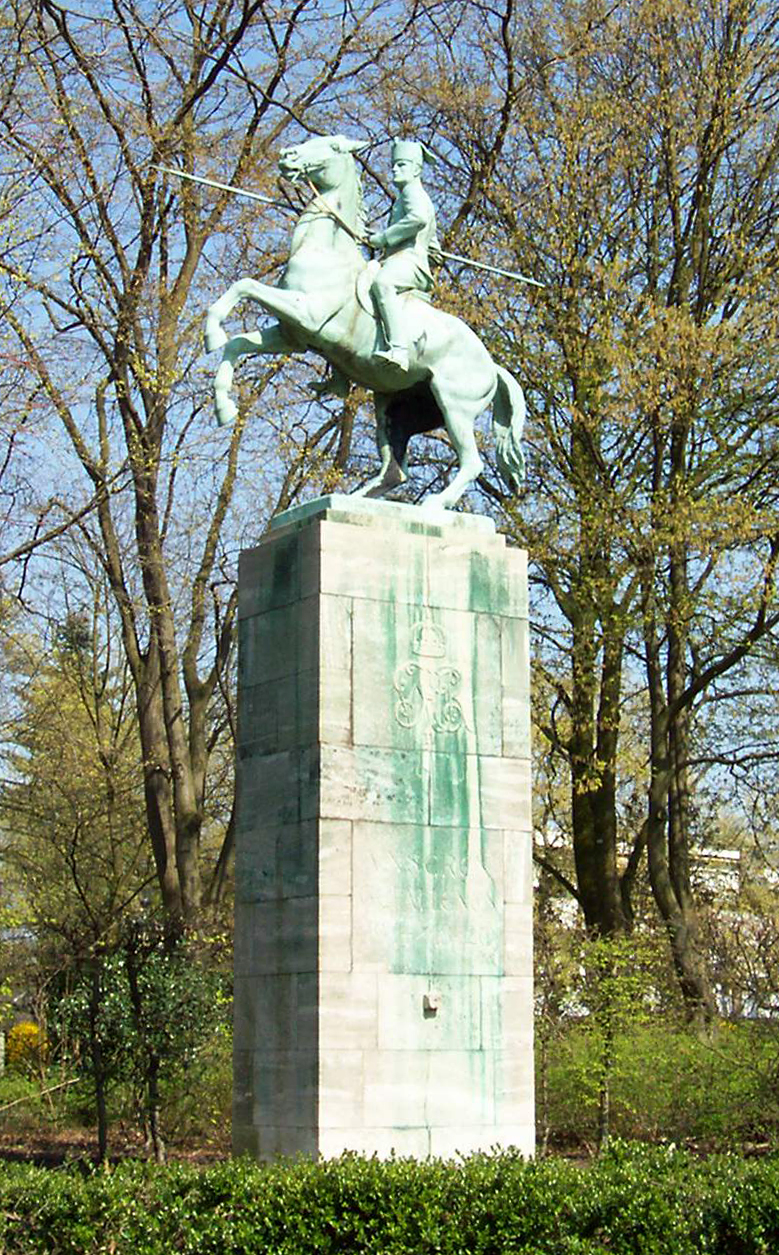
Memorial to Tanzhusaren in Krefeld

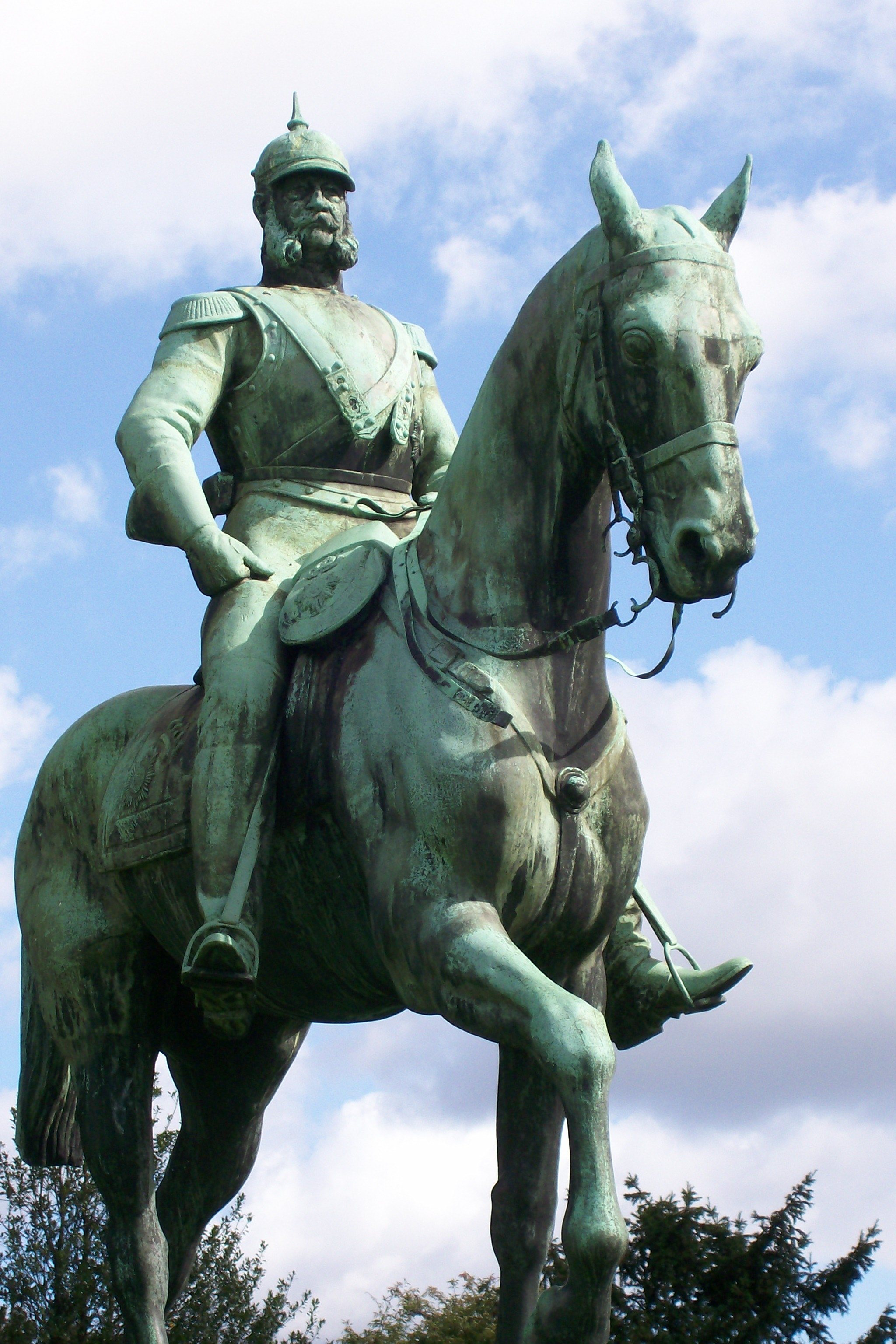
Emperor Wilhelm I in Lübeck

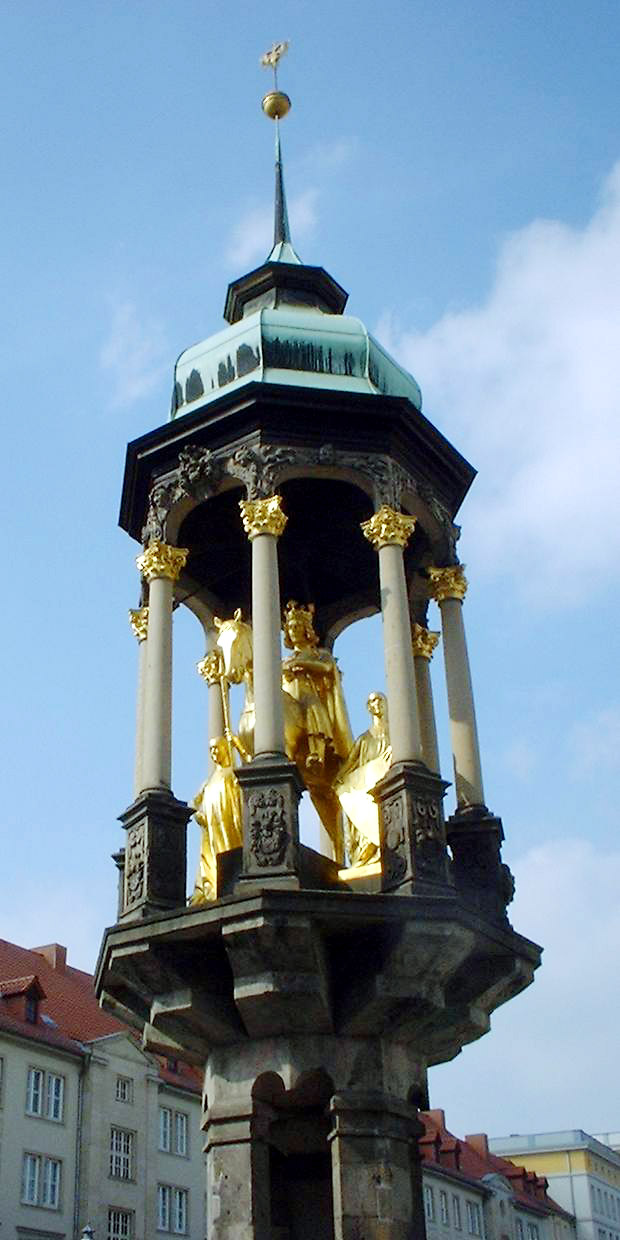
Magdeburg Horseman in Magdeburg

== Merseburg ==
- King Friedrich Wilhelm III by Louis Tuaillon.

== Munich ==
- Elector Maximilian I by Bertel Thorvaldsen at the Wittelsbacherplatz.
- King Ludwig I by Max von Widnmann at the Odeonsplatz, 1862.

== Nuremberg ==
- Emperor Wilhelm I by Wilhelm von Rümann at the Egidienplatz, 1905.
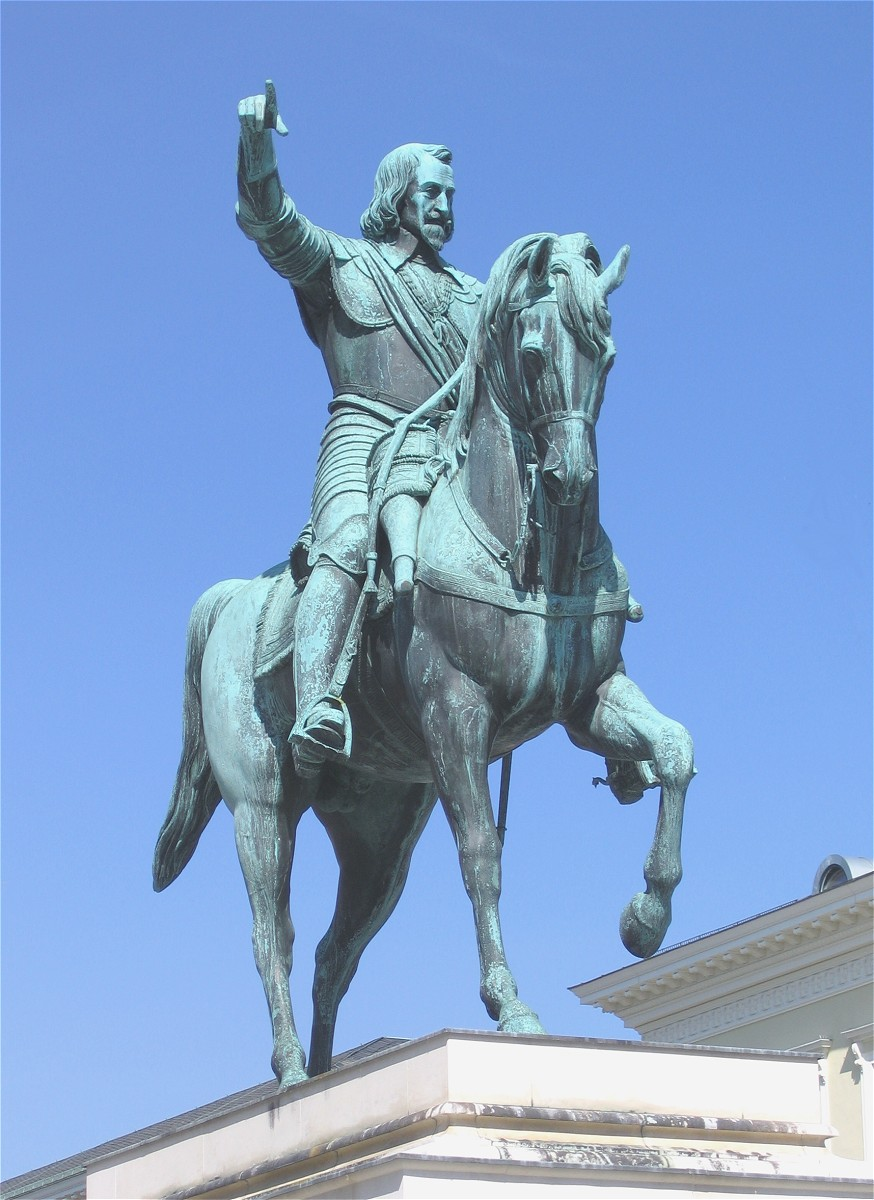
Elector Maximilian I in Munich

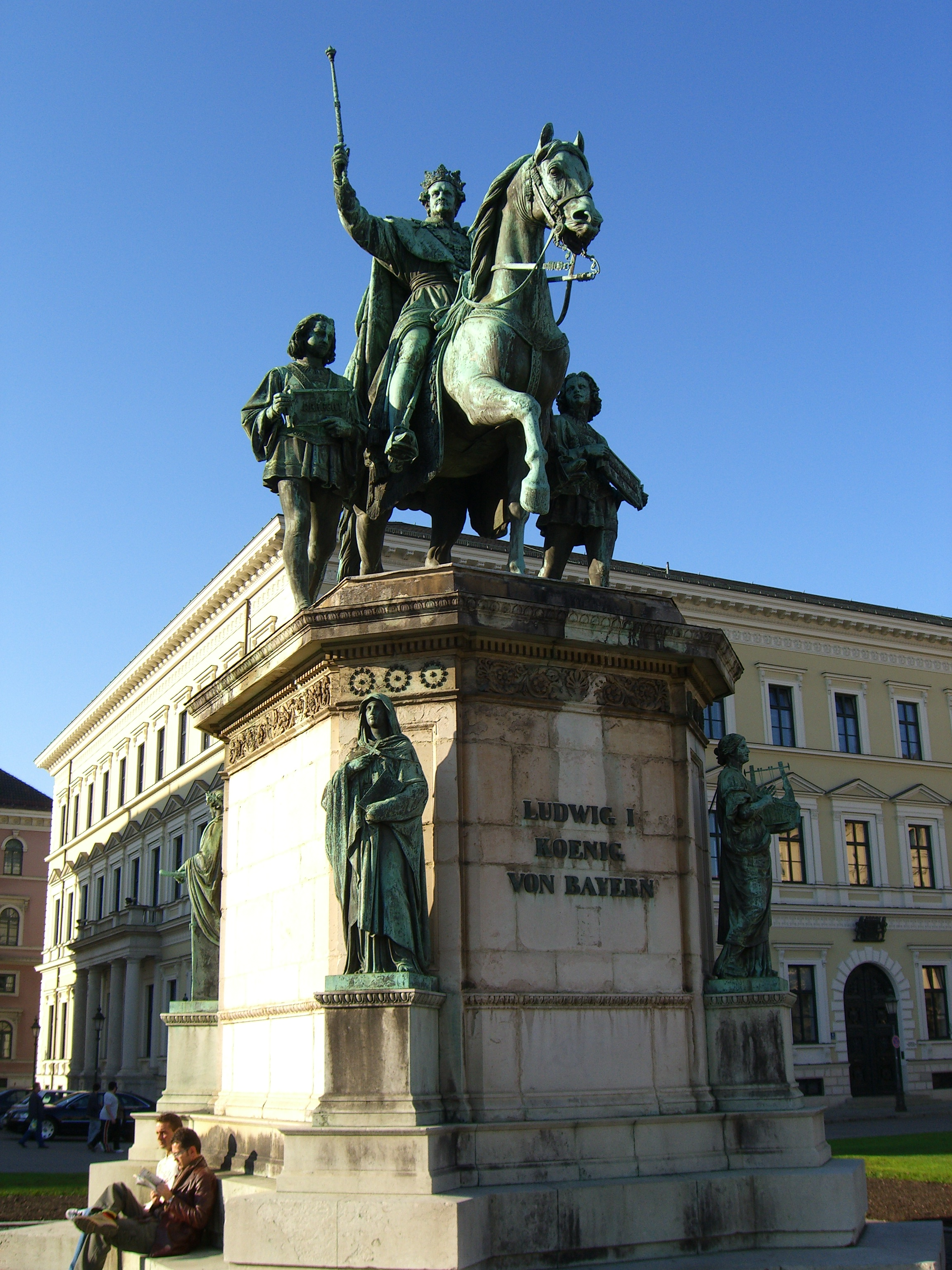
King Ludwig I in Munich

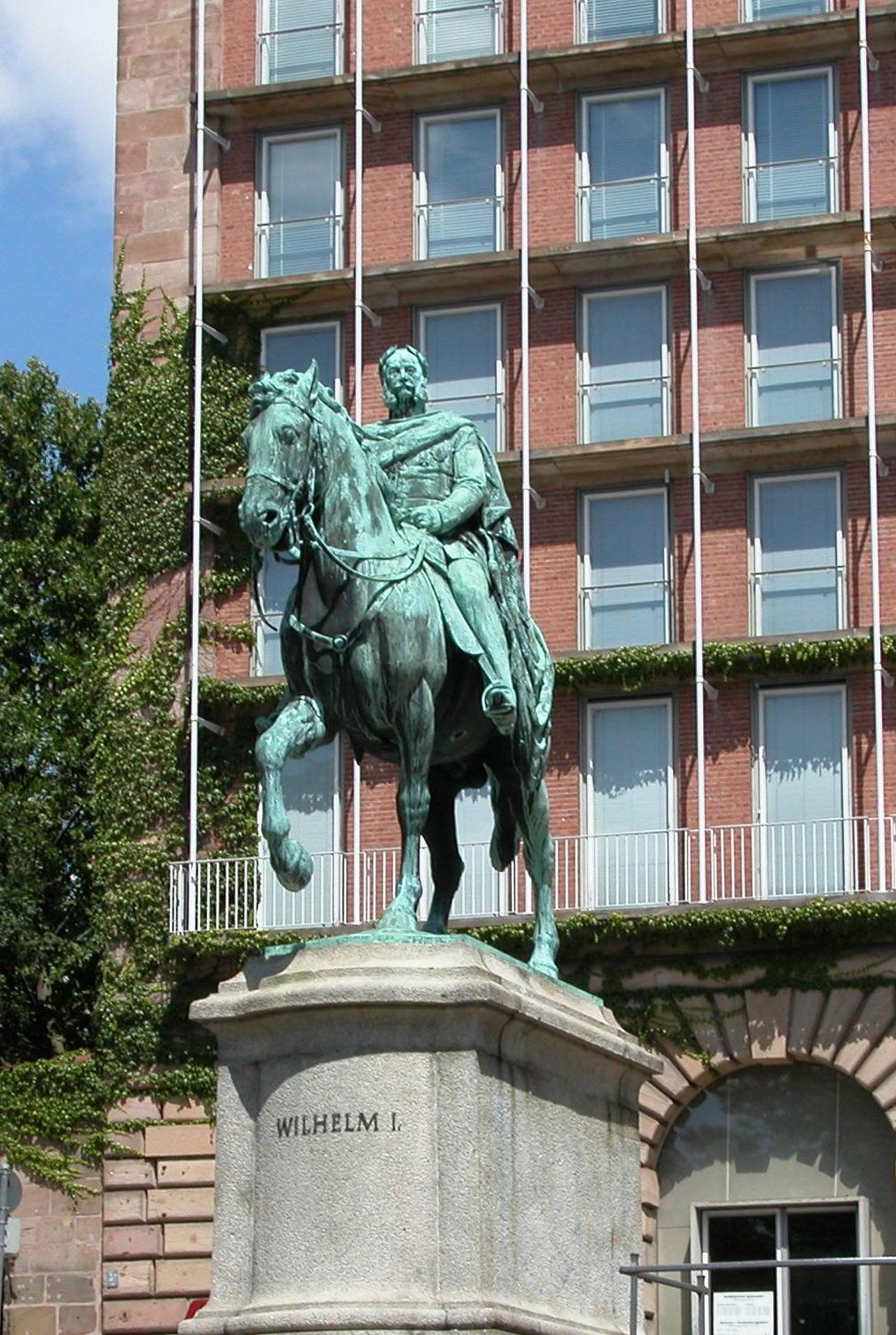
Emperor Wilhelm I in Nuremberg

== Osnabrück ==
- Emperor Wilhelm I by Adolf Heer at the Goetheplatz, 1899.

== Saarbrücken ==
- Emperor Wilhelm I close to the Alte Brücke (Old Bridge), destroyed after 1945.
- Den Gefallenen Soldaten monument.

== Sankt Andreasberg ==
- Emperor Wilhelm I by Karl Harzig, 1906.

== Schwerin ==
- Grand Duke Friedrich Franz II by Ludwig Brunow close to Schlossgarten, 1893.
- The Obotrite Prince Niklot at the Schwerin Castle (sculptor, Christian Genschow)
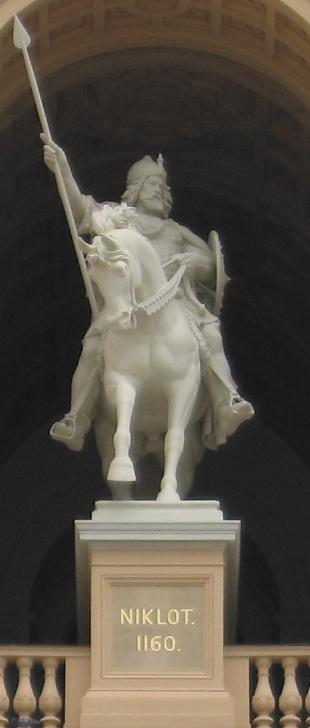
The Obotrite Prince Niklot in Schwerin Castle

== Solingen ==
- Archbishop Engelbert II by Paul Wynand in Schloss Burg, 1925.
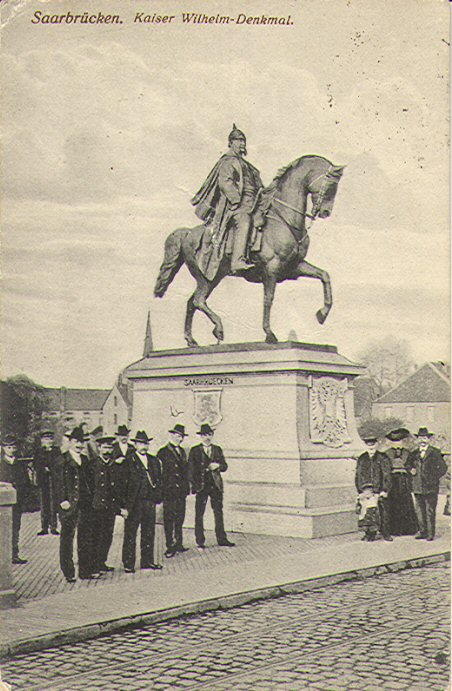
Emperor Wilhelm I in Saarbrücken

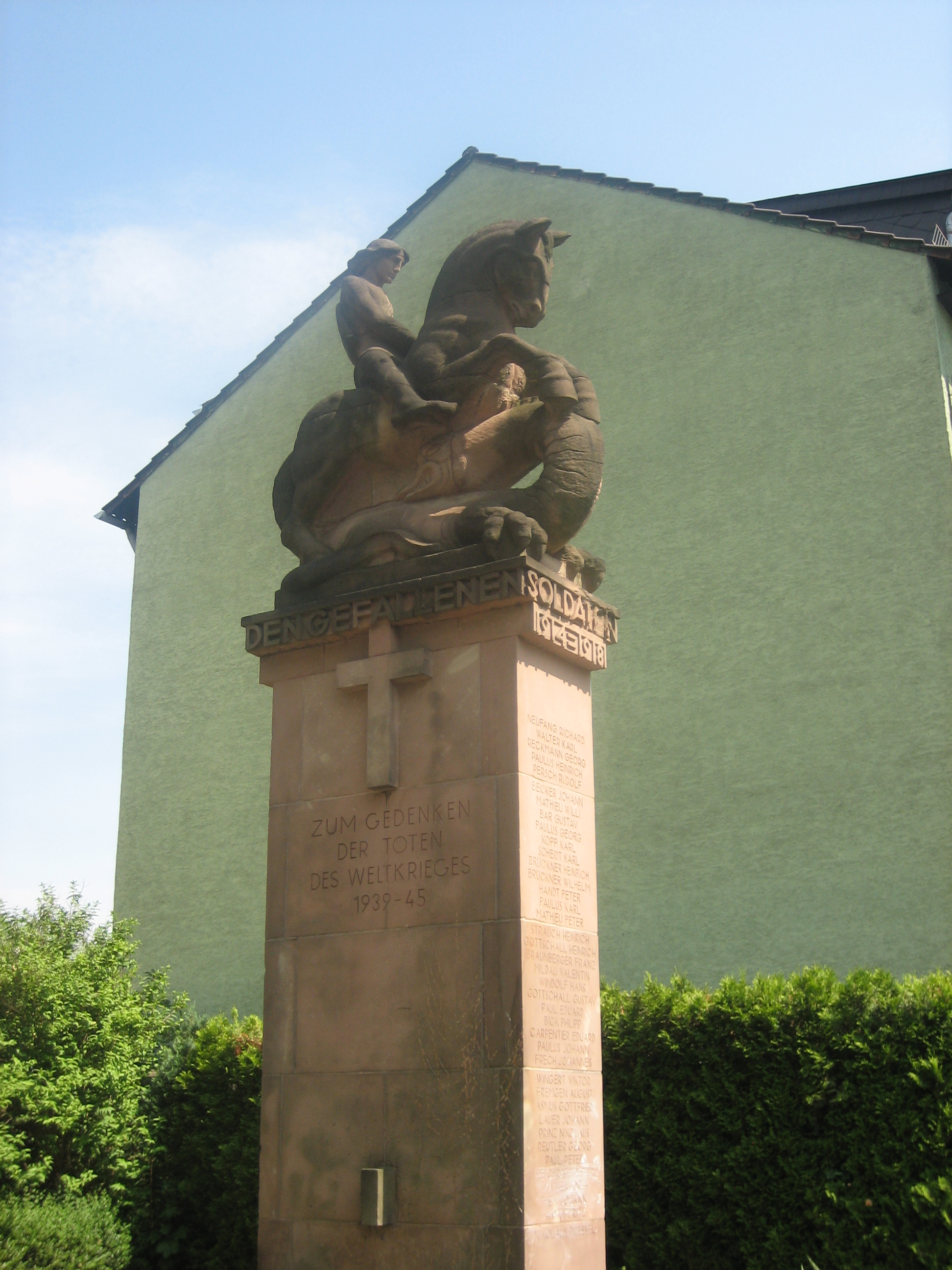
Den Gefallenen Soldaten in Saarbrücken

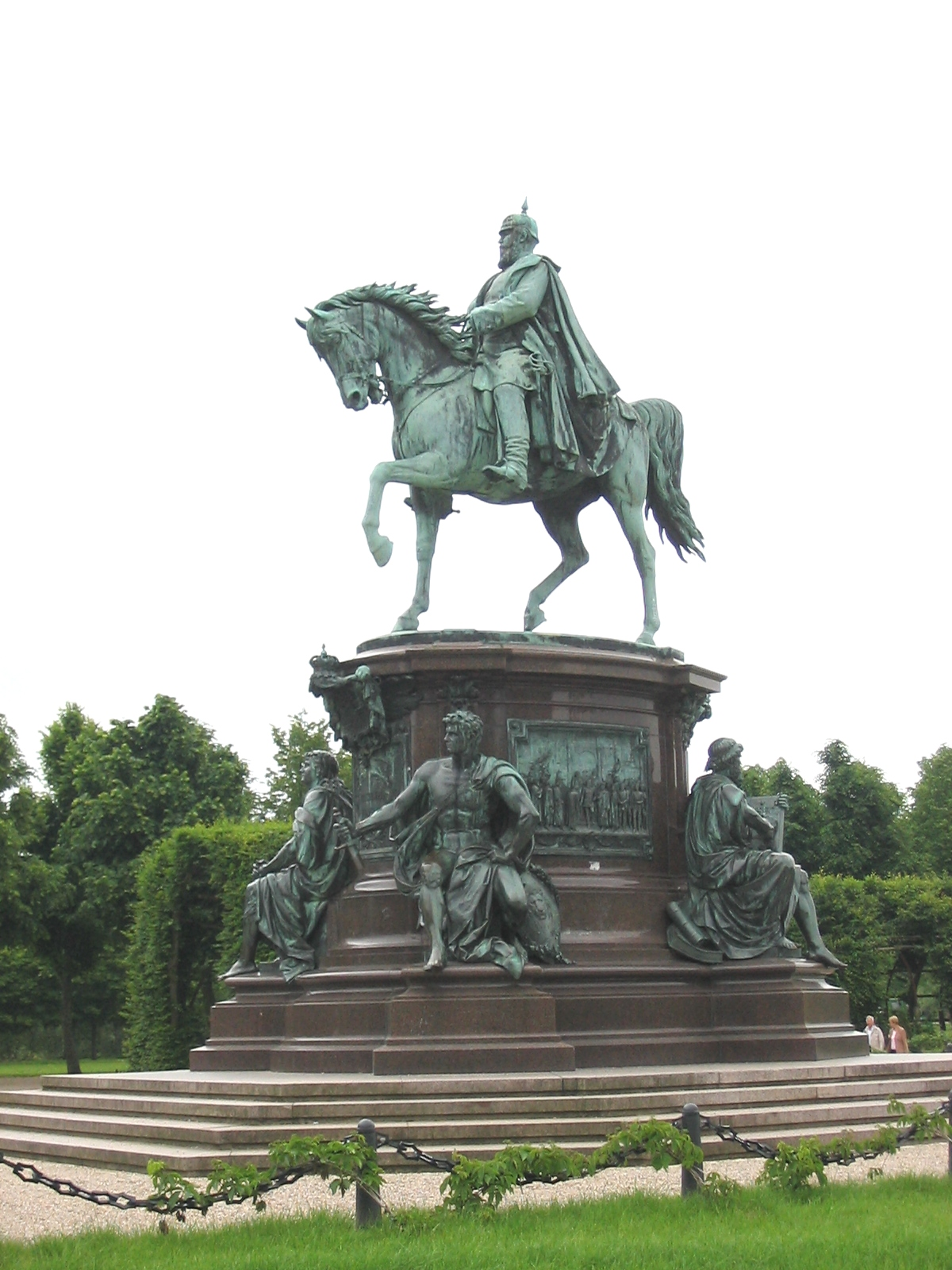
Grand Duke Friedrich Franz II in Schwerin

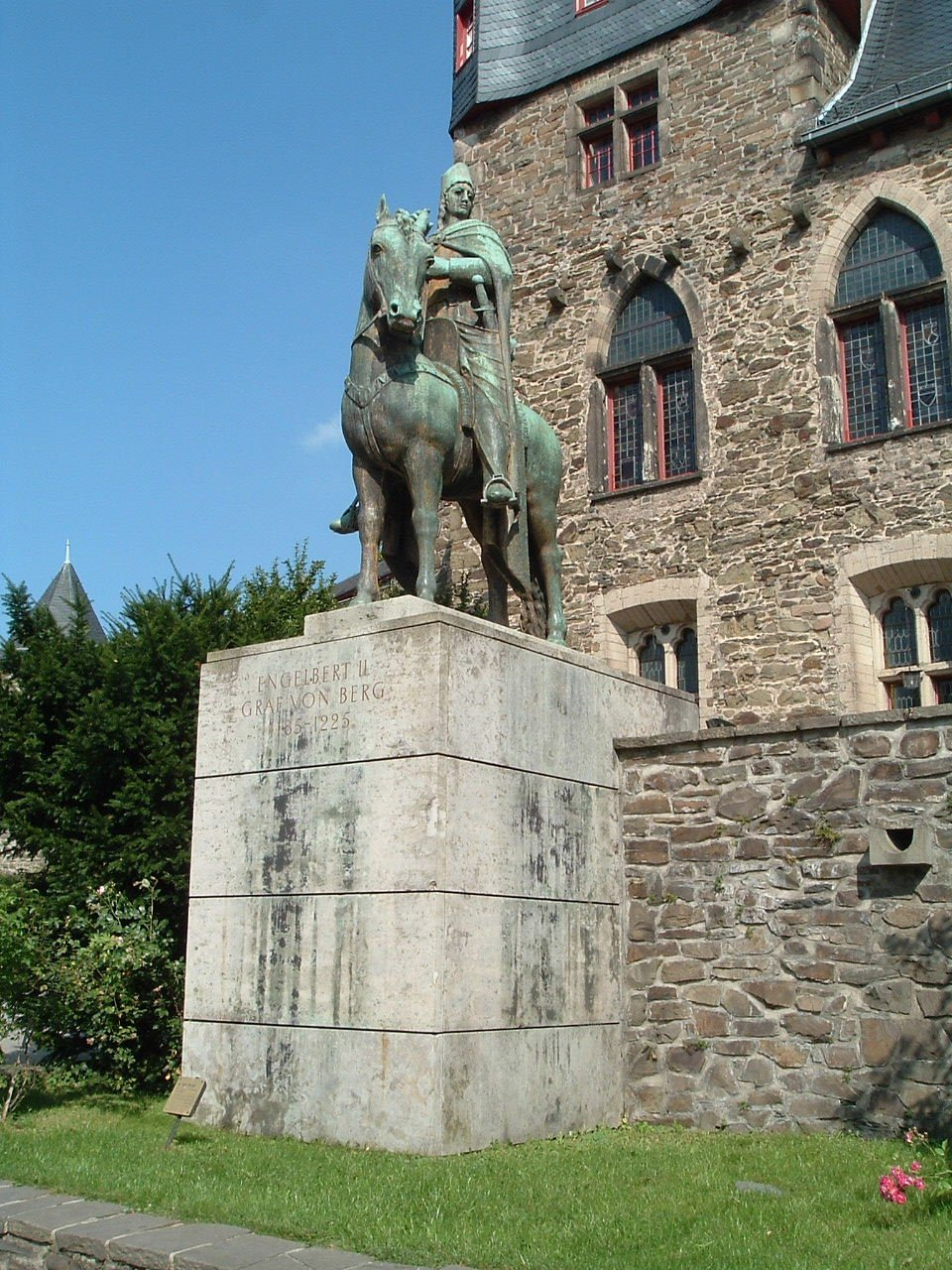
Archbishop Engelbert II in Solingen

== Stuttgart ==
- Emperor Wilhelm I by Wilhelm von Rümann at the Karlsplatz, 1898.
- King Wilhelm I by Ludwig von Hofer in the Konrad-Adenauer-Straße.
- Duke Eberhard I by Ludwig von Hofer in Altes Schloss, 1859.

== Waldheim ==
- Emperor Wilhelm I by Gustav Eberlein.

== Weimar ==
- Grand Duke Karl August by Adolf von Donndorf, 1867-1875.

== Weißenfels ==
- Emperor Wilhelm I by Ernst Wenck.

== Wriezen ==
- Emperor Wilhelm I close to Rathaus, destroyed after 1945.

== Überlingen ==
- Martin Walser (Reiter über den Bodensee) by Peter Lenk.
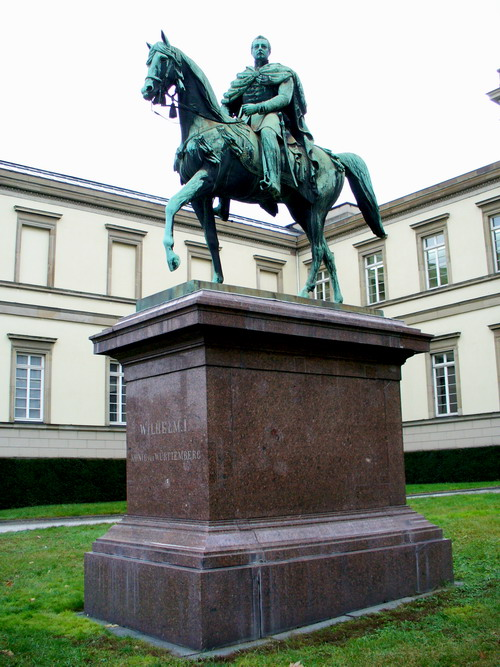
King Wilhelm I in Stuttgart

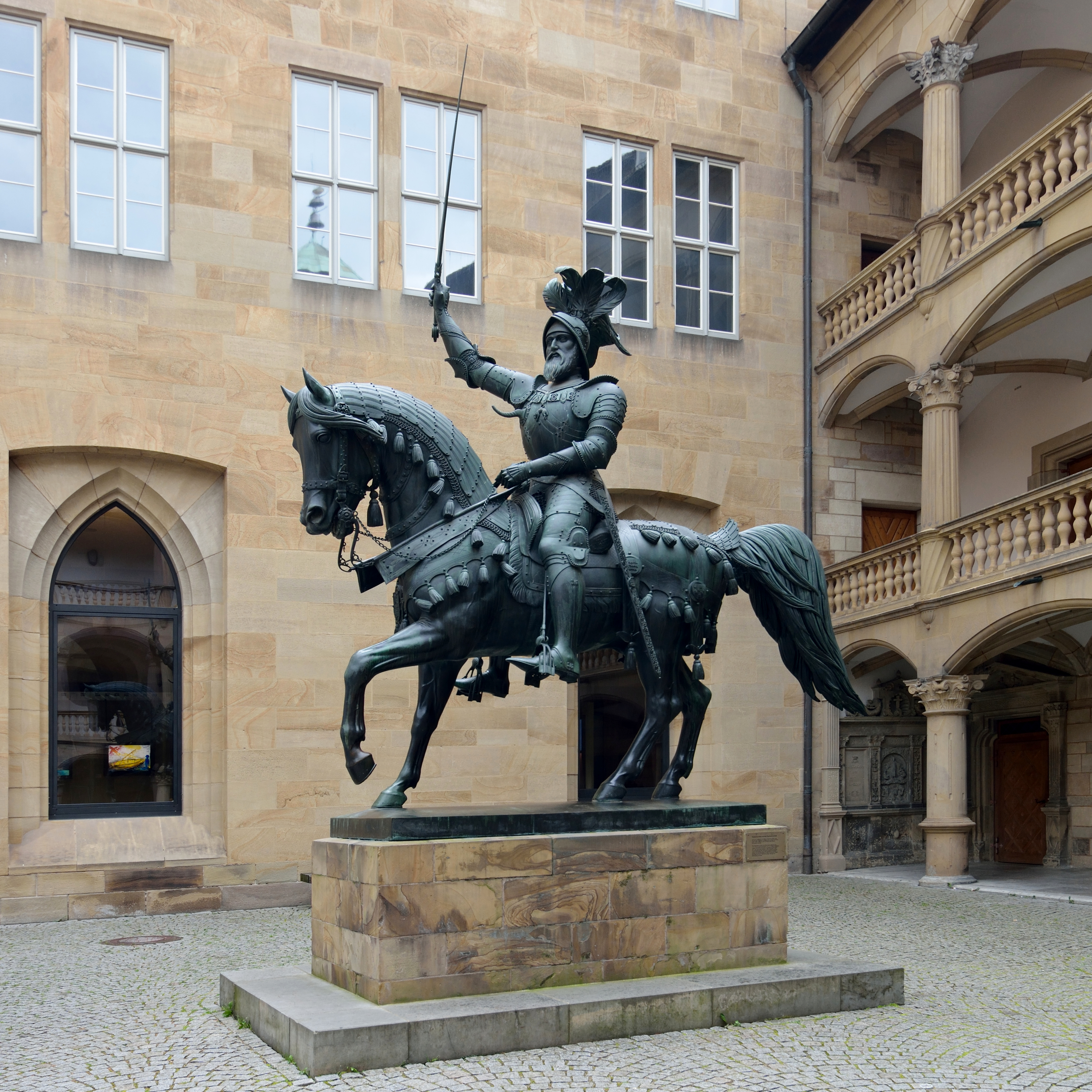
Duke Eberhard I in Stuttgart

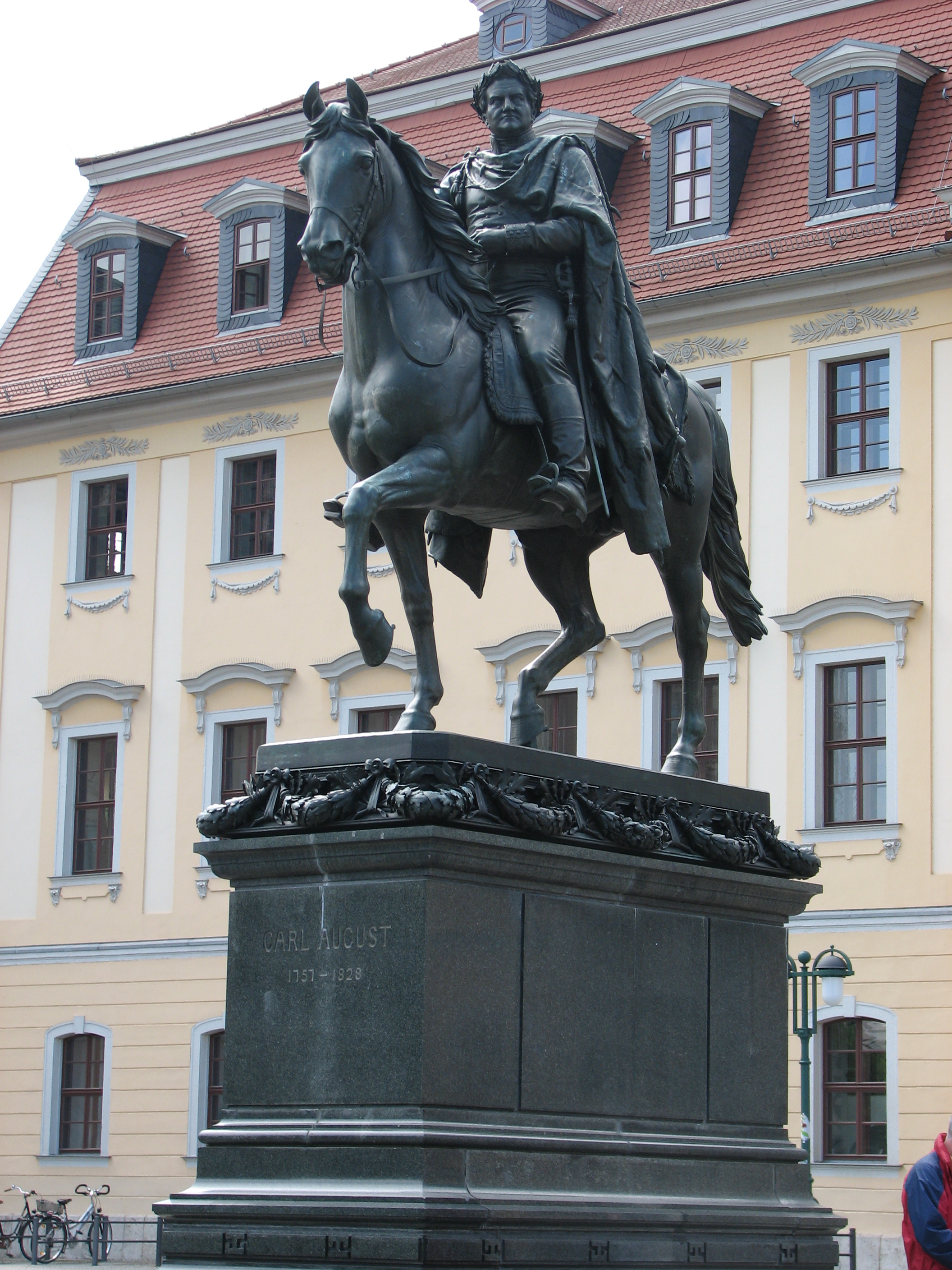
Grand Duke Karl August in Weimar

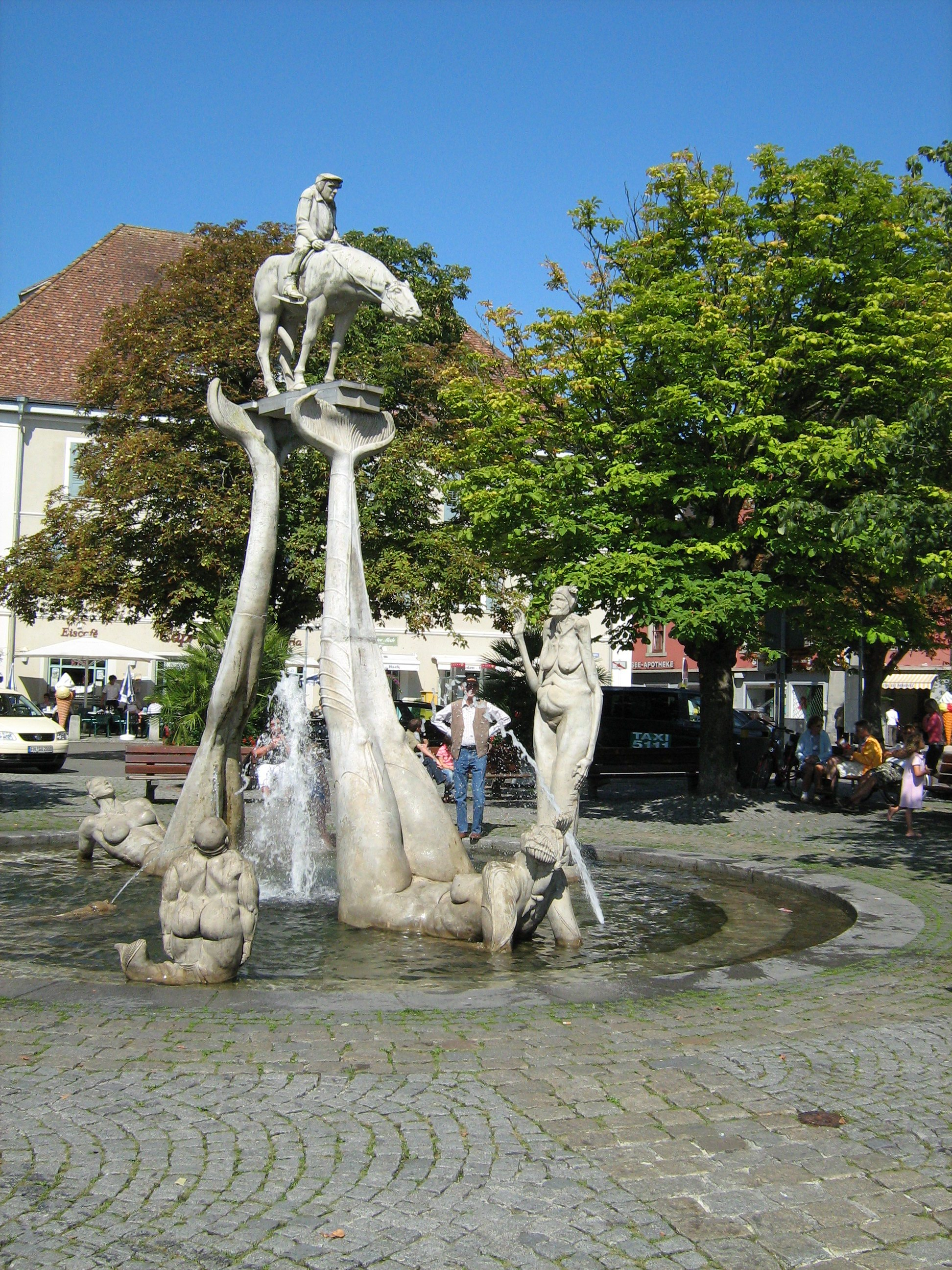
Reiter über den Bodensee in Überlingen

== Wuppertal ==
- Emperor Wilhelm I by Gustav Eberlein in Elberfeld, 1893.
- Emperor Wilhelm II on elevation of the Intercity-Hotels.
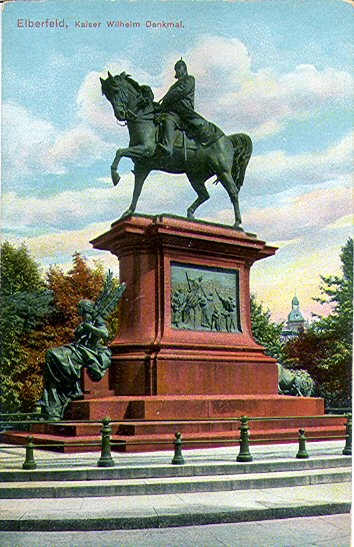
Emperor Wilhelm I in Wuppertal
