= Amazone zu Pferde =

Amazone zu Pferde may refer to:

- Amazone zu Pferde (Kiss), a sculpture by August Kiss
- Amazone zu Pferde (Tuaillon), a sculpture by Louis Tuaillon
