= Hercules and the Erymanthian Boar =

Sculpture by Louis Tuaillon in Berlin, Germany

- Herkules und der erymantische Eber (German)
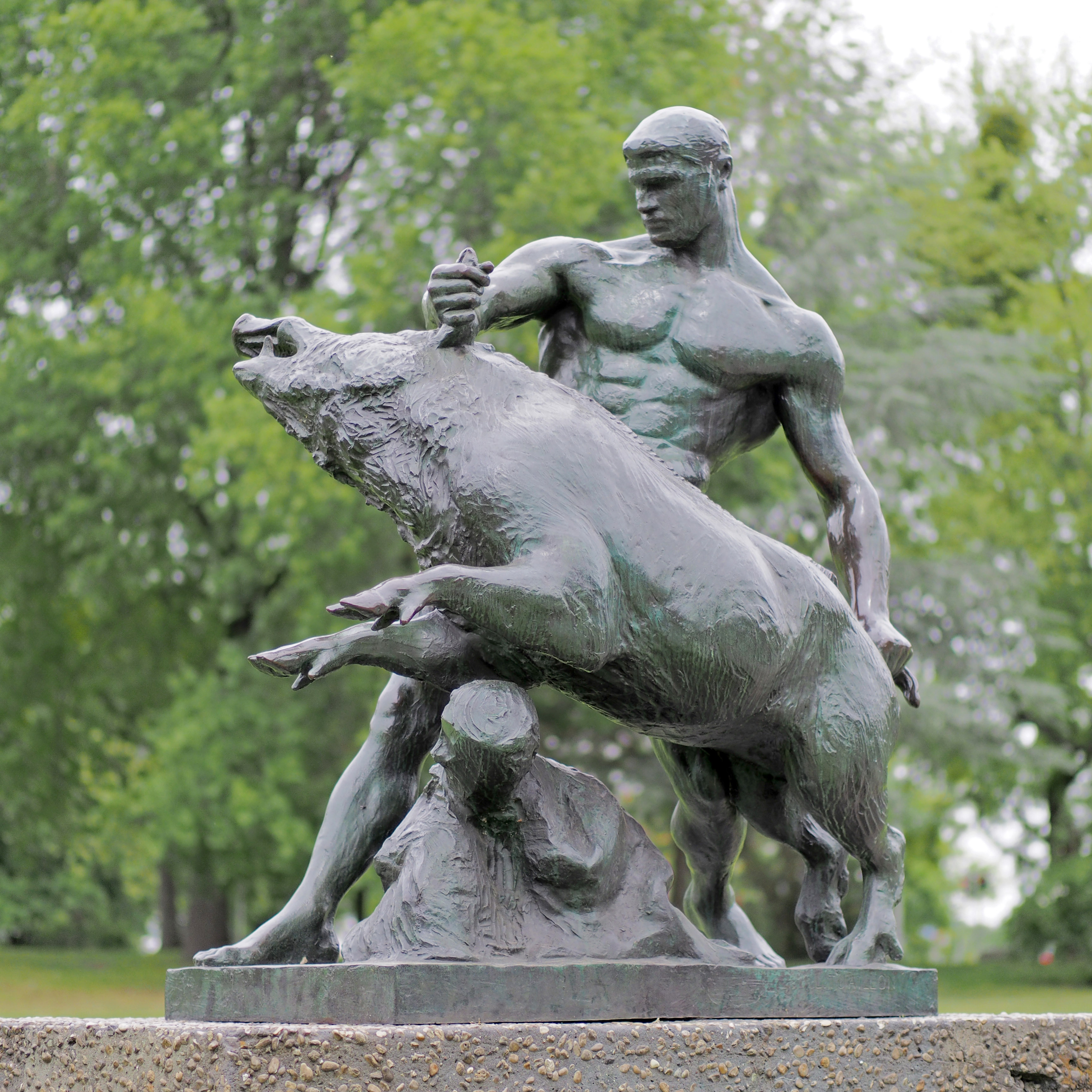
- The sculpture in 2015
- Artist: Louis Tuaillon
- Type: Sculpture
- Location: Berlin, Germany; 52°30′16″N 13°21′09″E

Hercules and the Erymanthian Boar is an outdoor sculpture by Louis Tuaillon, located at Lützowplatz in Berlin-Tiergarten, Germany. It represents Hercules fighting the Erymanthian Boar, one of his Twelve Labours.

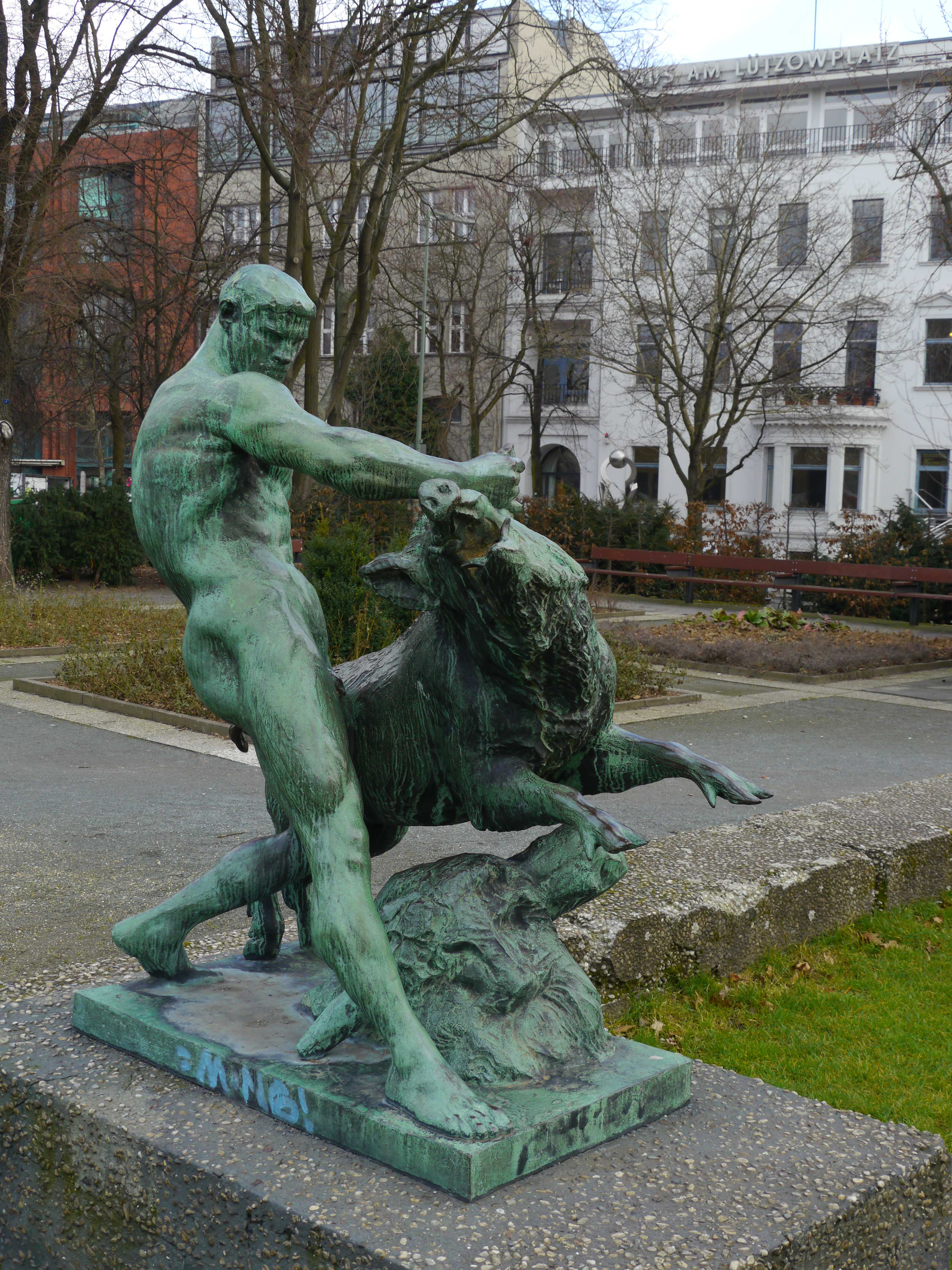
The statue from another perspective
