= Bamberg Horseman =

Sculpture in Bamberg Cathedral in Germany

Coordinates: 49°53′27″N 10°52′58″E

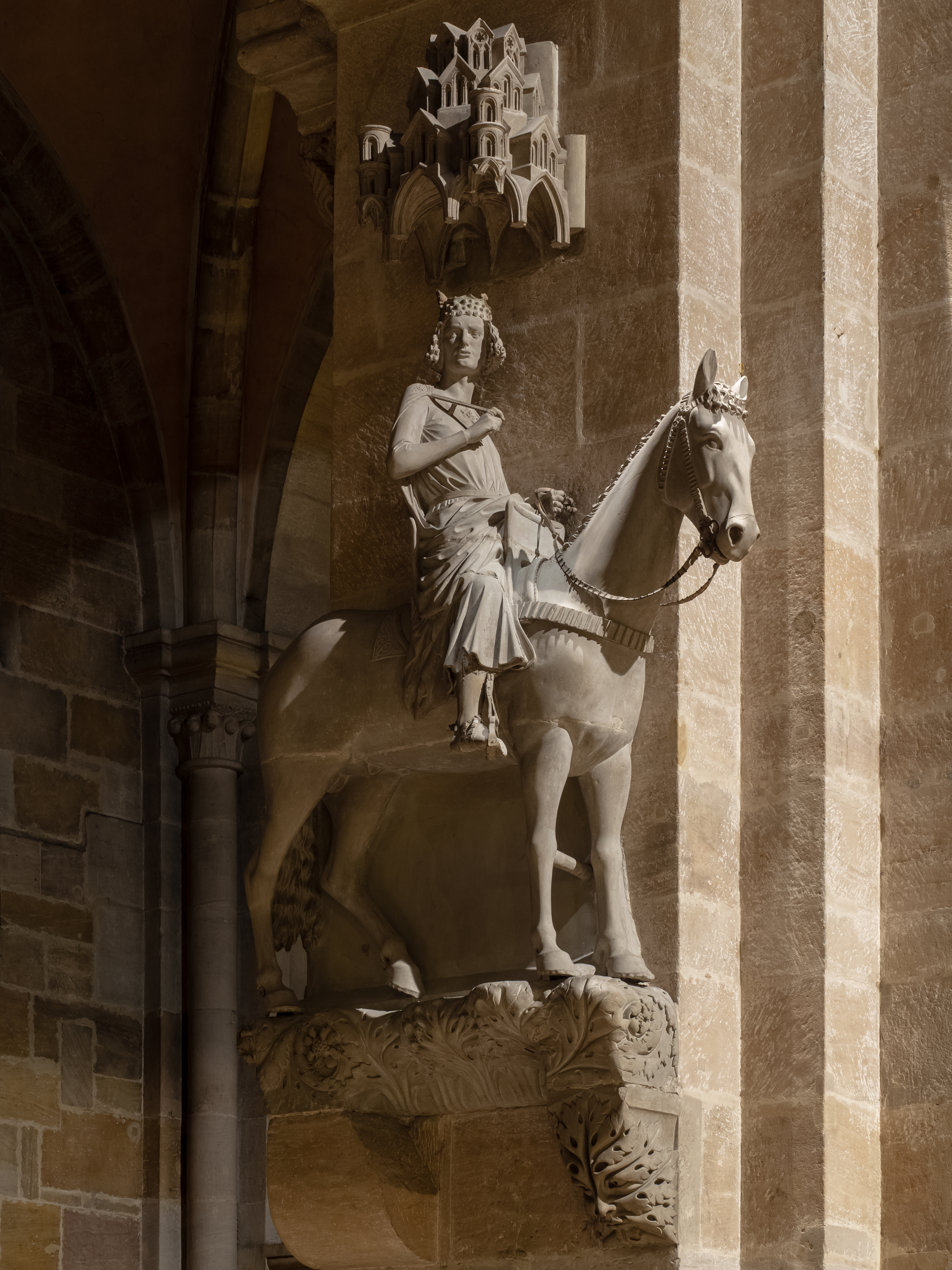
Bamberger Reiter

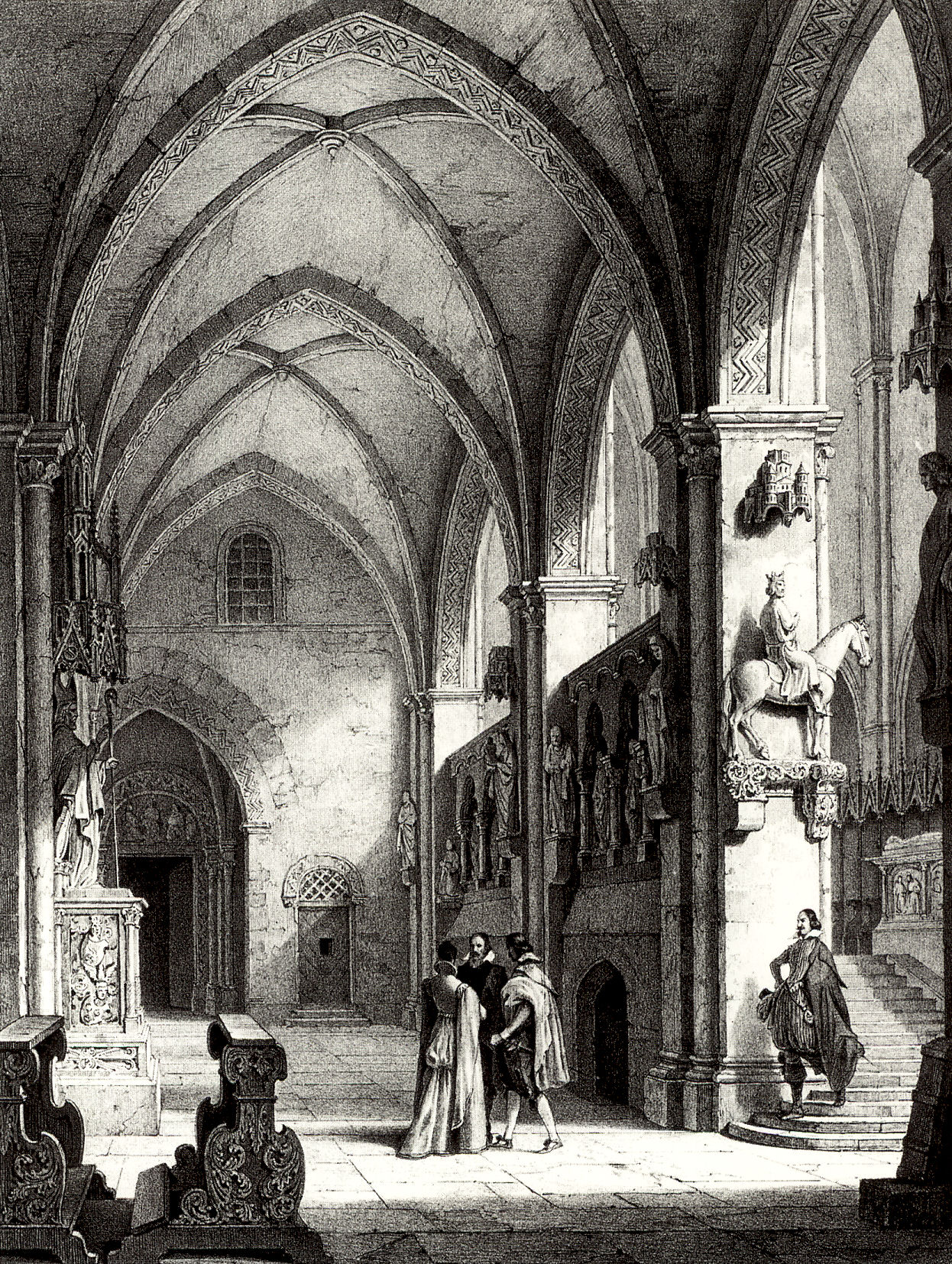
Bamberg Cathedral, 1820

The Bamberg Horseman (German: Der Bamberger Reiter) is an early 13th-century stone equestrian statue by an anonymous medieval sculptor in the cathedral of Bamberg, Germany. It is the first of this kind since antiquity.

== Description ==
Dating probably from the time before the consecration of the cathedral's new building in 1237, but after 1225, it is located on a console at the north pillar of the St. George choir. It is not known whether this is the intended position of the statue, although the base appears to be original and the structure of the base would seem to dissuade moving.

== Interpretation ==
Being located in a church and showing a crowned yet unarmed man, it is believed that it represents a specific king, perhaps one who was a saint. A candidate is Emperor Henry II (973-1024) who is buried in the cathedral along with Pope Clement II, but he would likely have been depicted with Imperial Regalia. Another possibility is his brother-in-law, king Stephen I of Hungary (975-1038) who stops his horse and looks towards the tomb of Henry. Another theory favours Emperor Frederick II, the Holy Roman Emperor at the time, who financed much of the rebuilding of the cathedral. Yet another theory, supported by Hannes Möhring of the University of Bayreuth, holds that the figure represents the Messiah according to the Book of Revelation (19:11–16). In 2014, an inventory of the statues in the cathedral gave rise to the theory that a project for a large sculptural screen for the eastern choir was begun and abandoned after only a few statues had been completed; two other unusual sculptures in the church fit into this proposal. According to the reconstruction, the horseman was supposed to be one of the Three Wise Men in a scene depicting the birth of Jesus, his upturned gaze following the Star of Bethlehem.

It is considered the first monumental equestrian statue since classical antiquity, and also one of the first to depict a horse shoe. Beneath the horse's front hooves is one of the many sculptural representations of the Green Man. Kathleen Basford, in her study of these figures, calls this Green Man the "dark counterpart" of the horseman.

Stefan George wrote a poem about the horseman. His work influenced Claus Schenk Graf von Stauffenberg, the would-be assassin of Hitler who was a member of the cavalry unit Bamberger Reiter- und Kavallerieregiment 17 (17th Cavalry Regiment).

== See also ==
- List of equestrian statues in Germany
