= Richard Wagner Monument =

Monument in Berlin

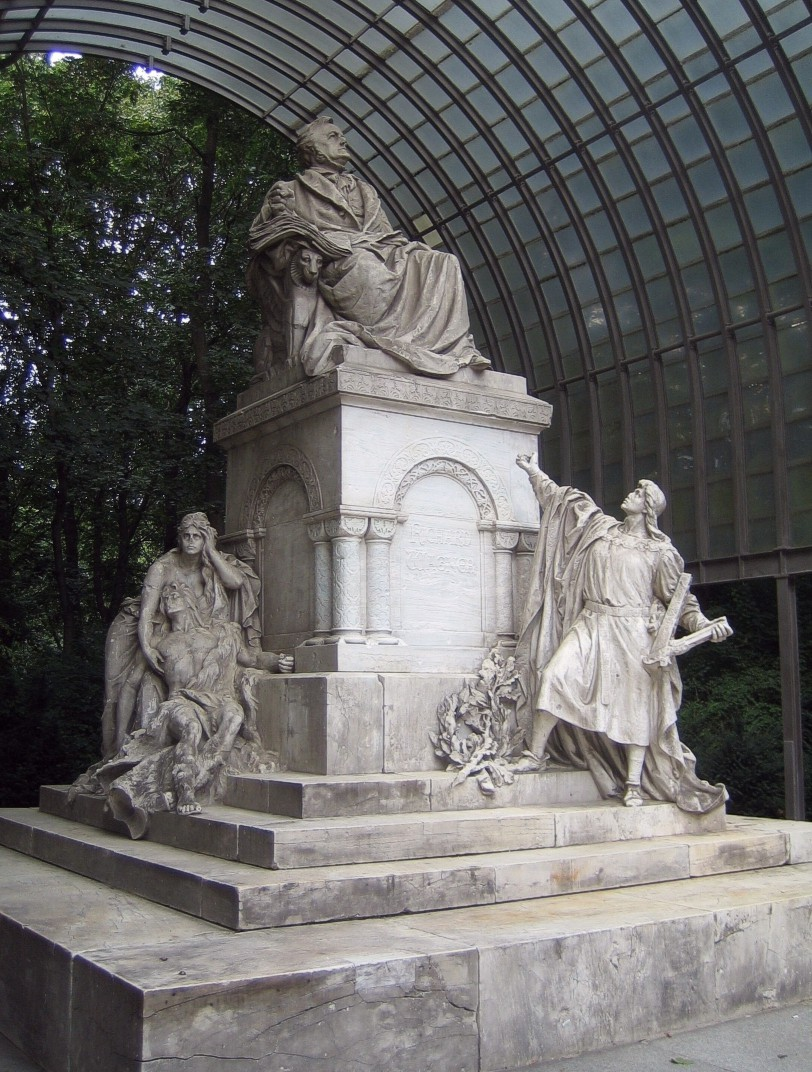
- The monument in 2007
- Location: Berlin, Germany; 52°30′36″N 13°21′43″E

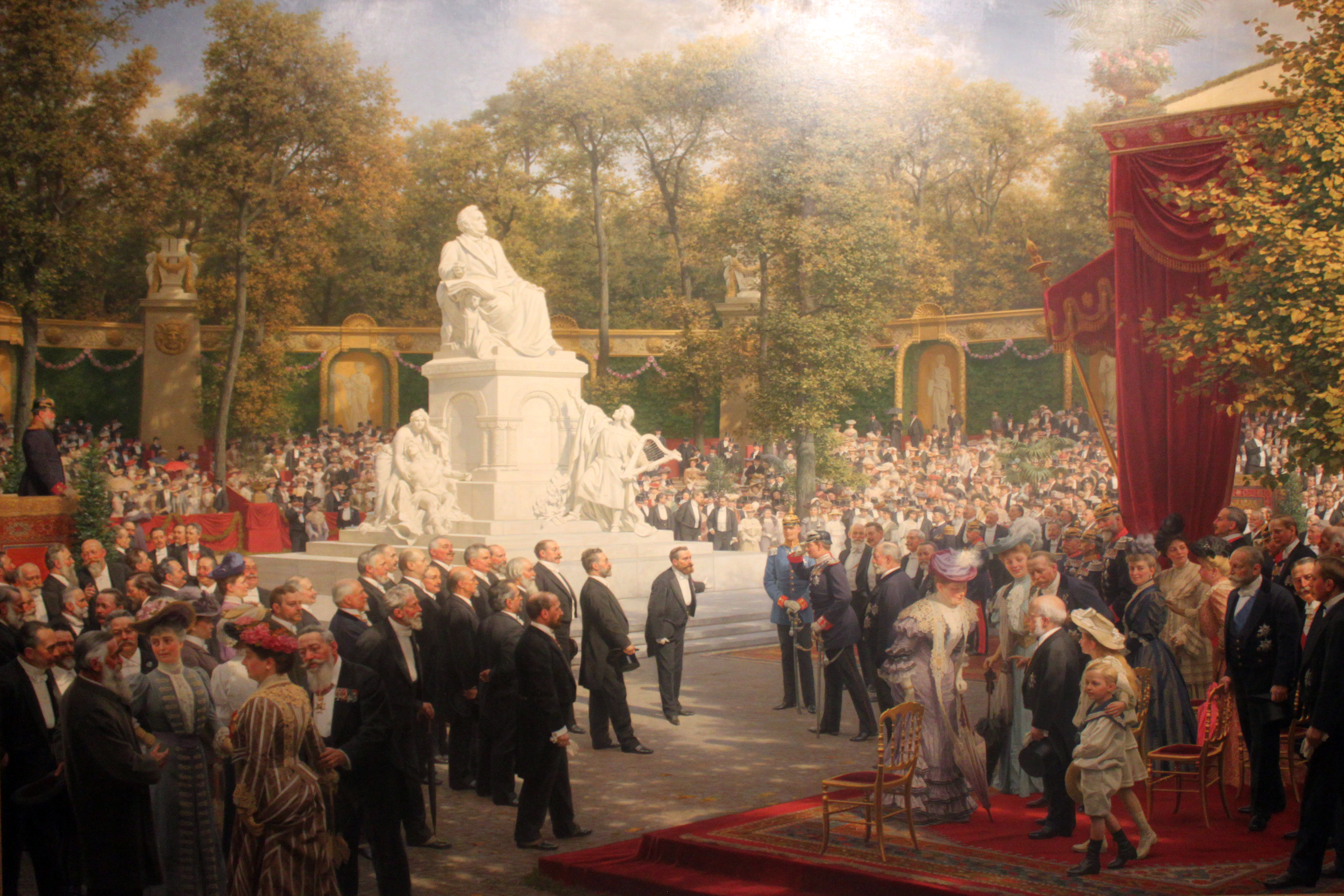
Unveiling of the Richard Wagner Monument in the Tiergarten (1908), by Anton von Werner.

The Richard Wagner Monument (German: Richard-Wagner-Denkmal) is a memorial sculpture of Richard Wagner by Gustav Eberlein, located in Tiergarten in Berlin, Germany. It was created during 1901–1903 and is installed along Tiergartenstraße across from the Indian Embassy. It depicts Wagner in a seated pose and is covered by a roof.
