= Lützowplatz =

Square in Berlin, Germany

Coordinates: 52.5047°N 13.3524°E

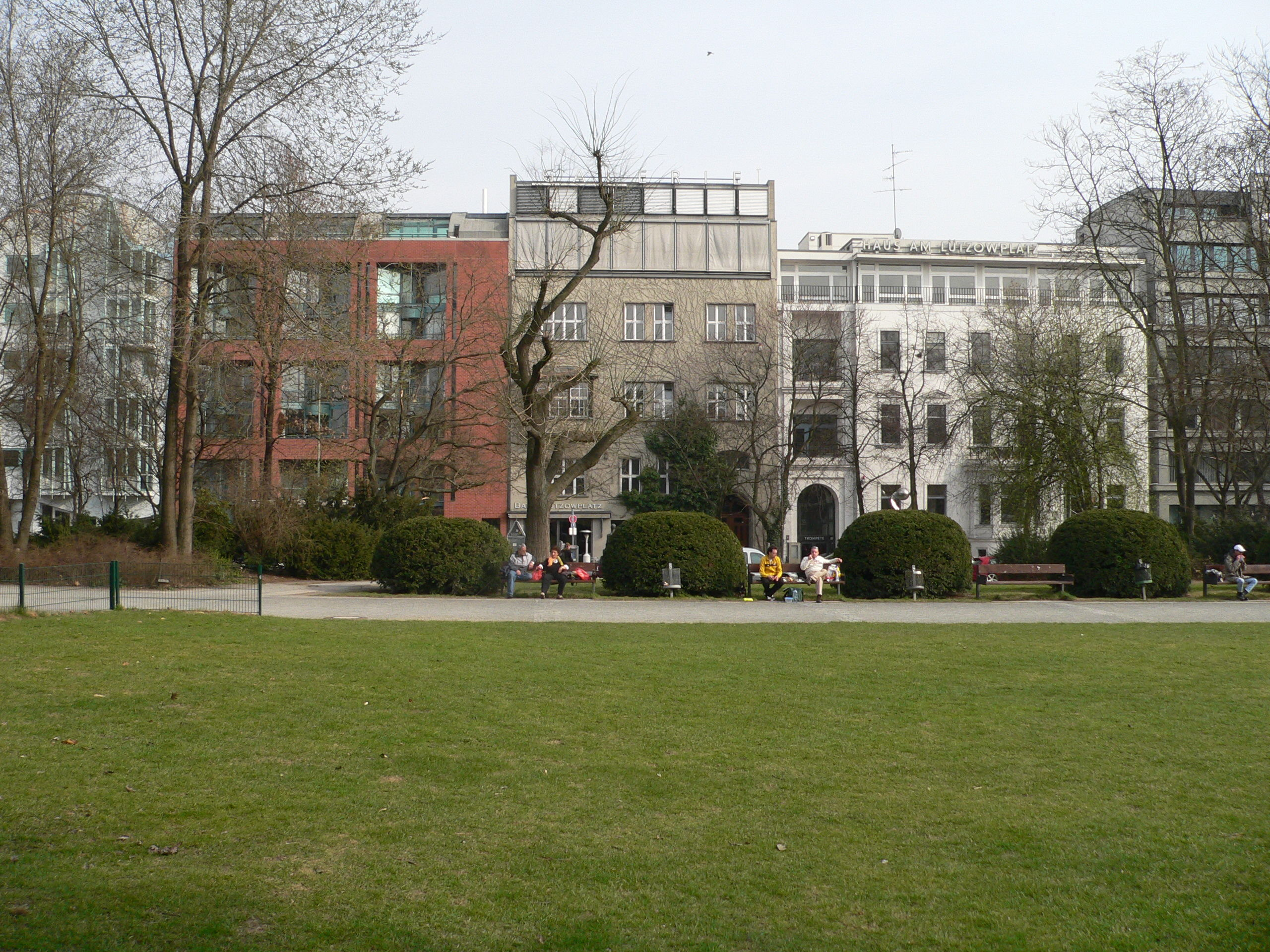
Lützowplatz in 2011

Lützowplatz is a public, inner-city area with relatively high traffic in Berlin's Tiergarten district of Mitte.

== Sculptures ==
- 3-X-90 in Deutschland (1990) by Ernest Altés (Ates)
- Hercules and the Erymanthian Boar (1904) by Louis Tuaillon
- Stehende und liegende Gruppe (1980/85) by Sabina Grzimek
