= Louis Tuaillon =

German sculptor

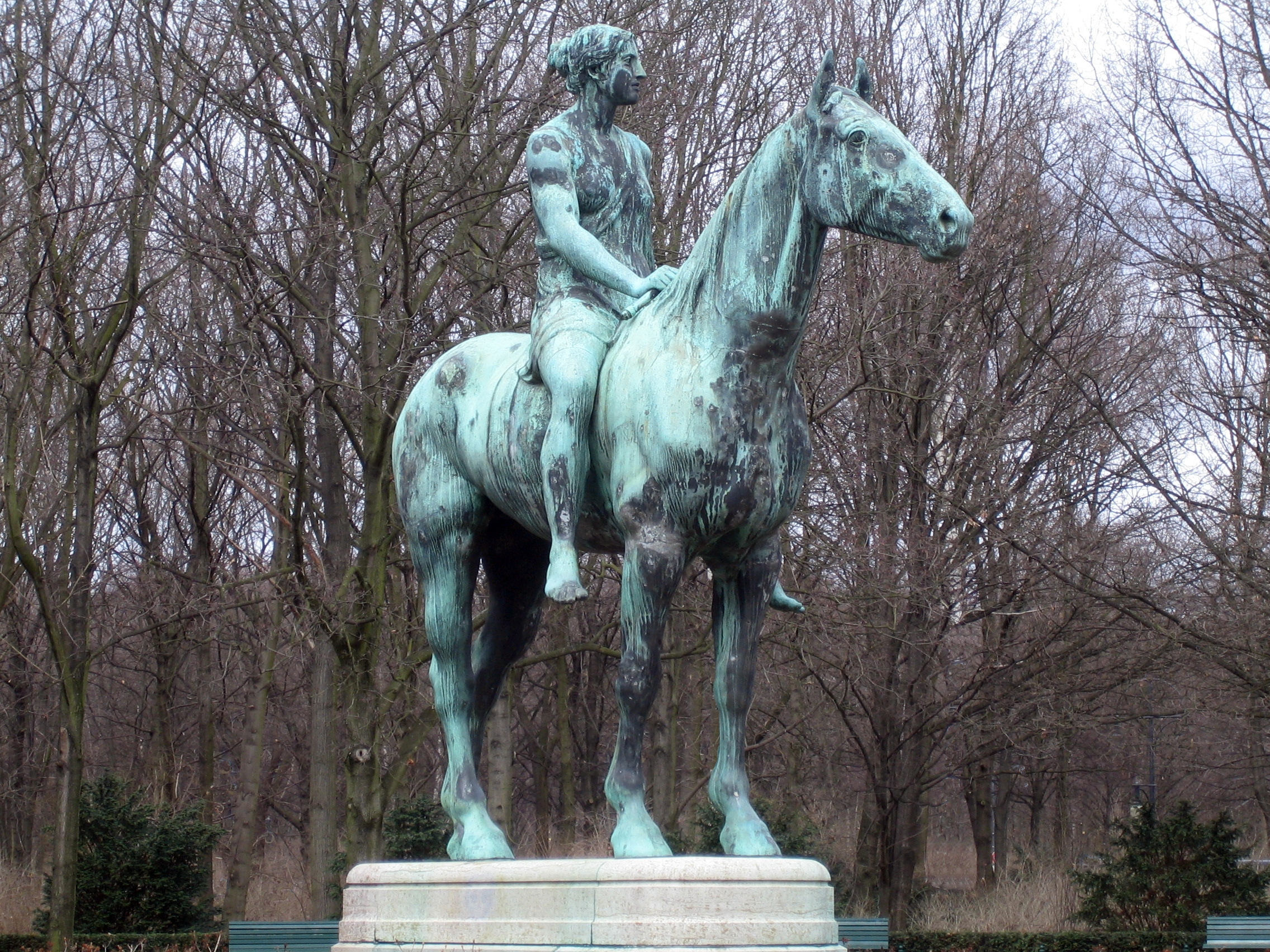
Mounted Amazon, 1895 (Berlin Tiergarten)

Louis Tuaillon (Berlin, 7 September 1862 – Berlin, 21 February 1919) was a Prussian sculptor. From 1879 to 1881, he attended the Hochschule für Bildende Künste in Berlin, then worked in the studio of Reinhold Begas. In Vienna, he spent two years in the studio of Rudolf Weyr. He then spent the years 1885 to 1903 in Rome. From 1906, Tuaillon was once again in Berlin, as Professor in the academy.

His heroic nudes on classical themes may be seen in public parks in Berlin, Bremen, Mecklenburg, Barnim, Bad Freienwalde and at Schloss Merseburg.

== Works ==
- Hercules and the Erymanthian Boar
