= Gustav Eberlein =

German sculptor

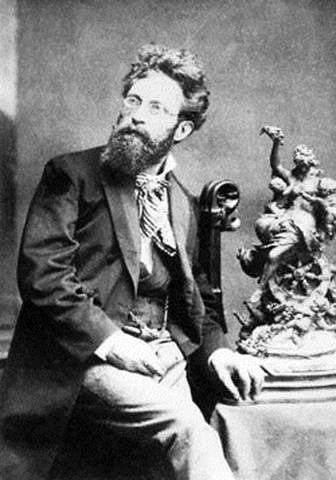
Gustav Eberlein (before 1900)

Gustav Heinrich Eberlein (14 July 1847, Spiekershausen (near Staufenberg) - 5 February 1926, Berlin) was a German sculptor, painter and writer.

== Life ==
He was the son of a border guard. At the age of eight, his family moved to Hannoversch Münden, which would be his home for the remainder of his life, despite many years spent elsewhere. His parents lacked the money to provide him with formal artistic training, so he obtained instruction wherever possible, especially from the local goldsmith. In 1866, thanks to the patronage of a pastor who had recognized his talents, he was able to attend the Academy of Fine Arts in Nuremberg. In 1869, he went to Berlin on a scholarship. Three years later, another scholarship enabled him to study in Rome.

Upon his return to Berlin, he received significant support from Martin Gropius. Despite growing success, the next decade was difficult. His three-year-old son died in 1882, then his mother in 1888. This was followed by a divorce in 1891. A year later, he married the Countess Maria von Hertzberg, an aspiring young artist, and was appointed a Professor at the Prussian Academy of Arts the year after that.

In 1900, he came out in strong opposition to the "Lex Heinze" (which, among other things, banned the display of "immoral" art works). That same year, all but a few of his figures were removed from display at the Great Berlin Exhibition, not only because of the law but also, probably, because of his support for French and Belgian sculptors (such as Rodin and Meunier). In fact, as tensions between Germany and its western neighbors grew, Eberlein's outspoken advocacy of peace and disarmament caused him to lose his public commissions.

=== Later career ===
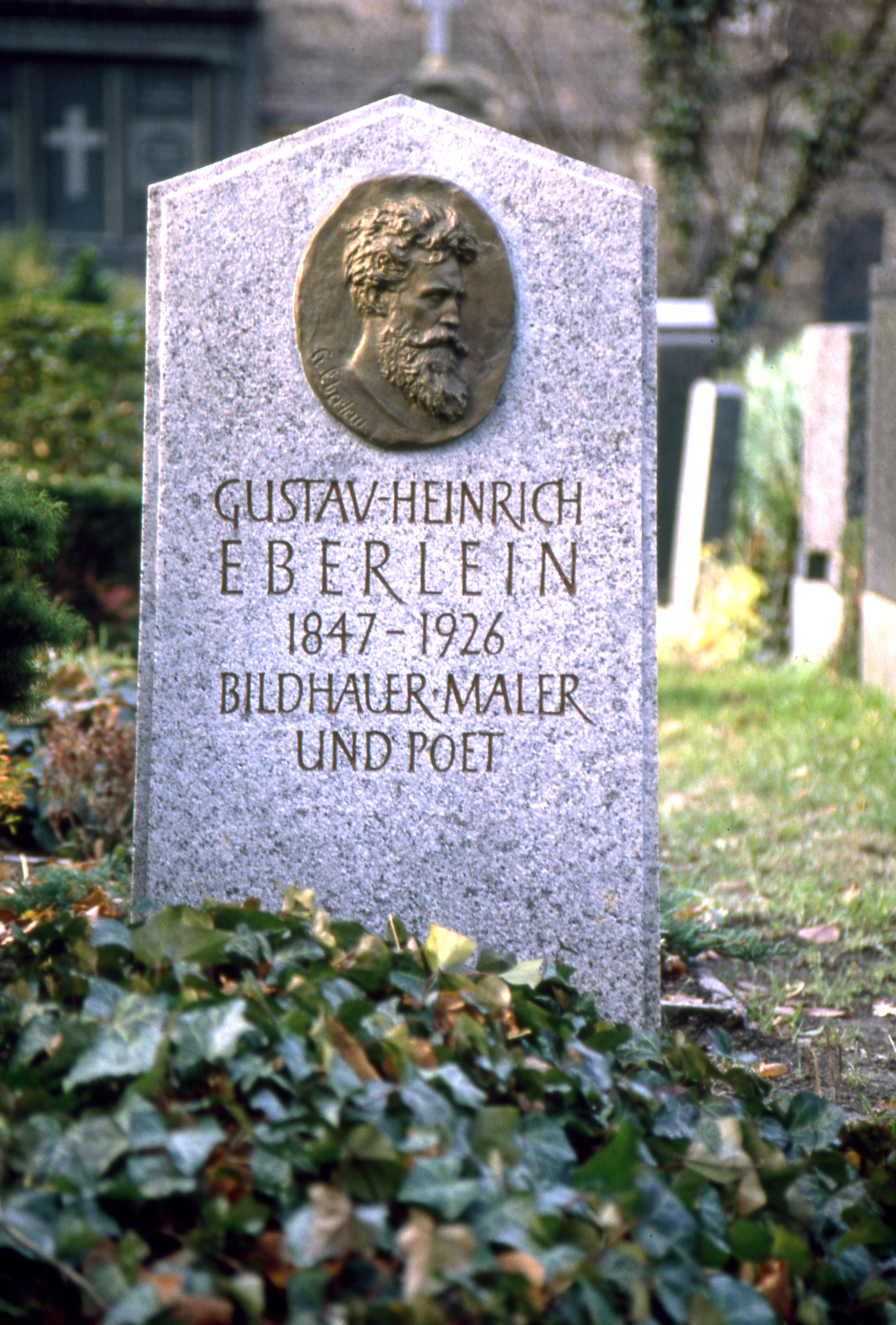
Tomb at Alter St.-Matthäus-Kirchhof

He was able to find work elsewhere, notably in South America, but his finances never recovered and he was divorced for a second time in 1912. The following year, he auctioned off most of his possessions in anticipation of emigrating, but those plans were put off because of World War I. He received some orders during the war and created a small museum at his studios in Berlin but, after the war, criticism was renewed; especially for his creating a statue of Karl Marx at the same time he was doing one of the former Kaiser. He was especially well known for his small figures and portrait sculpture and produced over 900 works. The majority of his larger bronze monuments were melted down during World War II. Most of his 300 original plaster models were disposed of by the city of Münden after his death. In 1962, work related to a construction project revealed approximately 80 figures and 11 paintings that were preserved and restored between 1983 and 1989. Many are now in the collection of the Deutsches Historisches Museum, Berlin.

He was able to avert destitution only by adopting his housemaid as his daughter, ensuring that he would be cared for by her family. By the time of his death, he was nearly forgotten. He was buried at the Alter St.-Matthäus-Kirchhof in Berlin.

== Selected major works ==
- Altona, Germany - The Peace
- Berlin Tiergarten - Richard Wagner and Albert Lortzing monuments.
- Berlin Tiergarten - Figures for the Siegesallee (Victory Avenue) project of Wilhelm II. He did two groups:

Group 26; consisting of Frederick I of Prussia as the central figure, flanked by Andreas Schlüter and Eberhard von Danckelmann.
Group 30; with Frederick William III of Prussia as the central figure, flanked by Gebhard Leberecht von Blücher and Heinrich Friedrich Karl vom und zum Stein.

- Buenos Aires - "Monument to General José de San Martín and the Armies of Independence"; side figures.
- Hannoversch Münden - Germania Statue; with many signed copies forming a part of various war memorials throughout Germany. (The exact number is unknown because some were lost or destroyed). This was the result of an aggressive advertising campaign by the foundry, which included the statue in its catalog.
- Montevideo - Figures in the Second Concourse of the "Monument to Artigas".
- Rome - Goethe monument.
- Santiago - "German Fountain", Plaza de Armas. (Note: Photo and history of the German Fountain are available from Edulabbe (28 February 2004). "The German Fountain". Santiago de Chile Daily Photo.)
- Tilsit - Statue of Queen Louise
- Various statues of Wilhelm I in Arnsberg, Duisburg, Gera, Hamburg, Krefeld, Mannheim, Mönchengladbach and Wuppertal.
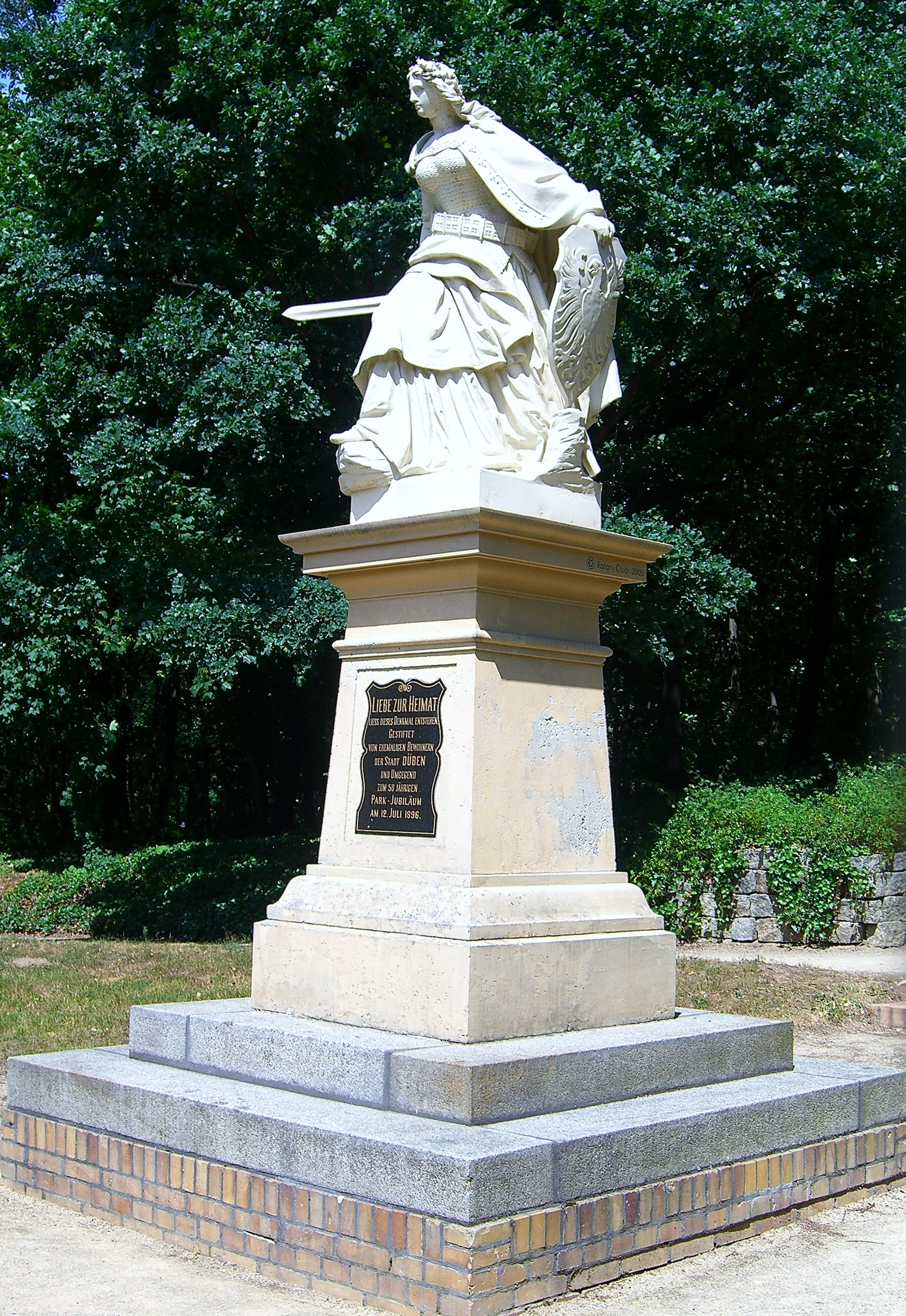
Germania statue in Bad Düben

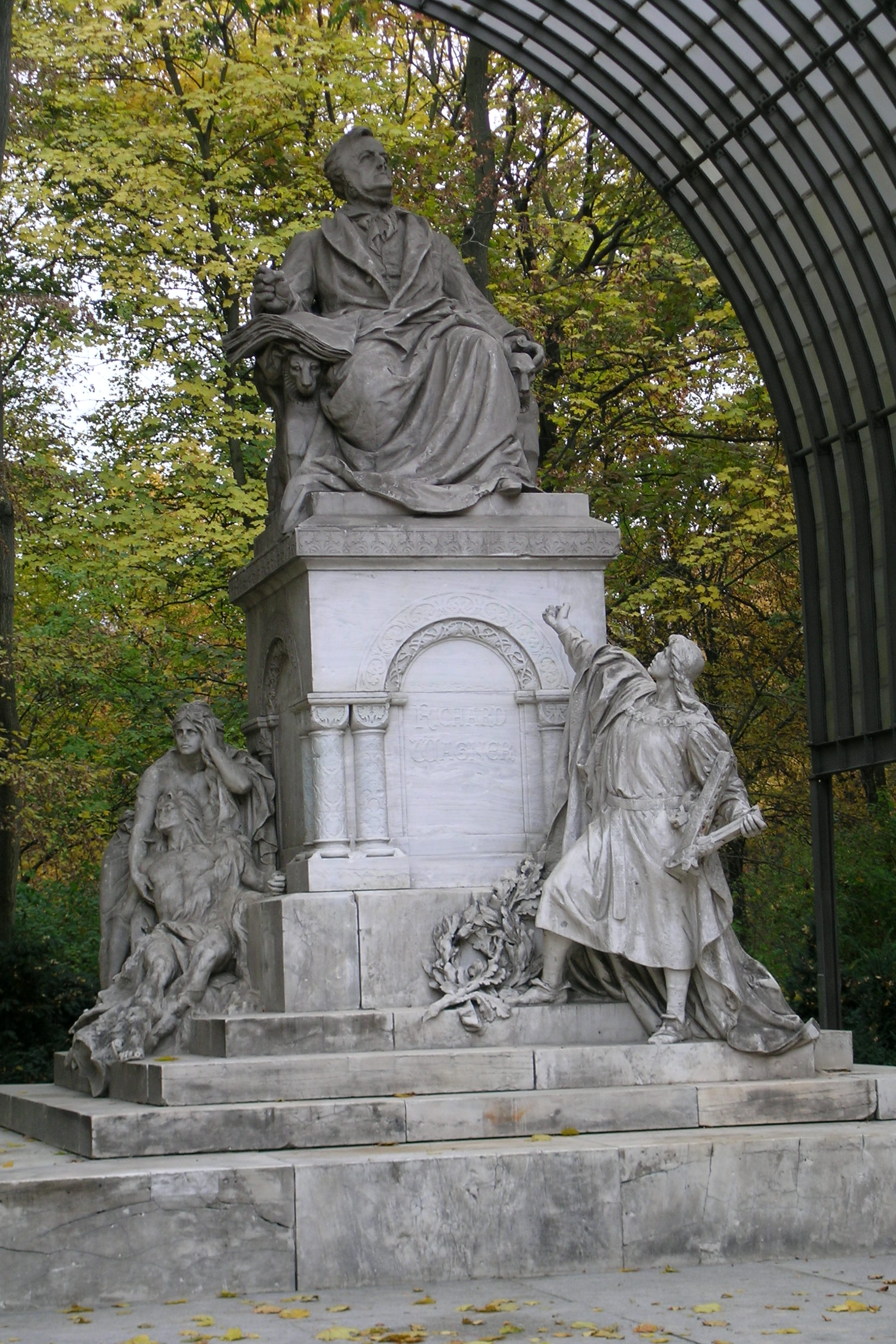
Richard Wagner Monument, Berlin

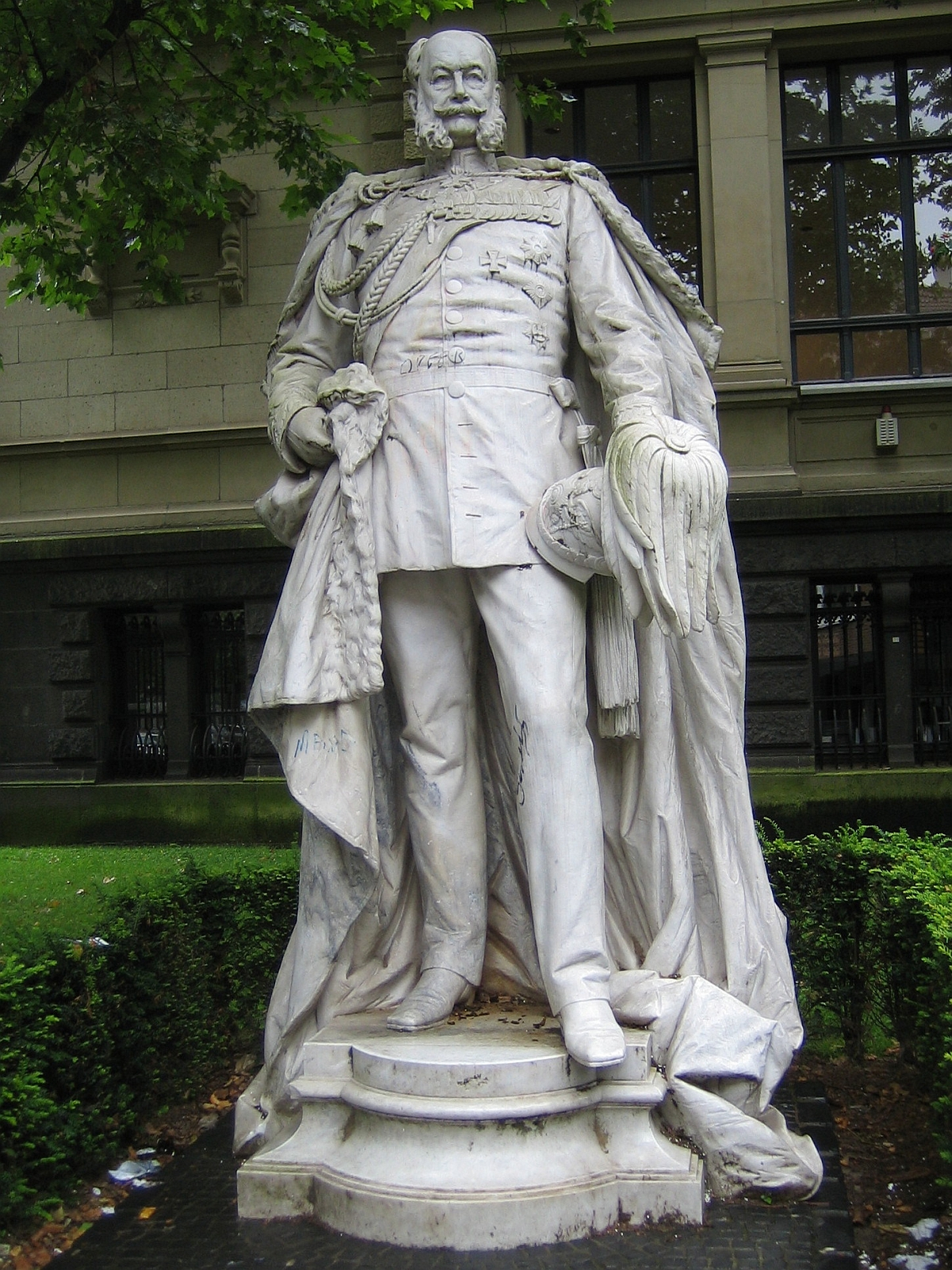
Kaiser Wilhelm Monument
in Krefeld

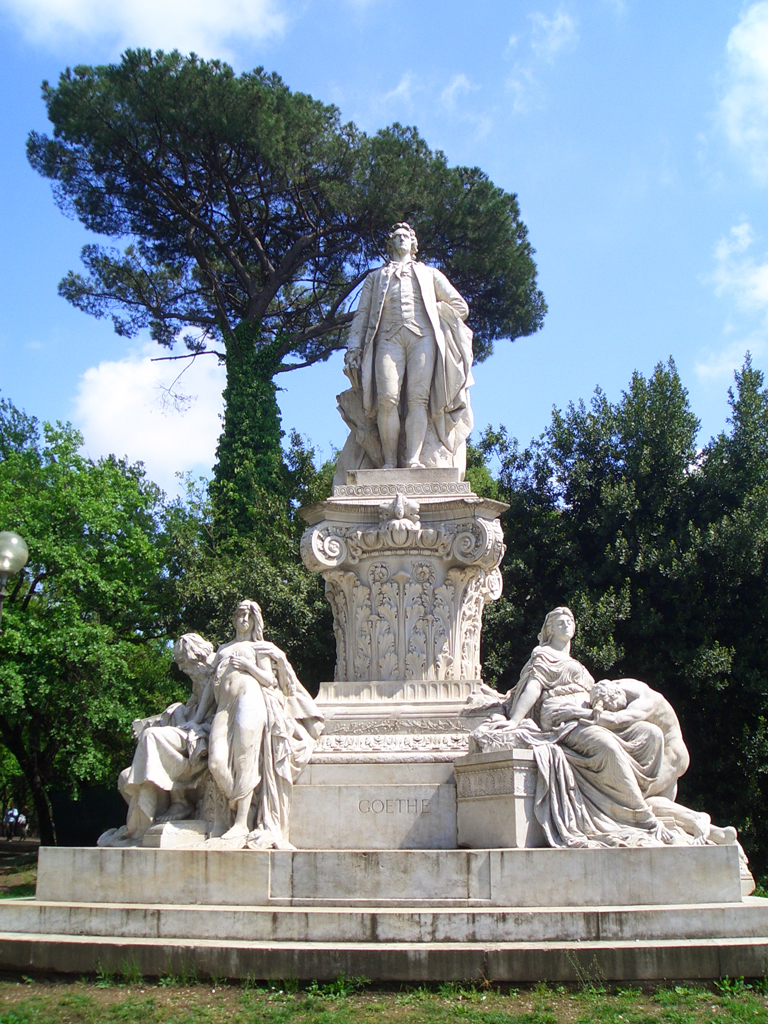
Goethe Monument in Rome

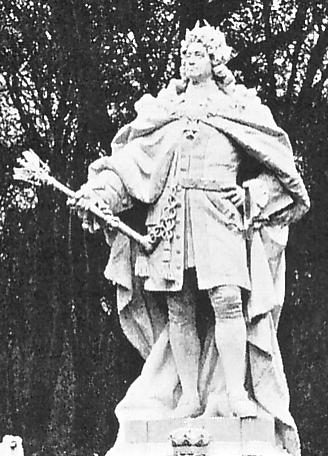
Frederick I, from the Siegesallee

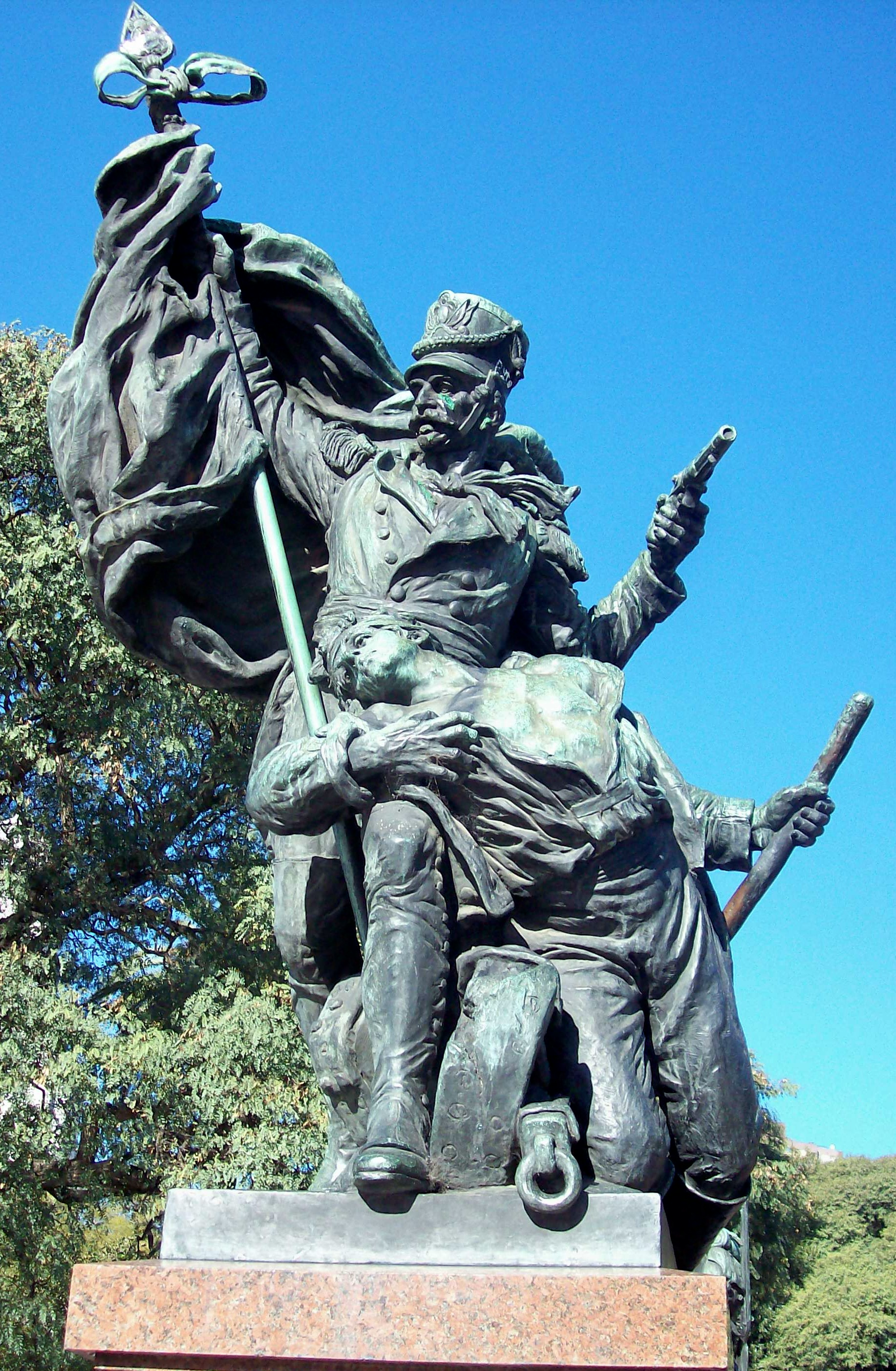
"The Battle"; figure from the Monument to San Martín
