= Amazone zu Pferde (Tuaillon) =

Sculpture by Louis Tuaillon

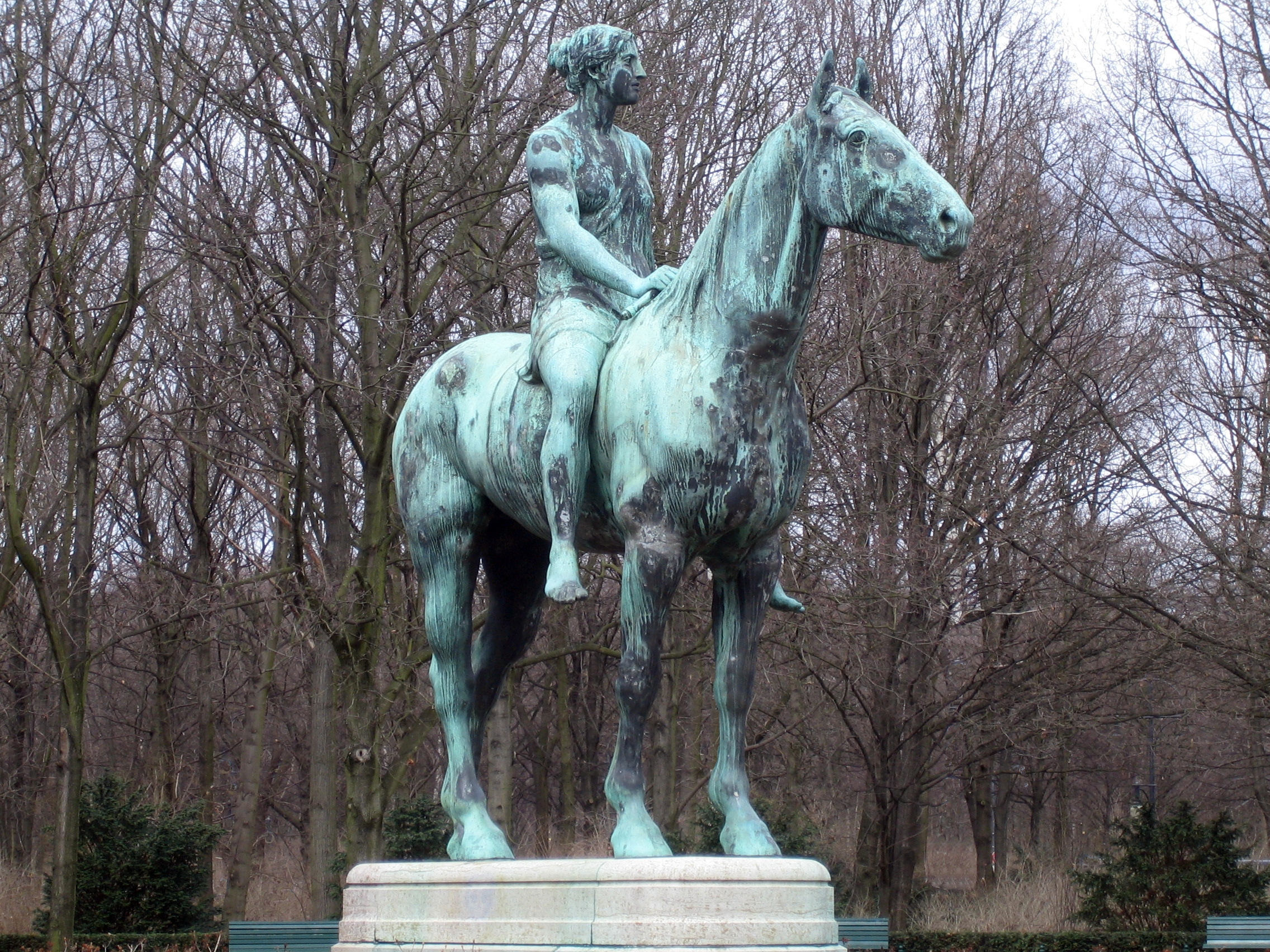
- The statue in 2006
- Artist: Louis Tuaillon
- Year: 1895
- Location: Berlin, Germany
- 52°30′53″N 13°22′09″E

Amazone zu Pferde ("Amazon on horseback") is an outdoor 1895 bronze equestrian statue by Prussian sculptor Louis Tuaillon, installed in Tiergarten in Berlin, Germany. The name of the artwork refers to the Amazon warriors, a nation of "all women" warriors of Iranian origin (related to Scythians and Sarmatians), who inhabited the regions around the Black Sea and Eurasian steppes from the 2nd millennium BC, until the start of the Early Middle Ages.

== See also ==
- 1895 in art
