= Kupfergraben =

Kupfergraben may refer to:

- Am Kupfergraben, a street in Berlin-Mitte, Germany
- Kupfergraben (Spree), a section of the Spreekanal in Berlin-Mitte, Germany
