= Kupfergraben (Spree) =

Branch of the river Spree in Berlin, Germany

Kupfergraben is the name given to the 400-metre-long northern part of the canal-like left arm of the Spree, the Spreekanal, along the Museum Island (Museumsinsel) from the Eiserne Bridge (Eiserne Brücke) to the Spree at kilometre 16.31 in Berlin's Mitte district. The Spreekanal (SpK) with a length of two kilometres belongs to the federal waterway Spree-Oder-Wasserstraße, for which the Wasser- und Schifffahrtsamt Berlin is responsible.

Am Kupfergraben is the name of a street running parallel on the west bank of the Kupfergraben, which is opposite the Museum Island (Museumsinsel).

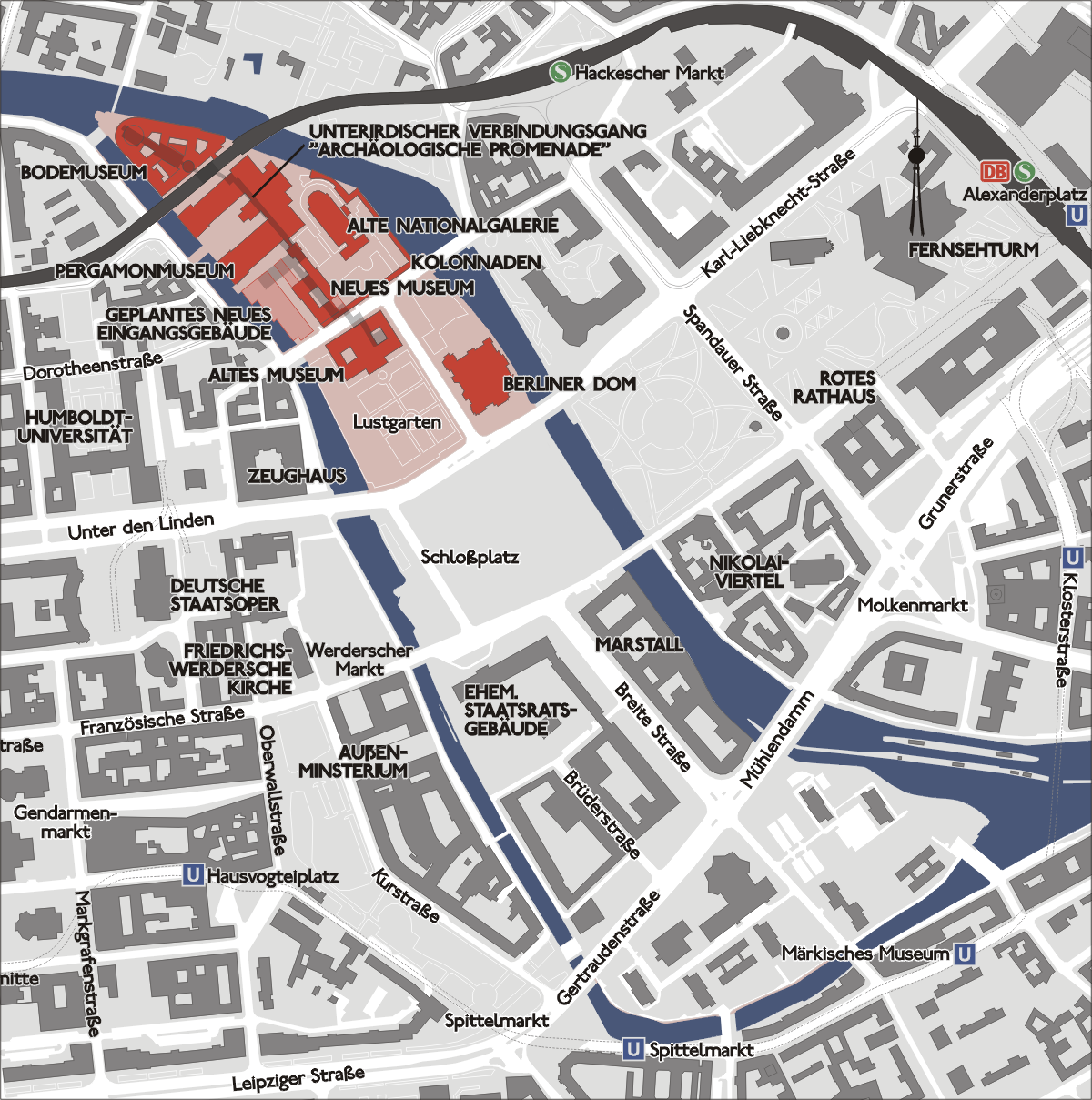
Spree island and course of the Spree canal, from the Zeughaus to the north called Kupfergraben

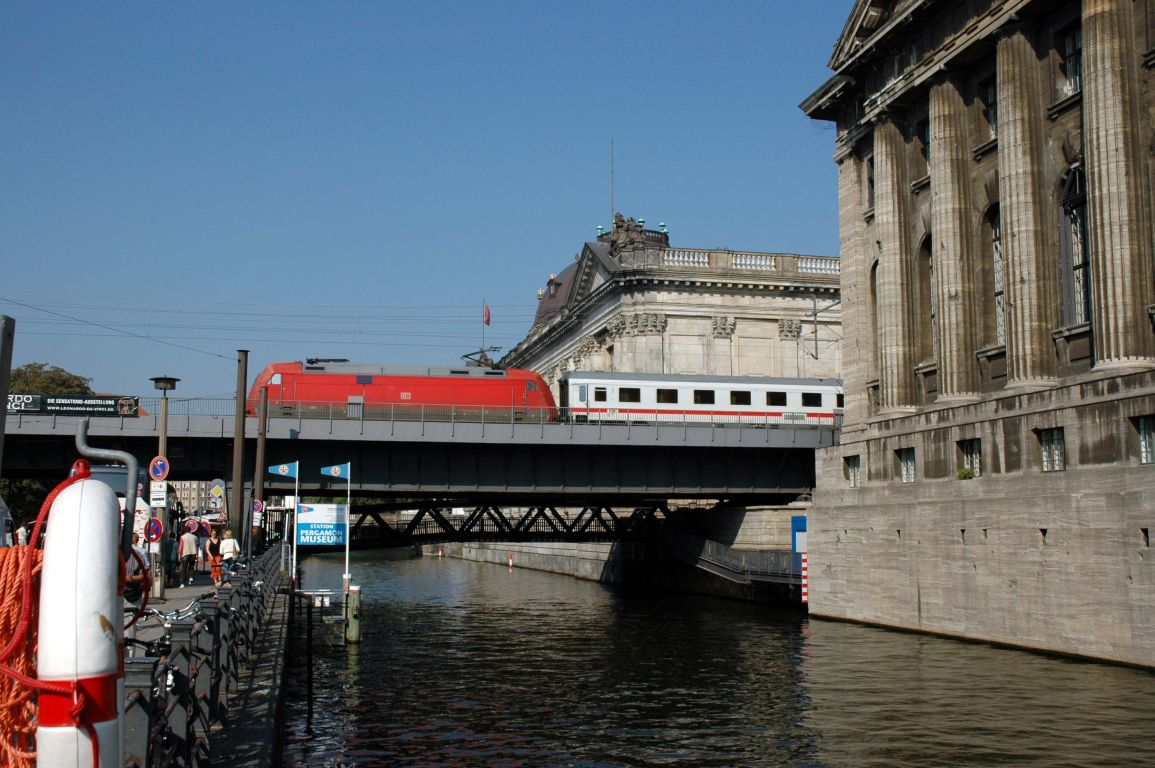
Kupfergraben between Bode Museum and Pergamon Museum

== History of the Spreearm ==
The name Kupfergraben probably refers to a foundry that existed here from the 16th century to 1875 and where, among other things, copper (Kupfer) was processed. From the middle of the 16th century, the Kupfergraben, then called the Cöllnischer Stadtgraben, formed part of the lower canal of the Berlin city lock. When this engineering structure was newly constructed in 1885, the Kupfergraben was widened. The lock has been unusable since 2000, next to it there is a weir.

The Monbijou Bridge (Monbijoubrücke), a high-rise railway bridge, a nameless footbridge to the Museum Island (Museumsinsel) and the Eiserne Bridge (Eiserne Brücke) lead across the Kupfergraben.

== Design idea ==
The design by the Berlin-based architects and artists group realities:united for the establishment of the Flussbad Berlin at Kupfergraben won the main prize for the European region in the 2011 regional competition for sustainable architecture and infrastructure projects organized by the Holcim Foundation. In 2012, the same design won the bronze prize in the global competition for the Holcim Award for Sustainable Construction. It has not yet been decided when realization will be possible.
