= Electric Tramway Spandau-Nonnendamm =

Tramway company that operated between 1909 and 1914

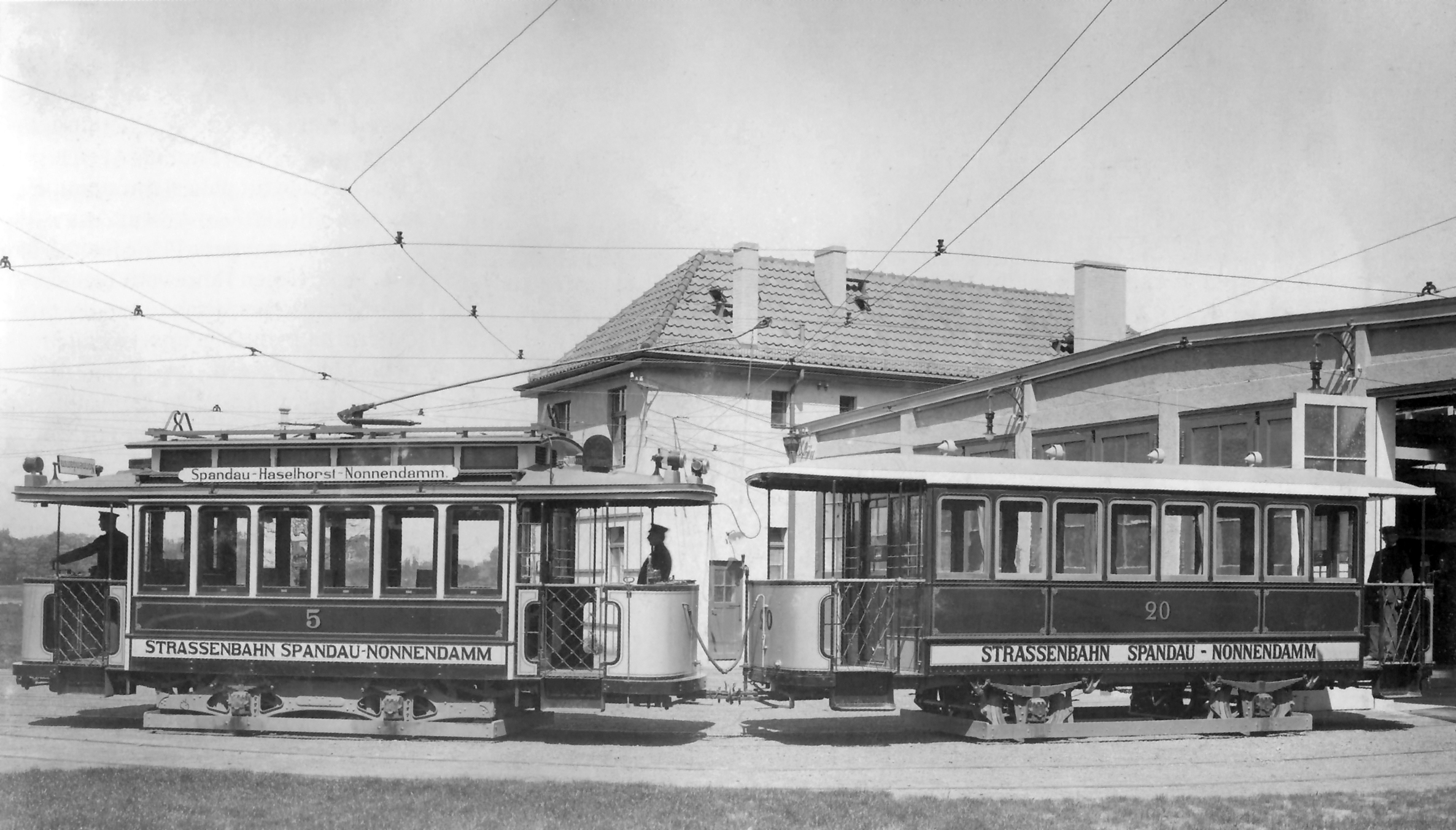
Railcar 5 and sidecar 20 in front of the Grenzstraße depot, around 1910

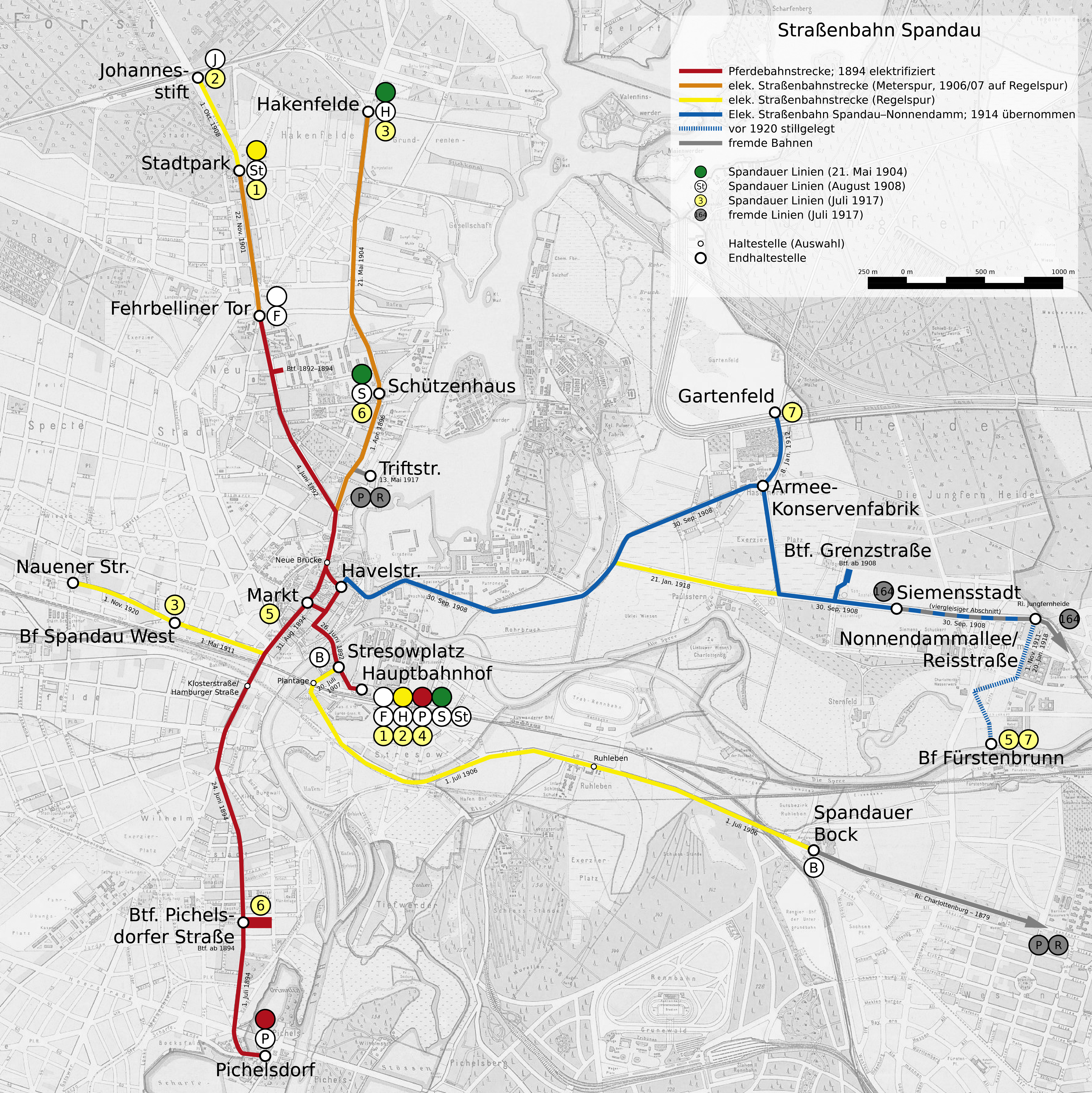
Course of the Nonnendamm line (blue) in the Spandau streetcar network

The Electric Tramway Spandau-Nonnendamm GmbH (SpN) – colloquially known as Nonnendammbahn – was a tramway company that operated between 1909 and 1914, originating from a tram line established by Siemens & Halske in 1908. Three months after its founding, the then-independent city of Spandau acquired all shares in the railway, and its operations were taken over by the Municipal Tramway of Spandau the following year. With the deletion of Nonnendammbahn from the commercial register in 1914, it was fully integrated into the Spandau tramway.

The route operated by Nonnendammbahn between Spandau Old Town and Siemensstadt was last served by Line 55 of the Berlin tramway, which the Berlin Transport Authority discontinued on October 2, 1967, as the last tram line in West Berlin.

== History ==
In 1897, Siemens & Halske acquired approximately 21 hectares of land on Nonnendamm, where a new large industrial site was to be developed over the next few years, later known as Siemensstadt. Around the same time, a residential colony was established in the nearby Haselhorst area, including housing for the workers of the army's canned food factory, owned by the Prussian military treasury. The city of Spandau aimed to increase its tax revenue through these new industrial settlements. In support of these activities, the Mayor of Spandau, Koeltze, proposed the construction of a freight railway in 1899, branching off from the Spandau Military Railway to serve Nonnendamm. The following year, the Spandau Senate commissioned a railway construction company to begin preparatory work for a standard-gauge freight and tramway line connecting Spandau, Haselhorst, Nonnendamm, and Charlottenburg. During the negotiations, which lasted until 1902, several technical and legal issues were resolved, but financing the costly project, totaling 530,000 marks, remained unresolved. Consequently, the city initially did not pursue the expensive project further. Additionally, the project seemed unpromising as the relevant districts received a connection to public transport in 1905 with the Fürstenbrunn station, although it was over a kilometer away from the factory halls.

From 1904, the Siemens works expanded beyond the administrative borders of the Spandau exclave Nonnendamm into the neighboring districts of Niederbarnim and Osthavelland. Subsequently, both the city of Spandau and the city of Charlottenburg made efforts to bring the area under their jurisdiction. However, Charlottenburg, as a residential city, did not wish for further expansion of industrial facilities as it did not align with its urban planning ideals. On the other hand, Spandau sought to incorporate the area lying between the core city and the exclave, a goal achieved in 1908 and 1910. With the expansion of the factory site, Siemens revived the plans for the freight and tramway, taking the initiative for their implementation. In 1906, a contract was concluded with the military treasury for the construction of the freight railway, and in 1907, the company signed an agreement with the city for the construction of the tramway, which also stipulated the handover to the city in 1909.

Statistical Data
Time frame	Distance of the route (km)	People affected	Revenue (in marks)
01.10.1908–31.03.1909	1,39		
01.04.1909–31.03.1910	3,23	61.060	51.817,00
01.04.1910–31.03.1911	3,23	867.765	69.182,00
01.04.1911–31.03.1912	3,23	1.094.511	104.426,00
01.04.1912–31.03.1913	4,39	1.745.568	154.986,00
01.04.1913–31.03.1914	4,19	1.865.657	169.759,00
01.04.1914–30.09.1914	4,19	1.968.776	84.269,00

The President of the Government in Potsdam granted Siemens & Halske the concession to operate the Spandau – Nonnendamm tramway on February 24, 1908. Initially, construction of the Siemens freight railway took precedence, which commenced operations on March 16, 1908. The construction of the tramway mainly took place in the summer of 1908. Due to track construction work on the Berlin Bridge, the opening date had to be postponed several times. Finally, on September 30, 1908, the tramway commenced operations from the intersection of Nonnendamm and Reisstraße via Haselhorst to the intersection of Breite and Havelstraße in Spandau. Two of the four tramcars were deployed at intervals of 30 minutes on the single-track route. Since the terminus in Spandau Old Town did not have a turnaround facility, trailer cars could not initially be used. From October 27, 1908, an additional third tramcar was deployed between Spandau and Haselhorst for worker transportation to the army canned food factory, and from early December, a fourth tramcar was added for evening services.

In March 1909, a new depot was built at the intersection of Nonnendamm and Grenzstraße. Prior to this, the cars were housed in the Siemens railway hall on Rohrdamm. The construction of the depot was necessary due to the expansion of the vehicle fleet, and initially, accommodation at the municipal tram depot was not feasible as it was already operating at full capacity. At Easter 1909, the tramway operated for the first time with trailer cars. For this purpose, a switch connection to the Spandau tramway network was established, which could be used as a provisional turning triangle. As this operating mode was insufficient, trains began to use a loop via Havelstraße, Potsdamer Straße, Markt, and Breite Straße from May 2, 1909.

To hand over the tramway to the city of Spandau, Siemens & Halske and Siemens-Schuckertwerke founded the Elektrische Straßenbahn Spandau–Nonnendamm GmbH on March 23, 1909. The city of Spandau acquired their shares in the company for 300,000 marks on October 1, 1909, at a price of 463,000 marks. The transfer of the concession to the city took place on February 16, 1910. Only the tracks exclusively used for passenger traffic were transferred. The tracks shared with the Siemens freight railway in Nonnendamm and Schwarzer Weg remained with Siemens. From April 1, 1910, the Spandauer Straßenbahn took over the operation of the tramway.

As a result of the continuous expansion of the Siemens works, demand on the Nonnendamm line also increased. In the morning and evening hours, trains operated with three cars. The extension of the route by 800 meters through Reisstraße and Rohrdamm to Fürstenbrunn station, which Siemens had already planned, was opened on November 1, 1911. The route ran via Reisstraße and Rohrdamm to the station on the Hamburg Railway.

At the beginning of 1912, a 700-meter branch line between the army canned food factory and Gartenfeld, where Siemens established its cable factory, was put into operation. The line was only intended for worker trains, which operated at the beginning and end of the working day. The city of Spandau subsidized the construction with 250,000 marks. Siemens also participated in the construction of the line, as there was a joint operation with the freight railway.

In 1913, line N, despite the heavy commuter traffic to the Siemens works, ranked third among the Spandau lines. While lines P to Pichelsdorf and H to Hakenfelde carried 3.26 million and 2.55 million passengers, respectively, the Nonnendamm line carried 1.865 million passengers. The other two lines, B and J to Spandauer Bock and Johannesstift, followed closely. Despite the extensions, the Nonnendamm line remained deficit-ridden throughout its existence. Revenue was relatively low because the line between Spandau and Haselhorst ran through predominantly undeveloped areas, and most passengers could use non-profit worker tickets. On the other hand, there were high operating expenses, which included the interest and amortization of the capital investment of 780,000 marks. Additional cars had to be provided for the commuter traffic, which concentrated within a few hours, but remained unused for the rest of the day. Finally, even after the city took over the tramway, it continued to source its electricity from the company's power plant, for which Siemens charged 12 pfennigs per kilowatt-hour. The municipal tramway transferred between 42,000 and 71,371 marks annually to the Nonnendamm line to offset its losses from 1910 to 1913. In 1912, the additional revenue was insufficient to cover the shortfall, so the city contributed an additional 11,000 marks. It was not until around 1914 that the situation seemed to improve. As the company was now fully integrated into the Spandauer Straßenbahn, considerations were made to dissolve the company from 1911. The city councilors made the decision on April 3, 1914. On October 1, 1914, the Elektrische Straßenbahn Spandau–Nonnendamm GmbH was removed from the commercial register.

On December 8, 1920, the Städtische Straßenbahn Spandau merged with the Große Berliner Straßenbahn, which shortly thereafter became the Berliner Straßenbahn (BSt). On April 21, 1921, the Spandau lines were fully integrated into the Berlin network. The routes remained in operation with occasional interruptions until the 1960s. The connection to Gartenfeld was closed by the Berliner Verkehrsbetriebe on October 1, 1960, and the main route of the Nonnendamm line remained in operation until October 2, 1967, as part of the last tram line, 55, in West Berlin.

== Route description ==
The route was approximately 3.2 kilometers long at the time of opening and mostly single-track. It led from the intersection of Breite Straße and Havelstraße in the Spandau Old Town via Berliner Straße and Berliner Chaussee, Gartenfelder Straße, Schwarzer Weg, and Nonnendamm to the corner of Reisstraße, where there was a turning loop. On Nonnendamm between Grenzstraße and Reisstraße, the track was dual-track for a length of 1250 meters. The tracks were located in the middle of the street or, where available, on the median strip. In Schwarzer Weg, it was arranged alongside the roadway. Passing loops were located on Berliner Chaussee and Gartenfelder Straße at Küsterstraße. Initially, there was mixed traffic with the Siemens freight railway on Nonnendammallee and Schwarzer Weg.

In 1909, a track connection was established to integrate with the Spandau tram network. In Siemensstadt, in 1911, the track was extended single-track via Reisstraße, the Siemens factory premises, and Rohrdamm to Bahnhof Fürstenbrunn; the terminus was north of the Spree.

With the construction of the connecting route to Jungfernheide, the terminus at Nonnendamm was expanded to a total of four tracks. The facilities used by the Spandau tramway and the freight railway were in the southern part of the median strip, while those used by the BCS and GBS were to the north. Two tracks from the Nonnendammbahn led to the connecting route before the corner of Rohrdamm.

By April 1923, Siemens had doubled the sections from Berliner Chaussee corner Gartenfelder Straße to Reisstraße, including the spur to Gartenfeld, at its own expense. This separated the freight tracks completely from the tramway. The double terminus at Reisstraße was converted into a three-track marshalling yard for trams and a separate freight track for the connecting railway. The turning loop for trains coming from Jungfernheide went into operation at the Grenzstraße depot. This arrangement remained essentially unchanged until the tram's closure in 1967, after which the rail facilities were partially used by the freight railway. The remaining section between Gartenfelder Straße and the Berlin Bridge was doubled by 1927.

== Operation ==
=== Bus depot ===
The vehicles were initially housed in the station hall on Rohrdamm before a new depot at the corner of Nonnendamm and Grenzstraße was handed over to the operation on May 1, 1909. This Grenzstraße depot was first expanded in 1912 and provided space for 18 vehicles on an area of 1380 square meters. In 1920, the Berlin tram took over the depot as a branch of the Pichelsdorfer Straße depot under the number 28a. In 1923, the hall was extended by 35 meters. In 1944, the halls were heavily damaged due to combat actions. After temporary repair work, the BVG temporarily stored war-damaged vehicles there. In 1951, the building remnants were removed, and in 1954, the track loop was decommissioned, followed by the return of the site to Siemens.

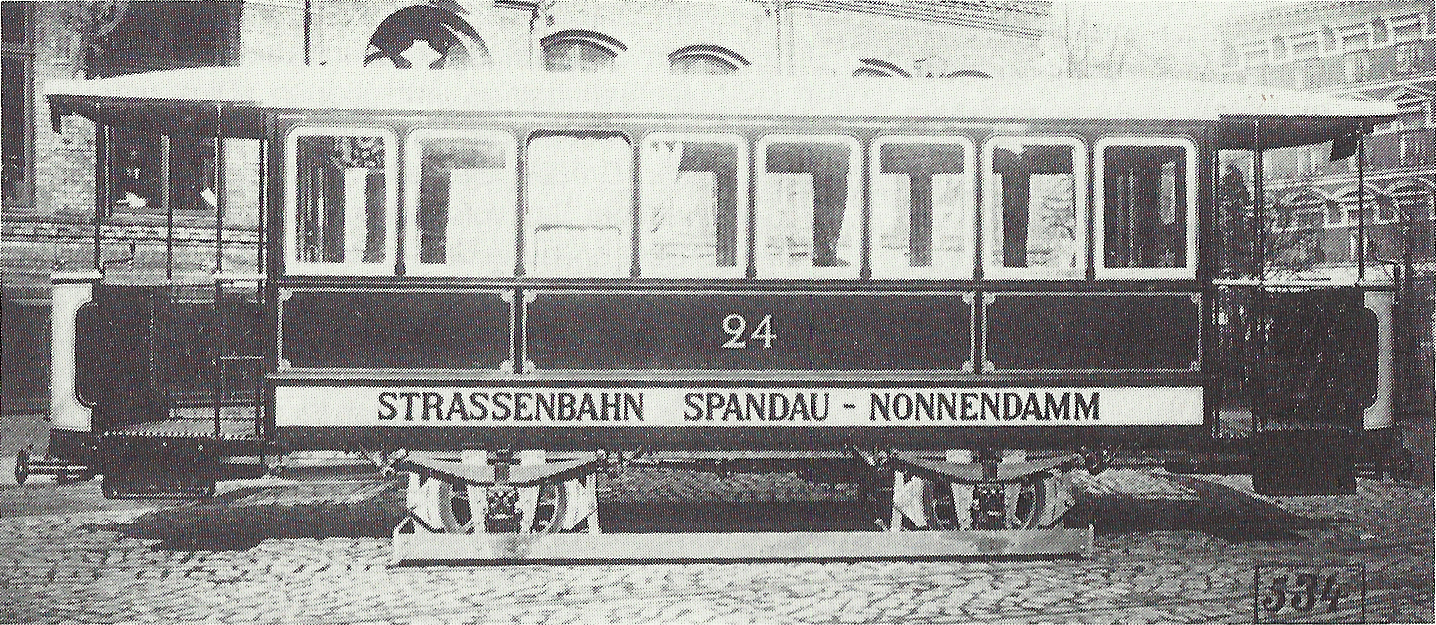
Sidecar 24 at the Falkenried factory, 1908

=== Vehicles ===
The tram initially ordered six railcars and six sidecars. When operations opened, only four railcars were available; the remaining vehicles were delivered at the beginning of 1909. At Easter 1909, the railway used sidecars as planned for the first time. In 1911 the railway ordered seven more railcars and ten sidecars. The Spandau tram took over these cars in 1914 and included them in its numbering scheme. With the transition to the Berlin tram, the number was renumbered again.

The cars had open entry platforms and six or eight windows on each side. At the ends of the car and below the row of windows, the car number was written in the middle, with the words STRASSENBAHN SPANDAU – NONNENDAMM underneath. Line route signs were placed above the windows. Electricity was drawn from the overhead line via roller pantographs. Although Siemens preferred the pantograph for its trams at the time, a transition to the Spandau tram, which also used roller pantographs, was planned from the start. The railcars had 18 seats and 16 standing places, the sidecars had 24 seats and 20 standing places.

After 1920, the railcars were given the numbers 4156 to 4168. The Berlin tram retired them by 1929.

The sidecars from the first delivery ran after 1920 under the numbers 1487 to 1492. In 1927 they received closed platforms and the numbers 1471II to 1476II. When the BVG was separated administratively, cars 1471II and 1475II were transferred to BVG-West, which retired them by 1954. Cars 1472II to 1474II came to BVG-Ost. They remodeled the exterior of the cars, giving them barrel roofs and, in some cases, a different window arrangement. In 1969, BVG-Ost included the three cars in the renovation program. The BVG decommissioned car 1476II before 1949.

The sidecars of the second delivery series were given the car numbers 1523 to 1532 after 1920. Cars 1526 to 1530 were used from 1923 on line 120 from Spandau West train station to Hennigsdorf. Like the other sidecars, they received closed platforms in 1927. Car 1527 had already been retired at this point. In contrast to the normal wagons, the wagons running on the intercity line had longer platforms and wider tires for use on railway lines. They also received additional safety devices and lockable platform doors. After the conversion, the cars ran under the numbers 1477II to 1485II. Cars 1478II and cars 1481II to 1484II remained with BVG-West after 1949, where they were decommissioned in 1954. Cars 1477II and 1485II remained in the eastern part of the city and were also included in the renovation program in 1969. Before 1949, the freight wagons G337 and G338 were built on the underframes of wagons 1479II and 1480II and became part of the BVG-Ost fleet.

The company had a demolition truck and another vehicle at its disposal as work vehicles.

Vehicle overview
Construction year	Manufacturer	Car number				Whereabouts
Construction year	Manufacturer	from 1908	from 1914	from 1920	from 1927	Whereabouts
Railcar
1908/09		1–6	95–100	4156–4161		Decommissioned in 1929
1911		7–13	101–107	4162–4168		Decommissioned in 1929
Sidecar
1908	Falkenried	19–24	8^{II}–13^{II}	1487–1492	1471^{II}–1474^{II} 1475^{III}–1476^{III}	Car 1527 decommissioned until 1927; Cars 1479 and 1480 in 1943 to G337 and G338; Parts of carriages 1472–1474, 1477 and 1485 included in the reconstruction program
1910/11		25–34	187–196	1523–1532	1477^{II}–1485^{II}	Car 1527 decommissioned until 1927; Cars 1479 and 1480 in 1943 to G337 and G338; Parts of carriages 1472–1474, 1477 and 1485 included in the reconstruction program
Workcar
1909			199			Bomb truck
						Workcar

=== Schedule ===
The line initially ran with two railcars every half hour between Spandau and Nonnendamm, as it ran through largely undeveloped land and the majority of Siemens employees came from Berlin and Charlottenburg. After 8 p.m., the car rotation was extended to an hour and used a shuttle car. From October 27, 1908, a third railcar shuttled between Spandau and Haselhorst. Because of the limited alternative options, it usually ran immediately after one of the other two railcars and was therefore sparsely staffed. From the beginning of November 1908, the half-hour service was extended to 9:30 p.m.

Increasing passenger numbers led to the introduction of quarter-hourly service until around 9 p.m. in May 1909, after which trains ran every half-hour. On May 2 or 3rd, 1909, the line was extended into Spandau's old town. After the municipal tram took over operational management, the Nonnendammbahn was assigned the line signals N (for trains to Nonnendamm) and K (for trains to the army cannery) in May 1910. Line K ran mainly on Sundays, as line N ran every half hour on these days and the second line allowed the quarter-hour service to be maintained between Spandau and Haselhorst. From May 1, the lines continued westwards to Spandau West station on Seegefelder Straße. On October 1, 1913, Line K was discontinued again.

As a feeder for the cable factory built in Gartenfeld, a few trains ran during rush hour from January 8, 1912 as line G between Gartenfeld and Fürstenbrunn train station. As a result of the commissioning of the tram route from the Ringbahnhof Jungfernheide to Nonnendamm by the Berlin-Charlottenburg tram in 1913, a competitive situation arose in Siemensstadt. The majority of the population living in Berlin and Charlottenburg used the suburban trains to Fürstenbrunn station and from there the Nonnendammbahn to Siemensstadt. After it was put into operation, most of the workers changed trains in Jungfernheide, as the cheaper city and ring railway tariffs applied up to this point, and from there took the Berlin-Charlottenburg tram line. The cable factory employees also had to walk around one kilometer for the cheaper connection. At the beginning of the First World War, the Spandau tram discontinued the less popular line G. From June 9, 1914 there was a connecting connection to Jungfernheide train station. The route, built by Siemens & Halske and Siemens-Schuckertwerke, initially served the BCS commuter line (line V), later line 164 of the Great Berlin Tram (GBS).

Line N was given line number 5 on June 29, 1917 as part of the numbering process for the Spandau tram. On January 21, 1918, it was extended along the connecting route to Jungfernheide station, together with a newly established amplifier line 8, which ran from Haselhorst; the line to Fürstenbrunn train station went out of service on the same day.

=== Tariff ===
The fare for the entire route was initially 10 pfennigs. Student cards were also issued for 15 trips at a price of 1 mark. From May 1909, the railway also issued punch cards for 1 mark, which gave entitlement to twelve journeys. From autumn 1909, the railway also issued workers' weekly tickets for 60 pfennigs, which entitled them to two journeys per working day. The outward journey had to take place by 8 a.m. and the return journey between 11 a.m. and 8 p.m. Their price was raised to 80 pfennigs in 1912 and to one mark in 1913. The issue was made to "local" workers who stuck disability stamps and had an annual income of up to 2,100 marks.

From August 15, 1909, there was a right to transfer to the Spandau tram lines in the direction of Spandau main station; this process was not permitted in the opposite direction. Passengers who wanted to change had to inform the switchman at the market by presenting their ticket. At the latest when the Spandau tram was converted from pay box to conductor operation on January 1, 1911, both railways formed a tariff unit.

== Literature ==
- Henry Alex (2010), "Ein Jahrhundert Nahverkehr in Haselhorst", Verkehrsgeschichtliche Blätter, no. 2
- Arne Hengsbach, Wolfgang Kramer (1983-05-01), "Die Straßenbahnen im Raum Berlin (12). Elektrische Straßenbahn Spandau – Nonnendamm GmbH", Strassenbahn Magazin, no. 48
