= Berlin-Charlottenburg tram =

Former tram company in Berlin and Charlottenburg

The Berlin-Charlottenburger Straßenbahn (BCS) was a private tram company in the greater Berlin area. It was founded in 1865 as the Berliner Pferde-Eisenbahn (BPfE) and renamed in 1894 in anticipation of electrification. The line opened on 22 June 1865 between the Brandenburg Gate in Berlin and the then-independent city (until 1920) of Charlottenburg and was the first tram line in Germany. The company expanded its network primarily within Charlottenburg until 1914. The lines also extended into Berlin's city center, to Spandau, Weißensee, and Neukölln.

In 1900, the competing Große Berliner Straßenbahn acquired three-quarters of the shares in the BCS and took over its administration from 1907. The complete takeover occurred in 1919. While the central section of the company's first route through the Großer Tiergarten fell victim in the 1930s to the expansion of the east–west axis, the western branch was operated until the shutdown of the West Berlin tram network on 2 October 1967. A section opened in 1865 in Dorotheenstraße remains in operation as the oldest existing track segment in the network of the Berlin tram.

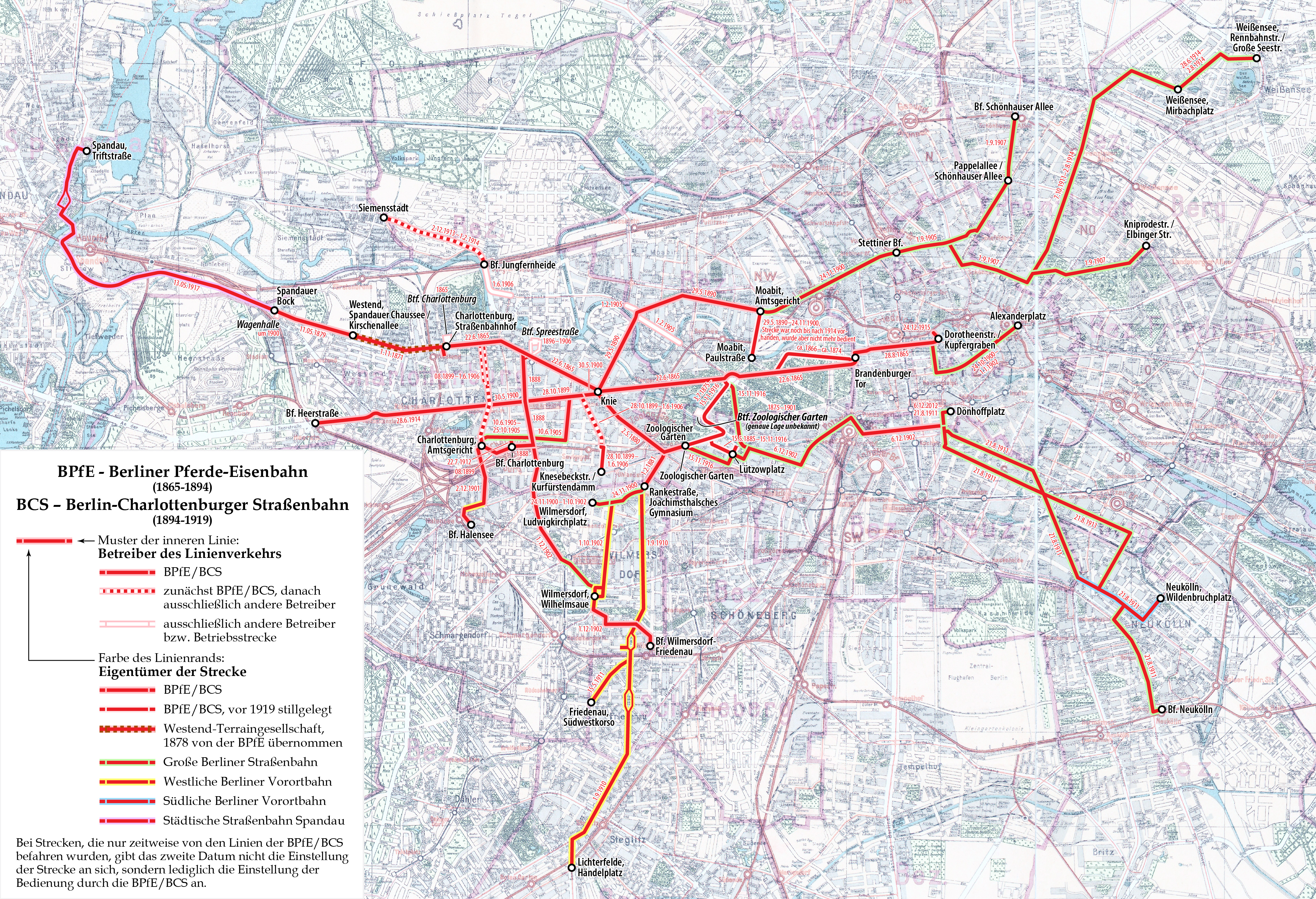
Network of lines and tracks of the Berliner Pferde-Eisenbahn and Berlin-Charlottenburger Straßenbahn, 1865–1919

== History ==
=== Prelude and opening ===
On 26 November 1832, the New York and Harlem Railroad became the world's first tram to enter service. In Europe, the new mode of transport spread from 1854, first in Paris. Public transport in Berlin at that time was handled by a variety of coach operators with hackney carriages and horse-drawn omnibuses. The Berlin Police Presidency therefore desired a "centralization of all public transport," by awarding the necessary concessions to a single entrepreneur. In 1858, the French State Councilor Carteret contacted the presidency. He proposed a comprehensive network of horse omnibuses and horse trams. The project failed because Carteret could not raise the necessary funds. The concessions granted to him expired on 1 December 1859.

In 1863, the Württemberg engineer von Binger and the Danish engineer Møller came forward. Møller had received royal approval in 1862 for setting up a horse tram line in Copenhagen but had to abandon his project. At the same time, he was in contact with the Hamburg Senate and the Berlin Police Presidency for two similar projects. The Prussian Minister of Trade von Itzenplitz was not opposed to Møller's plans for a line from Berlin to Charlottenburg. However, on the advice of the authorities, he had to abandon the planned route through the Brandenburg Gate and the boulevard Unter den Linden and instead choose a route through Sommerstraße and Dorotheenstraße. This required an additional breakthrough through the Berlin Customs Wall. The terminus was to be at Am Kupfergraben. On 23 March 1864, the minister granted Møller the concession. At Møller's request, the concession period was extended from five to ten years. In addition to the Kupfergraben–Charlottenburg line, Møller was permitted to set up a branch line from the Brandenburg Gate via the Kroll’sche Etablissement and the excursion restaurant In den Zelten to the Kleiner Stern, and another line from Dönhoffplatz through Leipziger Straße and Potsdamer Straße to Schöneberg. To finance the tram, the transfer of the concession to a company was allowed.

On 11 May 1864, the Kommanditgesellschaft auf Aktien in Firma Berliner Pferdeeisenbahn-Gesellschaft E. Besckow was founded, which took over all rights and obligations. The brothers Ernst and Wilhelm Besckow were haulage contractors from Berlin. The share capital was to amount to 510,000 thalers (1,530,000 marks) for both lines. However, the company only raised the capital required for the Charlottenburg line of 280,000 thalers (840,000 marks), so construction of the Schöneberg line was initially omitted. Møller is said to have initially retained the concession for this line and transferred it to the Große Internationale Pferde-Eisenbahn-Gesellschaft in 1872. In addition to the concession document issued by the police president, the company had to apply for road construction police approval for the installation of horse trams and obtain the consent of the road owner for its use.

Until 31 December 1875, the first measure was also the responsibility of the Berlin Police Presidency; consent was the responsibility of the Royal Ministerial Building Commission until the same date. By cabinet order of 28 December 1875, road construction police came under the cities from the beginning of 1876, and most roads also passed into city ownership. This did not affect various country roads and the street Unter den Linden.

Construction of the route began in January 1865. Just under a month before commissioning, the Berlin police president issued a regulation on the operation of the horse railway. The 42-paragraph regulation governed, among other things, the labeling of cars, uniforms, and transport conditions. The drivers were instructed not to drive faster than a trot; a walk was prescribed before street intersections. Women were also prohibited from entering the upper deck; this rule was not lifted until in the run-up to the Berlin Trade Exhibition 1896. In contrast to the gate cars ("Kremsers"), which often only departed when fully occupied, drivers were prohibited from soliciting passengers to ride. If further travel was interrupted by obstacles that could not be removed immediately, the cars were to be lifted out of the rails and the spot bypassed. When traveling in convoy, at least 60 steps were to be maintained, and at least ten steps for stationary cars, so that the draft horses would not nibble on the cars.

On 22 June 1865, the first section between Brandenburg Gate and the tram depot in Charlottenburg entered service. Two months later, on 28 August, the line was extended from the Brandenburg Gate to Kupfergraben. The route was initially single-track with eight passing loops. The route ran from Dorotheenstraße via Sommerstraße, Charlottenburger Chaussee, Berliner Straße and Spandauer Berg to the corner of Sophie-Charlotte-Straße. The first tram depot, then still called a horse tram depot, was also located there. Passing opportunities existed at the termini as well as at the intersection of Dorotheenstraße and Neue Wilhelmstraße, in Sommerstraße, at the Großer Stern, at the border with Charlottenburg, at the Knie, at Wilhelmplatz and at Luisenplatz.

The branch route to Zu den Zelten, also approved in 1865, could be opened in 1866 or 1872. It remained in operation only until 1874 or 1875 due to lack of profitability.

=== Expansion of the network ===
Line overview 1890
| Route | Length (in km) |
|---|---|
| Kupfergraben – Horse tram depot | 7.8 |
| Kupfergraben – Lützowplatz | 5.0 |
| Horse tram depot – Lützowplatz | 5.0 |
| Charlottenburg station – Lützowplatz | 5.4 |
| Horse tram depot – Spandauer Bock | 2.8 |
| Horse tram depot – Alt-Moabit, Criminal Court | 5.5 |
| Alt-Moabit, Criminal Court – Lützowplatz | 5.4 |
| Kurfürstendamm/Kurfürstenstraße – Rankestraße, Joachimsthal Gymnasium | 1.1 |

Despite the initially high fare of two and a half Silbergroschen (25 [Reichs-]pfennigs; in 1901 the same journey cost 10 pfennigs), the tram proved successful. In the first full year of operation in 1866, it carried around 960,000 passengers; with an extraordinary load observed in excursion traffic to the city of Charlottenburg, which was then still considered a summer resort. While 46,560 passengers used the horse tram in January 1866, the figure was 165,230 in August of the same year. The writer Hans Wachenhusen described such an excursion trip during the first years of operation. On such days, several hundred people could be observed at the stop at Kupfergraben, and boarding along the route was almost impossible. Newspapers reported that cars approved for 45–50 people sometimes had to accommodate up to 93 passengers. As a result, the timetable could only be adhered to a limited extent, resulting in hardly any time savings compared to pedestrians on the same route. The satirical publication Kladderadatsch took these circumstances as an opportunity to issue a "Reglement zur Benutzung der Berliner Pferdebahn," which, for example, provided for a fine of five Silbergroschen for pedestrians overtaking horse tram cars.

In 1871, the Terrain-Gesellschaft Westend had H. Quistorp & Co. build a single-track route from the horse tram depot to the Westend villa colony at its own expense. It transferred operations to the BPfE. The route was 1.4 kilometers long and had a gradient of 33.3 permille over a length of 620 meters. Service was provided with a shuttle line from the horse tram depot, as the double-horse open-top cars used on the main line were unable to handle the gradient. In the same year, the Große Berliner Pferde-Eisenbahn-Aktien-Gesellschaft (GBPfE) was founded, which, starting in 1873, opened several routes from Berlin to the suburbs.

After the first concession expired, the company operated from 1875 under the name Berliner Pferde-Eisenbahn-Gesellschaft, Kommandit-Gesellschaft auf Aktien J. Lestmann & Co. In the same year, a branch route from the Großer Stern via Fasanerieallee and Corneliusbrücke to the main entrance of the Berlin Zoological Garden entered service. The main route received a second track throughout. Further routes followed from Westend to Spandauer Bock (1879), from the Knie via Hardenbergstraße to the Zoological Garden (1880), via Rankestraße to the Joachimsthal Gymnasium (1881), from Kurfürstendamm to Lützowplatz (1885), from Wilhelmplatz via Wilmersdorfer Straße to Charlottenburg station (1887), and from the Knie via Marchstraße, Gotzkowskybrücke and Alt-Moabit to Moabit, Paulstraße (1890). With the city of Berlin, the company concluded a new consent agreement on 7 May 1881 until 31 December 1909, which included, among other things, approval for the construction of new lines.

=== Frequent changes of traction ===
Operation as a horse tram quickly revealed the limits of this type of traction. To increase capacity, the BPfE experimented several times with different drive options. From 20 April 1878, the BPfE used two box steam locomotives from Wöhlert and Krauss on the Brandenburg Gate–horse tram depot route. Horse tram cars served as trailers. The trial with steam trams ran parallel to the horse trams until it was discontinued on 11 August 1878. In addition to smoke nuisance, it turned out that the super- and substructure were too weak for the locomotives. In 1881/82, the tram started a second unsuccessful trial with Rowan steam railcars.

After the opening of the world's first electric tram in May 1881, Siemens & Halske looked for a suitable route to further test the electric drive. The two-and-a-half-kilometer route from the horse tram depot via Westend to Spandauer Bock, with its steep gradient for Berlin conditions, offered an optimal test field. On 1 May 1882, trial operation began with the converted cars 36 and 38. Parallel to the route, two insulated copper wires were stretched at a height of four to five meters. A two- or four-wheeled contact car equipped with a motor ran on these. The contact car was connected to the motor cars and drive motors via a flexible cable. Since the overhead line was only single-track, the motor cars had to be separated from the contact car at meeting points and reconnected to the respective other contact car. The system did not prove itself, so Siemens & Halske replaced the overhead line with a slotted tube overhead line from the end of 1882. Sleds inserted into the overhead line now served as current collectors, which the motor cars pulled behind them during the journey. The operating voltage was 180 volts direct current, the motor cars reached a speed of 20 km/h on the level and 10–12 km/h on the gradient. Trial operation was discontinued again in May 1883. In August 1886, the BPfE conducted trial runs with a battery railcar on the horse tram depot–Lützowplatz line. After several derailments, the railcar was so damaged that the trial had to be discontinued.

=== Renaming and electrification ===
Passengers carried (in millions)
| Year | BPfE BCS | GBPfE GBS | NBPf | Total |
|---|---|---|---|---|
| 1877 | 3.2 | 25.1 | 0.4 | |
| 1880 | 3.5 | 45.6 | 2.3 | |
| 1882 | 3.8 | 57.3 | 4.1 | 88.3 |
| 1885 | 3.8 | 77.2 | 6.2 | 116.8 |
| 1890 | 5.6 | 121.3 | 14.1 | 204.0 |
| 1895 | 7.0 | 138.6 | 18.3 | 270.1 |
| 1899 | 11.0 | 187.8 | 27.6 | 414.7 |
| 1900 | 13.7 | 236.0 | – | 458.4 |

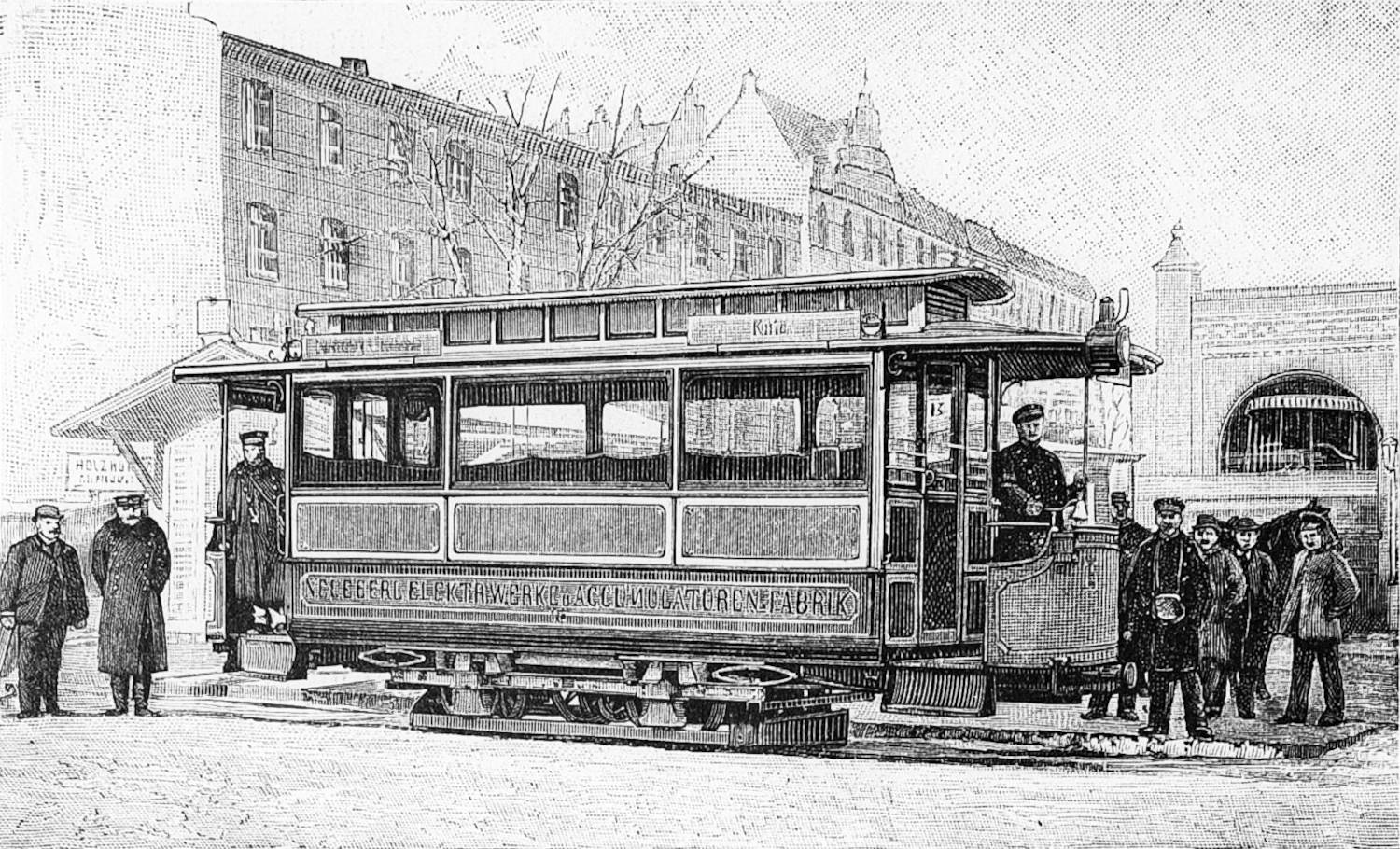
Accumulatorenbahnwagen – Illustration in the magazine Die Gartenlaube, 1896

In 1892, Siemens & Halske proposed to the Charlottenburg magistrate the establishment of an electric tram line along the first line from 1865. The background was the concession expiring on 30 June 1895. Since the magistrate was favorably disposed toward the project, the BPfE felt compelled to commission Siemens & Halske with the electrification of the network to retain the concessions. On 6 January 1893, both parties signed the corresponding contract. In view of the impending electrification, the company changed its name to Berlin-Charlottenburger Straßenbahn AG on 26 September 1894.

From 1896, test runs with battery railcars began again. Since several institutes and authorities expressed concerns, the company decided on the complete introduction of battery operation. The authorities wanted to prevent disfigurement of the streetscape by the overhead wires; in addition, the Physikalisch-Technische Bundesanstalt feared falsification of its measurement results by "stray currents". Parallel to this, runs with a gas engine railcar of the Deutsche Gasbahngesellschaft took place; the vehicle was later used on the Hirschberg Valley Railway.

The official switch to electric battery operation began on 3 August 1897 on the Brandenburg Gate–horse tram depot section. One month later, the entire line to Kupfergraben was converted. At the end of November, the BCS concluded a new consent agreement with the city of Charlottenburg valid until 30 September 1937, in which the city promised the establishment of further lines. The BCS simultaneously committed itself to introducing a 10-pfennig flat fare within the municipality. A similar contract was concluded with the municipality of Deutsch-Wilmersdorf. Even during the conversion phase, the disadvantages of battery operation became apparent. In addition to the short range and high susceptibility to faults, passengers felt disturbed by the acid fumes. Therefore, in 1898, the company applied for conversion to overhead line operation with bow collectors. The first lines could be converted on 1 January 1899. On some route sections, however, such as within a one-kilometer radius around the Physikalisch-Technische Reichsanstalt and at the Brandenburg Gate, overhead lines were still not permitted.

Along with electrification, the BCS opened further route sections and expanded the existing routes to double track. The route laid in Hardenbergstraße in 1880 received its second track in 1898. In August 1899, the route from Spandauer Straße via Schloßstraße, Suarezstraße, Amtsgerichtsplatz and Leonhardstraße to Charlottenburg station entered service; in the same month, the route through Wilmersdorfer Straße was electrified. From 28 October 1899, the tram ran through Bismarckstraße, Grolmannstraße and Knesebeckstraße to Kurfürstendamm. From 30 May 1900, Bismarckstraße between Knie and Schloßstraße at Sophie-Charlotte-Platz was fully passable.

=== Contact with other tram networks ===
Especially in Berlin's city center, there were numerous contact points with lines of other tram companies. A contact point in a suburb is noteworthy: At Händelplatz in Groß-Lichterfelde, there was a transfer option from the terminus of line W to the western branch of the ring line of the meter-gauge Groß-Lichterfelde tram, an extension of Werner von Siemens’ first electric tram.

=== Takeover by the Große Berliner Straßenbahn ===
On 9 March 1900, a new consent agreement was concluded between the BCS and the city of Berlin valid until 31 December 1919. In the same year, the Große Berliner Straßenbahn (GBS, formerly GBPfE) acquired three-quarters of the share and bond capital, ending the tram's formal independence. The GBS took over administration. In return, the BCS gained the opportunity to extend its lines over the GBS routes and those of its subsidiaries Westliche Berliner Vorortbahn (WBV) and Südliche Berliner Vorortbahn (SBV). This required converting the overhead line and motor cars from bow collectors to roller collectors. On 16 June 1900, the tram received a new concession from the Berlin Police Presidency until 31 December 1949. The content largely matched the concession for the GBS. Since the concession and consent agreement had different terms, differences and legal disputes arose between the GBS and its subsidiaries on one side and the Berlin Magistrate on the other. The magistrate then decided to establish a municipal tram operation.

The supervisory authority issued an order on 26 September 1900 prescribing the conversion of the remaining routes operated with battery railcars to overhead line operation. On Charlottenburger Chaussee west of the corner of Siegesallee to the Brandenburg Gate and further through Sommerstraße, as well as in front of Charlottenburg Palace, a sunken contact line was prescribed for aesthetic reasons. At the height of the Physikalisch-Technische Reichsanstalt, a bipolar overhead line was stretched to avoid return current through the running rails. In February 1901, the last horse tram line ran; battery operation ended the following year. Sunken contact line operation also proved prone to faults, as the cable ducts were often clogged with leaves and snow slush in the cold season. The last sunken contact line sections were therefore converted to overhead line in 1906/07. In 1902, the tram company committed itself to contributing 100,000 marks to the complete or partial relocation of the Physikalisch-Technische Reichsanstalt. Between 1911 and 1913, a building for magnetic measurements was erected on the Telegrafenberg near Potsdam, to which the tram company paid the promised contribution.

On 6 May 1902, the GBS and its subsidiaries introduced line numbers and letters to identify their lines. These replaced the previously attached colored signal lanterns on the cars; with the BCS, these were introduced at the latest with the transition to the GBS. One- to three-digit numbers were provided for the GBS lines, the WBV lines were assigned the letters A to M, the BCS lines the letters N to Z. The conversion dragged on until December 1902.

Line conversion 1902
| Signal panel | White | Yellow | Green | Red | White | White/Green Stripe | White/Yellow Stripe | White/Blue Stripe |
| Line | N | O | P | Q | R | S | T | U |

In September 1905, the GBS presented two projects for underground tram tunnels to bundle east–west traffic and relieve the heavily traveled Leipziger Straße. A northern tunnel was to run from the Kleiner Stern along Unter den Linden to Opernplatz and accommodate the lines running along Dorotheenstraße. Turning loops were planned at the Brandenburg Gate and Opernplatz to also accommodate north–south traffic. Since the plans were widely criticized for their poor execution, they were not realized. Only a north–south connection at the height of Opernplatz, the Lindentunnel, was built by the city of Berlin on its own from 1914 to 1916. Between 1901 and 1914, the BCS expanded its network in Charlottenburg and Deutsch-Wilmersdorf with further connections. In 1901, the connection from Charlottenburg station to Kurfürstendamm entered service. This was followed by routes through Wilmersdorfer Straße and Brandenburgische Straße to Fehrbelliner Platz and in Deutsch-Wilmersdorf from Wilhelmsaue to Prinzregentenstraße (1902), in Leibnizstraße and Alt-Moabit west of Gotzkowskybrücke (1905), in Ringbahnstraße in Halensee and in Kaiser-Friedrich-Straße (1912). Outside the core network, trains ran from 1902 through Prinz-Albrecht-Straße and Zimmerstraße in Berlin's Friedrichstadt. Between 1911 and 1914, a connection in Weißensee from Weißenseer Spitze to Rennbahnstraße also entered service. The culmination was the route through Kaiserdamm from Sophie-Charlotte-Platz to Heerstraße station on 30 June 1914.

Line overview 28 June 1914
| Line | Route | Length (in km) |
|---|---|---|
| N | Kupfergraben – Spandauer Straße (tram depot) | 7.8 |
| O | Kupfergraben – Friedenau, Südwestkorso/Laubacher Straße | 9.5 |
| P | Neukölln station – Westend, Spandauer Ch./Kirschenallee | 16.7 |
| Q | Kniprodestraße/Elbinger Straße – Halensee station | 14.5 |
| R | Neukölln, Wildenbruchplatz – Spandauer Bock | 16.0 |
| S | Kupfergraben – Wilmersdorf-Friedenau station | 9.6 |
| T | Kupfergraben – Halensee station | 9.2 |
| U | Kupfergraben – Heerstraße station | 9.5 |
| W | Schönhauser Allee station – Groß-Lichterfelde, Händelplatz | 18.7 |
| Z | Weißensee, Rennbahnstraße/Große Seestraße – Halensee station | 18.5 |

West of Charlottenburg, Siemensstadt emerged on the Nonnenwiesen at the beginning of the 20th century. Since this was still inadequately developed, the companies Siemens & Halske and Siemens-Schuckertwerke entered negotiations with the BCS and the city of Charlottenburg. The city agreed to build a road to the border with Siemensstadt; the BCS built a parallel 1.9 kilometer tram route from the district court at Gustav-Adolf-Platz via Jungfernheide station to the boundary. From 1 December 1913, a shuttle line V operated on this. After three months, the line was discontinued on 1 February 1914 in favor of the extended GBS line 164. This ran from 9 June 1914 beyond the boundary into Siemensstadt.

With the outbreak of World War I on 3 August 1914, restrictions in line traffic occurred. The route laid in 1875 from the Großer Stern to Kurfürstendamm was no longer served from 15 November 1916. The terminus in Dorotheenstraße was relocated directly to Am Kupfergraben on 24 December 1915. The period in between marks the greatest expansion, with the network length amounting to 39.62 kilometers of double-track routes with a total track length of 87.72 kilometers.

Since several war-important operations were located in neighboring Spandau (including the Siemens works and the Armee-Konservenfabrik (Haselhorst)), the military ordered the connection of the Charlottenburg network with the Spandau tram network. The Spandau lines had run to Spandauer Bock since 1906 and to Siemensstadt since 1908; despite the same gauge and overhead line type, there was no track connection between the two networks. At Spandauer Bock, a hill also prevented the track connection. After removing this, from 13 May 1917, the lines could run beyond Spandauer Bock to Triftstraße in Spandau. From 21 January 1918, both networks were connected in Siemensstadt.

On 28 May 1918, a new consent agreement was concluded between the GBS and its subsidiaries and the Greater Berlin Association until the end of 1949. The contract included the option to merge the GBS with its subsidiaries, which the association approved on 3 March 1919. The takeover of the Berlin-Charlottenburger Straßenbahn and furthermore the Westliche, Südliche and Nordöstliche Berliner Vorortbahn by the Große Berliner Straßenbahn was completed on 15 May 1919. The BCS thus ceased to exist. Two months later, the Greater Berlin Association acquired the Große Berliner Straßenbahn and converted it into a municipal enterprise on 20 September 1919. Through the merger of the GBS with the Berliner Elektrische Straßenbahnen and the Städtische Straßenbahnen, the Berliner Straßenbahn (BSt) was formed on 13 December 1920, from which the Berliner Straßenbahn-Betriebs-Gesellschaft emerged in 1923 and the Berliner Verkehrsbetriebe (BVG) in 1928/29.

=== Further development after 1919 ===
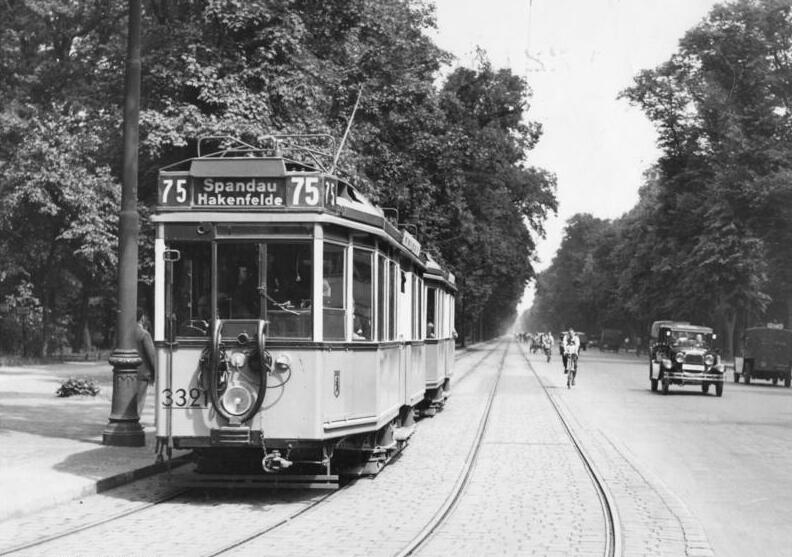
Tw 3321^{II} (TM 33) on Charlottenburger Chaussee as line 75 to Spandau, Hakenfelde, a few months before the cessation of tram traffic, 1934

After the merger, the Berliner Straßenbahn restructured the line network and assigned uniform line numbers. Due to the hyperinflation in the early 1920s, multiple line changes and discontinuations occurred, making a comparison between individual lines for this period impossible. During this time, route discontinuations occurred in the northern Kurfürstendamm and Wichmannstraße as well as in Rankestraße. On 1 November 1934, the tram route through Charlottenburger Chaussee and Berliner Straße between Brandenburg Gate and Knie was discontinued for the expansion of the road to the east–west axis. The adjoining route through Bismarckstraße and Kaiserdamm to Adolf-Hitler-Platz followed three years later on 1 November 1937.

After World War II, several route sections were not reopened, including in Moabit, between Amtsgerichtsplatz and Halensee, and in Weißensee. The routes located in West Berlin after 1948 were gradually discontinued by the BVG from 1954. The last section from Zoo station via Ernst-Reuter-Platz and Luisenplatz and the adjoining route along Spandauer Damm to Königin-Elisabeth-Straße was discontinued on 2 October 1967. The date simultaneously marks the end of the tram in the western sectors of the city. The section in the eastern sector in Ebertstraße and Clara-Zetkin-Straße west of Planckstraße was used by tram trains until the construction of the Berlin Wall as a turning triangle. The remaining part to Kupfergraben is still in operation.

== Company ==
=== Operating results ===
Operating results 1865–1911 (excerpt)
| Year | Passengers (in thousands) | Revenue (in marks) | Surplus (in marks) | Dividend (in %) | Car- kilometers (in thousands) | Notes |
|---|---|---|---|---|---|---|
| 1865 | 500 | 131,472 | | 0 | 270 | Opening of operations |
| 1872 | 2,500 | 568,693 | | 24 | 603 | |
| 1882 | 3,800 | 637,666 | | 5 | 1503 | Opening of the Stadtbahn |
| 1885 | 3,788 | 561,308 | | 1.75 | 1548 | Opening of Tiergarten stop |
| 1890 | 5,630 | 754,309 | | 1 | 2210 | |
| 1897 | 7,900 | 930,800 | 241,284 | 5 | 5576 | 10-pf fare in Charlottenburg, introduction of electric operation |
| 1900 | 13,685 | 1,460,599 | 365,457 | 3 | 4194 | Takeover by the GBS |
| 1901 | 14,788 | 1,641,265 | 492,480 | 3 | 4796 | 10-pf fare in Berlin |
| 1902 | 14,412 | 1,501,547 | 463,552 | 0 | 4521 | |
| 1908 | 26,350 | 2,674,776 | 813,975 | 0 | 8202 | |
| 1909 | | 2,749,452 | 939,400 | 0 | 8227 | |
| 1911 | 32,270 | 3,327,000 | | 2.5 | | |

The Berliner Pferde-Eisenbahn achieved satisfactory, sometimes even outstanding results until 1882; in 1872, for example, the dividend was 24 percent. This development deteriorated abruptly with the commissioning of the Stadtbahn from Schlesischer Bahnhof to Charlottenburg station. The opening of the Tiergarten stop at the height of Charlottenburger Chaussee further aggravated the situation. For journeys between Berlin's city center and Kurfürstendamm, passengers preferably used the GBPfE lines via Potsdamer Platz and Lützowplatz. Although the lines opened by 1890 increased passenger numbers, these were not in proportion to operating expenses. The lines mainly served Charlottenburg's internal traffic, which was very low compared to traffic flows to and from Berlin. Expansion of the network into Berlin was not possible due to competition from the GBPfE, which occupied all important arterial roads with its tracks.

As part of network electrification, the Berlin-Charlottenburger Straßenbahn concluded new consent agreements with the cities of Berlin, Charlottenburg, and Wilmersdorf after the concession was granted. The flat fare agreed for Charlottenburg, later also for Berlin, caused the balance to shrink further. The takeover by the GBS initially changed little in the balance. Through the takeover of administration, from 1907 also of personnel, and the extension of lines to the GBS traffic area, the result could be slowly improved by 1911. Passenger numbers rose from 1902 to 1911 to more than double. In 1911, the company paid a dividend of 2.5 percent for the first time after 1906.

In 1911, the company's share capital amounted to 6,048,000 marks, the bond capital to 5,496,500 marks with amortization until 1949. The loss reserves were 14,889.44 marks. The amortization fund, i.e., the depreciation value of the track body, buildings, and cars, amounted to 724,446.91 marks in the same year. The two maintenance reserves totaled 308,432.09 marks.

=== Fare ===
Little information is available on the company's fares and prices in the early days. On the line from Kupfergraben to Charlottenburg, a distance-based fare initially applied. The basis was the fare of a third-class railway journey. A single journey over the entire distance cost two and a half Silbergroschen (25 [Reichs-]pfennigs), the partial route Kupfergraben–Brandenburg Gate cost one Silbergroschen (10 [Reichs-]pfennigs). An annual ticket cost 50 thalers (150 marks).

Through the consent agreement concluded with the city of Charlottenburg, the company committed itself to introducing a 10-pfennig flat fare on Charlottenburg territory from 1 December 1897. On 1 January 1901, the 10-pfennig flat fare was introduced on the lines of the GBS and its subsidiaries. It applied to journeys within the respective municipal Weichbild and beyond to the terminus of the line used. Within the municipalities of Charlottenburg and Deutsch-Wilmersdorf, a transfer fare of 10 and 15 pfennigs also applied to the BCS lines. For journeys between the traffic areas, i.e., the networks of the individual companies, these charged a graded fare of up to 20 pfennigs with partial fares of 15 and 10 pfennigs if necessary. It applied to lines O, P, Q, R, S, and W, while the internal fare of 10 pfennigs applied to lines N, T, and U.

With the introduction of the flat fare, the GBS and its subsidiaries issued line-specific season tickets. These were issued for one or more lines but entitled the use of all lines operating in the affected relation. The fare was six marks for one line, two marks additional for each further line, up to a maximum of 15 marks total. After a first price increase in 1904, the price was seven marks for one line, ten marks for two lines, 13 marks for three lines, and 15 marks for the entire line network. A monthly ticket for the traffic area of all companies cost 30 marks. With the introduction of the ticket tax, the fares increased slightly again in 1906. For internal traffic in Charlottenburg, the company issued additional monthly tickets until the end of 1910 at three marks for one and one mark additional for each further line. For comparison: in 1909, the average annual income of a GBS employee (driver or conductor) was 1,400 marks (≈10008 euros).

Student season tickets for students under 16 years cost three marks per month and entitled the use of two lines for journeys between home and school, sports club or tutoring. For each further line to be used, a surcharge of one mark each applied. The company did not issue worker weekly tickets. Children under six years traveled free if they did not claim a separate seat. For two children under six years, the fare for one person was to be paid. The carriage of lap or hunting dogs – the latter only permitted on special routes – cost ten pfennigs.

== Operations ==
=== Vehicles ===
In its opening year, the BPfE recorded 18 horse tram cars and 130 horses in its inventory. Cars 1–6 and 17 were double-horse double-decker open-top cars, cars 7–10 were regular double-horse cars, and the remaining cars were single-horse cars. Cars 11–13 were also equipped with a saloon. In 1886/87, all cars were rebuilt as open-top cars. With the further expansion of the network, the BPfE procured additional cars from various manufacturers. From 1892, the BPfE deployed summer cars with open side walls specifically for excursion traffic. By 1895, the inventory had risen to 101 cars, including ten open single-horse cars (summer cars), ten closed double-horse cars, 47 closed single-horse cars, and 34 open-top cars. The company continued to use part of the cars as trailers after the decision to electrify. The open-top cars were rebuilt into single-deck cars. The summer cars were enclosed during the First World War, allowing year-round operation. The last horse tram cars were retired by the Berlin Tramway in the 1920s.

For the electric trial operation of 1882/83, single-horse cars 36 and 38 were used. The connecting cables between the current collectors and the cars were attached at one end of the car. The cars were rebuilt after the end of the trial operation. After the widespread electrification with overhead lines, the two vehicles were again in service as motor cars until their retirement in 1920.

The accumulator operation comprised 34 motor cars, which the company procured between 1895 and 1897. Four motor cars (Tw 24^{II}, 32^{II}, 133, 134) originated from former horse tram cars. Two further motor cars (Tw 290 and 150) were individual examples. Motor car 150 later received the number 291. After the conversion to overhead line operation, the motor cars were rebuilt, and the former horse tram cars were converted to trailers or retired.

The remaining motor cars were grouped into a series of 29 vehicles. They had two two-axle bogies and seven side windows in the arrangement wide–narrow–wide–narrow–wide–narrow–wide. The use of bogies was due to the high weight of the accumulators. In 1899, the vehicles were equipped with two pantograph current collectors each; in 1901, they were converted to roller current collectors, and in the following year, the accumulators were removed. Instead, the cars were now equipped with a contact shoe for underground line operation. Between 1905 and 1907, eleven motor cars received maximum bogies and enlarged platforms after rebuilding. The remaining 18 motor cars were retired by the BCS by 1913 and replaced by the same number of maximum motor cars. Motor car 221 had to be retired after an accident; the remaining vehicles passed to the BSt inventory in 1920. The motor cars rebuilt in 1905/07 were retired by the Berlin Tramway by 1929. Of the motor cars built in 1913, five were again equipped in 1925 with closed platforms of the Berlin standard design. While the open cars operated until 1936, three of the five rebuilt cars (from 1934 as type TD or TD 07/25) remained after the Second World War. BVG-West retired its two motor cars in 1955; the motor car remaining in East Berlin was incorporated by BVG-Ost into the Reko program in 1969.

The electric mixed operation with overhead lines and accumulators required the ordering of further vehicles. In 1898, the BCS ordered 60 two-axle motor cars from Dessauer Waggonfabrik. Current collection was to be via sliding bows according to the Siemens system. Delivery extended from August 1, 1899, to October 1, 1901. The Akkumulatorenfabrik Berlin-Hagen and Siemens & Halske were presumably responsible for the electrical equipment. The car bodies initially rested on pressed sheet metal frames. In 1902, the accumulators were removed. Since the Physikalisch-Technische Bundesanstalt feared interference from stray currents, a second overhead line was strung as a return conductor in Marchstraße. Initially, 15 motor cars received two additional roller current collectors, which, unlike the first, were not rotatable. With the expansion of traffic, the BCS rebuilt further vehicles. The double overhead line was strung over a length of 1.19 kilometers until the First World War. In addition to this measure, the motor cars underwent further extensive rebuilds. In 1902, conversion to roller current collectors and replacement of the controllers with models from the Union-Elektricitäts-Gesellschaft followed. The old 12-hp traction motors were replaced by 15-hp motors. Further measures included changing the coupling from trumpet coupling to funnel coupling or adapting the paint scheme to the GBS color scheme with fir-green side walls. In 1903, the cars also received new Neu-Berolina design frames. The cars were in passenger service with the Berlin Tramway until the 1920s. Some of the cars later served as work cars.

Also in 1902, the BCS procured another 15 Berolina motor cars. The vehicles were similar to the Berolina motor cars of the GBS. The vehicles were taken over by the Berlin Tramway in 1920 and retired by 1929. One motor car served after retirement as auxiliary equipment car H11.

Horse tram car 1 from the opening year 1865 is preserved as a historic vehicle. The car has been stored since 1993 in the Monument Hall of the German Museum of Technology and is the oldest surviving tram car in Europe. In June 2023, the car was moved to the museum's historic locomotive sheds. It is to become part of the new permanent exhibition on rail transport there. Trailer 147 was last presented under number 1688 in the condition of the 1930s. The vehicle was scrapped in 2016.

The following table provides an overview of the vehicles used by the Berlin Horse Railway and Berlin-Charlottenburg Tramway. Sorting is numerical by car number. Since the company retired most horse tram cars after electrification around the turn of the century, only the car numbers that were converted for electric operation are considered in the second column. Parenthesized numbers indicate that a horse tram car or trailer was used as a motor car or vice versa. Renumberings that took place after 1920 are not considered, except for the numbers of known work cars. Vehicles that only temporarily operated on the network, such as during the first trials with steam or accumulator motor cars, are not listed.

Vehicle overview
| Pfw | Tw / Bw | Car no. (from 1920) | Manufacturer (mech. / el.) | Year built | Notes |
Horse tram cars (Pfw) / trailers (Bw)
| 1–6, 17 | 5 | 453 | Lauenstein | 1865 | Open-top cars; Bw 1 later preserved as museum car; Bw 5 retired 1926; others retired after 1900 |
| 7–10 | 7, 10 | 454+455 | Lauenstein | 1865 | Double-horse cars, rebuilt 1886/87 to open-top cars, Pfw 10 with modified window arrangement; Bw 7 retired 1924; Bw 10 retired 1926 others retired after 1900 |
| 11–16, 18 | 11, 13, 18 | 456+457 | Lauenstein | 1865 | Single-horse cars, Pfw 11–13 with saloon; rebuilt 1887 to open-top cars; Bw 11, 13, 18 retired 1926; others retired after 1900 |
| 14^{II}–16^{II} | – | – | | 1896 | Single-horse cars; retired 1900 |
| 19+20 | – | – | Grums | 1872 | Open-top cars; retired after 1900 |
| 21–26 | 21–23, 25+26 | 10–14 | | 1872 | Single-horse cars; Pfw 24 retired before 1896; others retired by 1926 |
| 24^{II} | (24^{II}) | – | | 1896 | Single-horse car; rebuilt 1896 for electric accumulator operation; retired around 1900 |
| 27+28 | 27 | 15 | Grums | 1872 | Open-top cars; 1924 converted to goods wagon G75, fate unknown |
| 29–35 | 31, 35 | 16 | Grums | 1873 | Open-top cars; Pfw retired 1900; Bw 35 retired 1920; others retired 1928 |
| 32^{II} | (32^{II}) | 459 | | 1896 | Single-horse car; rebuilt 1896 for electric accumulator operation; rebuilt 1900 to Bw; retired 1925 |
| 36–46 | (36, 38) | – | Stephenson | 1875 | Single-horse cars; Pfw 36, 38 rebuilt 1882/83 for electric trial operation, rebuilt 1900 for electric operation; others retired 1900 |
| 36^{II}+37^{II} | – | – | | 1896 | Single-horse cars (?) |
| 47–49 | – | – | Grums | 1876 | Open-top cars; retired around 1900 |
| 50–55 | – | – | Stephenson | 1879 | Single-horse cars; retired 1900 |
| 50^{II} | – | – | Stephenson | 1896 | Single-horse car; retired 1900 |
| 56–60 | – | – | Wöhlert | 1880 | Open-top cars; retired 1900 |
| 61–73 | – | – | Noell | 1881–1883 | Single-horse cars; retired 1900 |
| 74–77 | 74–77 | 460–463 | Wöhlert | 1883 | Open-top cars; 1886 ex NBPf Pfw 86–89; retired 1925/28 |
| 78–89 | – | – | Noell | 1887–1889 | Single-horse cars; retired 1900 |
| 90–96 | – | – | | 1890 | Single-horse cars; retired 1900 |
| 97–99 | 97–99 | 621–623 | | 1892 | Single-horse cars, summer cars; 1914 with closed side walls; retired 1926/28 |
| 100–104 | 100–104 | 624–627 | | 1893 | Single-horse cars, summer cars; 1914/18 with closed side walls, Bw 100 retired; others retired 1926/28 |
| 105–107 | 105–107 | 628–630 | | 1895 | Single-horse cars, summer cars; 1914/18 with closed side walls; retired 1926/28 |
| 108–113 | 108–113 | 631–636 | | 1895 | Single-horse cars, summer cars; 1914/18 with closed side walls; retired 1926 |
| 114–119 | 114–119 | 637–642 | | 1896 | Single-horse cars, summer cars; 1914/18 with closed side walls; retired 1924/26 |
| 120–127 | 120–127 | 643–650 | | 1896 | Single-horse cars, summer cars; 1914/18 with closed side walls; retired 1926/28 |
| 128–132 | 128–132 | 651–655 | | 1897 | Single-horse cars, summer cars; 1914/17 with closed side walls; retired 1926 |
| 133+134 | (133+134) | – | | 1898 | Single-horse cars; rebuilt 1898 for electric accumulator operation; retired 1900 |
| 135–139 | 135–139 | 464–468 | | 1899 | Single-horse cars; retired 1926/28 |
| 140–157 | 140–157 | 656–673 | | 1900 | Single-horse cars, summer cars; 1914/17 with closed side walls; retired 1925/33; Bw 1688 (ex BSt 663, ex BCS 147) historic vehicle until 2016, scrapped 2016 |
Motor cars (Tw)
| (24^{II}) | 24^{II} | – | | 1896 | Single-horse car; rebuilt 1896 for electric accumulator operation; retired around 1900 |
| (32^{II}) | 32^{II} | 459 | | 1896 | Single-horse car; rebuilt 1896 for electric accumulator operation; rebuilt 1900 to Bw; retired 1925 |
| (36+38) | 36+38 | – | Stephenson / S&H | 1875 | Single-horse cars; rebuilt 1882/83 for electric trial operation with double overhead line and slot tube line; retired before 1921 |
| (133+134) | 133+134 | – | | 1898 | Single-horse cars; rebuilt 1898 for electric accumulator operation; retired 1900 |
| | 201–229 | 4721–4730 | Dessau / S&H | 1897 | Accumulator motor cars; rebuilt 1905/07 for overhead line operation; Tw 201, 202, 204, 207, 212, 213, 217, 220, 221, 225, 226 with new platforms, bogies and electrical equipment; Tw 203, 205, 206, 208–211, 214–216, 218, 219, 222–224, 227–229 retired by 1913; Tw 221 retired before 1920 |
| | 203^{II}, 205^{II}–206^{II}, 208^{II}–211^{II}, 214^{II}–216^{II}, 218^{II}–219^{II}, 222^{II}–224^{II}, 227^{II}–229^{II} | 5275–5292 | AEG | 1913 | Maximum motor cars; from 1925 partly with new closed platforms and new car no.; others retired by 1936 |
| | 230–289 | 3740–3799 | Dessau / S&H | 1899 | Pantograph collectors; later with roller collectors and Berolina frames; partly with additional collectors for return; retired 1929 |
| | 290 | 3800 | S&H | 1897 | Accumulator motor car; later rebuilt for pure overhead line operation; retired 1925 |
| | 291 | 3801 | S&H | 1895 | Accumulator motor car; ex Tw 150; later rebuilt for pure overhead line operation; retired 1925 |
| | 292–306 | 3802–3816 | AEG | 1902 | Berolina cars; Tw 292 before 1929 as auxiliary equipment car H11, fate unknown; others retired by 1929 |

=== Depots ===
==== Charlottenburg Depot ====
The first depot of the BPfE was located at the western end of the line at Spandauer Straße 13/14, corner Sophie-Charlotten-Straße. The depot opened simultaneously with the line in 1865. The wooden car barn, covered by a gable roof, measured 95 meters in length; the stable accommodated 128 horses. Additional facilities included a half-timbered residential building, a waiting hall, and a ticket office. In 1871, the depot was expanded with a two-story administration building. Four years later, a second car barn and a two-story stable were added. For 1876, two further stables, an office, a weighbridge, and a greenhouse are also mentioned. Until the change in traction, up to 100 cars and 300 horses were housed in the depot, with parking space designed for up to 124 cars. In 1900, the depot was rebuilt for electric operation and the parking area expanded for 187 cars; the workshop was relocated to the newly built Spreestraße depot. After the transition to the GBS and its successors, the depot was assigned number XVI or 16. With the commissioning of the new Charlottenburg Depot on Königin-Elisabeth-Straße, the old 1865 depot was closed. Until 1932, BVG used the area to park retired cars, and until 1935, it also served a forwarding company for parking its vehicles. Demolition occurred in 1935; the site has since been used for residential buildings.

==== Spreestraße Depot ====
In preparation for the upcoming conversion to electric accumulator operation, the BCS had a new depot built in 1896/97 according to plans by the S&H construction department. It covered the 8,442 square meter site at Spreestraße 59, Charlottenburger Ufer 20–24 and Havelstraße 10–12. Access was via Spree- and Havelstraße. The depot included two two-story car barns each, administration buildings, and a power plant for electricity generation and charging accumulators. The facades were clad with facing bricks. The barns were covered by gable roofs, with the intermediate ceilings designed as barrel vaults. The larger car barn on Havelstraße had eleven parking tracks for 40 cars on the ground floor. The smaller barn on Spreestraße had five tracks per floor for a total of ten motor cars and five trailers. Between the two barns was a transfer table, combined with a car elevator. The workshops were also located in the car barns. On July 1, 1906, the BCS gave up its own workshop. It henceforth had its vehicles maintained in the GBS workshops against reimbursement of prime costs. The now unnecessary power plant was already decommissioned in 1921. The gradual decommissioning of the barns began in 1926 in view of the planned new Charlottenburg Depot on Königin-Elisabeth-Straße. The barns subsequently served various purposes. Among other things, the Charlottenburg district office used them as a "House of Sports". The site was divided in the 1950s. In the 1970s, a fire damaged the larger car barn, which was then rebuilt. In spring 2019, the large barn on Arcostraße was demolished and the remaining track remnants at the depot entrance removed to make way for residential development planned on the site since 2014. The smaller barn on Wintersteinstraße remains.

==== Car barns ====
In addition to the two depots, the BPfE or BCS had two car barns. The Zoologischer Garten car barn was located on land leased from the zoo near the Lichtenstein Bridge; the exact location is unknown. It was designed for about ten to twelve cars and 50 horses. It opened with the line on July 3, 1875, and was in use until the cessation of horse tram operation in February 1901. Around the turn of the century, the BCS rented a shed on the grounds of the eponymous pub at Spandauer Bock to park retired horse tram cars. The site was south of Spandauer Chaussee. After the sale of the cars, the shed was returned to the owner.

== Bibliography ==
- Autorenkollektiv (1987). Straßenbahn Archiv 5. Berlin und Umgebung [Tram Archive 5. Berlin and Surroundings]. Berlin: transpress VEB Verlag für Verkehrswesen. pp. 251–273. ISBN 3-344-00172-8.
- Michael Kochems (2013). Straßen- und Stadtbahnen in Deutschland [Trams and Light Rail in Germany]. Vol. Band 14: Berlin – Teil 2. Straßenbahn, O-Bus. Freiburg im Breisgau: EK-Verlag. pp. 16–19. ISBN 978-3-88255-395-6.
- Michael Kochems (2013). Straßen- und Stadtbahnen in Deutschland [Trams and Light Rail in Germany]. Vol. Band 14: Berlin – Teil 2. Straßenbahn, O-Bus. Freiburg im Breisgau: EK-Verlag. pp. 204–229. ISBN 978-3-88255-395-6.
- Autorenkollektiv (1987). Straßenbahn Archiv 5. Berlin und Umgebung [Tram Archive 5. Berlin and Surroundings]. Berlin: transpress VEB Verlag für Verkehrswesen. pp. 18–19. ISBN 3-344-00172-8.
- Autorenkollektiv (1987). Straßenbahn Archiv 5. Berlin und Umgebung [Tram Archive 5. Berlin and Surroundings]. Berlin: transpress VEB Verlag für Verkehrswesen. pp. 27–29. ISBN 3-344-00172-8.
- Michael Kochems (2013). Straßen- und Stadtbahnen in Deutschland [Trams and Light Rail in Germany]. Vol. Band 14: Berlin – Teil 2. Straßenbahn, O-Bus. Freiburg im Breisgau: EK-Verlag. pp. 19–21. ISBN 978-3-88255-395-6.
- Siegfried Münzinger (1969). "Die Betriebshöfe der Berliner Straßenbahnen" [The Depots of the Berlin Trams]. Berliner Verkehrsblätter (6): 89–103.
- Die Berlin-Charlottenburger Straßenbahn [The Berlin-Charlottenburg Tramway]. pp. 15–21.
- "Beiwagen 1688 der Berliner Straßenbahn" [Trailer 1688 of the Berlin Tramway]. Denkmalpflege-Verein Nahverkehr Berlin. January 25, 2010. Archived from the original on January 2, 2014.
- Berlin-Charlottenburg Straßeneisenbahn. In: Polytechnisches Centralblatt. 1865. New series vol. 19, columns 158–161; Google Books
- Arbeitskreis Berliner Nahverkehr e. V. (Ed.): Berliner Verkehrsblätter. ISSN 0722-9399 (various years).
- Verkehrsgeschichtliche Blätter e. V. (Ed.): Verkehrsgeschichtliche Blätter. ISSN 0232-9042 (various years).
- Autorenkollektiv: Straßenbahn-Archiv 5. Berlin und Umgebung. transpress VEB Verlag für Verkehrswesen, Berlin 1987, ISBN 3-344-00172-8.
- Michael Kochems: Straßen- und Stadtbahnen in Deutschland. Volume 14: Berlin – Part 2. Tram, trolleybus. EK-Verlag, Freiburg im Breisgau 2013, ISBN 978-3-88255-395-6.
- Christian Winck: Die Straßenbahn im Bezirk Charlottenburg-Wilmersdorf. VBN Verlag B. Neddermeyer, Berlin 2015, ISBN 978-3-933254-30-6.
