= Flussbad Berlin =

Coordinates: 52.5121°N 13.4073°E

Flussbad Berlin is a project that aims to transform the Spreekanal in the downtown Berlin district of Mitte. The idea is to filter the water entering the canal in an ecological manner and have it flow into a "Flussbad" or river pool further downstream. The project was conceived by a group of architects and artists known as "realities:united", and it began receiving support from Germany's Federal Ministry for the Environment as part of their "National Urban Development Projects" programme and Berlin's Senate Department for Urban Development and the Environment in 2014. Since 2012, the non-profit association known as "Flussbad Berlin”, manages the project and fosters its realization. The Flussbad Berlin endeavour has enjoyed increasing popularity and publicity over the past several years and continues to be part of an open discussion involving growing media coverage and ever-broadening public participation.

== Location ==
The 1.8 km (1.1 mi) Spree Canal branches off the main Spree River at the Fischerinsel (Fisher Island) and heads southwest. It curves back to head northwest shortly before the Gertrauden Bridge, and then re-enters the main Spree River at the Bode Museum. The Spree Canal wraps around one side of the UNESCO World Heritage Site known as the Museum Island, while the main Spree River wraps around the other side. One of the last historical uses of the Spree Canal was as a river pool not far from the Berlin City Palace; however, that bathing area was closed in 1925 for hygienic reasons. Since then, open access to the water at any point along the Spree Canal has been prohibited.

== Spree Canal water quality ==
Today, as part of the Spree River water system, the Spree Canal functions as the endpoint of a number of different wastewater discharges. The most severe pollution occurs when Berlin's combined sewage system overflows, which happens roughly 20 to 30 times per year during periods of heavy rain. When this occurs, the amount of water that flows into the overall system exceeds the capacity of Berlin's sewer pipes; as a result, the contents of the sewer system – which includes all forms of faecal matter, rinsing residues and sanitary products from Berlin households – are pumped untreated into the river. It takes many days for the river to recover from this massive contamination. And yet, without these regular overflows of the sewer system, the Spree River would most likely be clean enough to swim in. One case in point: as it makes its way towards downtown Berlin, the Spree River runs through the Müggelsee, a lake located near the city but just before the sewage overflow sites and whose water quality is generally high. In fact, when a certain number of days have passed after the most recent overflow of the sewer system in inner-city Berlin, the overall water quality of the Spree Canal returns to a level that is actually quite good – it can even have a visibility depth of up to 2.5 metres.

== Project ==
The "Flussbad Berlin" project has a number of different goals and concerns: these include cleaning up the river, facilitating access to the water, creating an attractive, non-commercial public space in the middle of the city, harnessing and utilising the unused Spree Canal and designing an ecological water environment in the area around the Fischerinsel. The team working on the project foresees creating three distinct sections in the canal:

In the upper section of the canal – between the Inselbrücke and the Gertraudenbrücke – the Flussbad project would transform the water into a more natural state. Some of the concrete canal walls would be removed in order to generate a "softer" embankment. A type of "resting place" for aquatic life would be set up here along the 1.8 km (1.1 mi) canal. This would help restore the entire ecological balance of the Spree River.

Another goal is to give pedestrians direct access to the water. In the area around the section of the canal known as the Friedrichsgracht, a 300 m (980 ft) long plant filter would serve to clean the water. Here, the water would flow through 80 centimetres of gravel sediment into a drainage layer lying underneath; after that, the purified water would flow toward the swimming area. The actual swimming area would lie between the Schleusenbrücke and the Monbijoubrücke, i.e. in the section of the Spree Canal between the upcoming Humboldt Forum and the Bode Museum. At two points here – at the Lustgarten and at the Humboldt Forum – descending stairs along the riverbank would give visitors direct access to the Spree, whether to swim or just enjoy the view.

At the northern tip of Museum Island, a new end-weir would separate the clean-water area of the canal from the regular main flow of the Spree River. The idea behind creating an actual swimming area in the canal is to showcase the improved water quality of the Spree River in this area and thus to serve as a role-model project for the effective and ecological handling of natural resources in the city.

The largest technical challenge facing the Flussbad comes in the form of the raw-sewage overflow pumped into the Spree Canal by the combined sewage system during heavy rain. Although these heavily polluting discharges would be cleaned by the plant filter in the Friedrichsgracht area before reaching the bathing area further downstream, there remains the problem of one especially large overflow pipe located near the Schleusenbrücke, which is directly in the planned swimming area. In order to get this liability under control, the Flussbad team intends to build a control structure into the sewage pipe that would retain the wastewater accumulated there and, after the rain stopped, slowly funnel it back to the sewage treatment plants. This would prevent the wastewater from entering the swimming area.

In 2014, the Flussbad Association used funding from the LOTTO Foundation Berlin to carry out a feasibility study, which was subsequently published in 2015. In that study, both the water purification system proposed by the Flussbad as well as the use of the Spree Canal as a so-called "river pool" were deemed feasible by independent scientists.

== The "Flussbad Berlin" Association ==
The non-profit Flussbad Berlin Association (Flussbad Berlin e.V.) was founded in December 2012. In November 2014, the association received €4 million funding from the Berlin and German governments as part of the "National Urban Development Projects" programme. The idea behind these funds is to enable the Flussbad Association to manage the ongoing development of the project and generate even more political consensus by 2018. In February 2015, the association set up a management office, which now has a staff of seven employees. In December 2015, the association published its first Annual Review, which provided a comprehensive description and presentation of the project.

== Awards and funding ==
- 2011 Holcim Award Europe (Gold), endowed with $100,000 US
- 2012 Holcim Award Global (Bronze), endowed with $50.000 US
- 2014 Funding from the LOTTO Foundation Berlin for the commissioning of a more in-depth design draft and a certified hydrologic report (€110,000)
- 2014 Flussbad becomes an official "National Urban Development Project", with €2.6 million in funding from the Federal Ministry for Environment, Nature Conservation, Building and Atomic Security and a further €1.4 million in financial backing from the Berlin Senate Department for Urban Development and the Environment.

== Debate ==
Ever since its inception, the Flussbad project has continually gained public attention and support. Especially since receiving government funding in 2014, the project has been discussed widely in the public sphere, with various voices speaking out in newspaper and magazine articles. For example, in May 2015, Lothar Müller pointed out in the Süddeutsche Zeitung that several basic organisational matters would have to be settled before the project was realised. In that same month, Ricardo Tarli argued in the Neue Zürcher Zeitung that the project was the expression of a changed Zeitgeist: "The Flussbad expresses the lifestyle of an active and environmentally conscious generation for whom a clean river is more important than owning a car. Their credo is: Let's bring nature back into the city". There was also wide press coverage of the "1st Berlin Flussbad Cup", a swimming competition with roughly 80 participants in the planned swimming area along Museum Island. Organised by the Flussbad Berlin Association, the event took place on 12 July 2015 and was covered extensively both during the lead-up to the race and after. While Germany's Die Zeit newspaper called the project "genius" and "spectacular" and the Süddeutsche called on Berlin to "take the jump into the cold water", Hermann Parzinger, President of the Prussian Cultural Heritage Foundation, wrote in a guest editorial in the Tagesspiegel about his concerns that the Flussbad would create an unappealing "party zone". Tim Edler, one of the project's founders, responded by arguing that there was "no causal relationship between swimming and partying". The international reception of the project has been overwhelmingly positive; the Flussbad was described as emblematic of Berlin as a modern, future-oriented capital by Michael Kimmelman in the New York Times and Max Kutner in Newsweek.

The fact that the Spree Canal is officially listed as a Federal Waterway (Bundeswasserstraße) has caused some speculation that the Flussbad might come into conflict with existing laws. However, the Berlin Waterways and Shipping Office (Wasser- und Schifffahrtsamt Berlin) announced in 2015: "After a preliminary legal examination, we have determined that the realisation of the Flussbad project would not in any way hinder the interests of shipping in the Spree Canal". They nevertheless noted that precise details would only be available after the planning had undergone more concrete progress. In 2015, Klaus Töpfer, a former German Federal Minister of the Environment, commented on the issue by arguing that "it should indeed be possible to devote this section of the Spree to a different use". One further conflict point is the fact that the landing pier of the water-taxi company known as Berliner Wassertaxi Stadtrundfahrten is located in the Spree Canal. In contrast, the functioning of the existing sport-boat pier in the southern area would not be affected by the Flussbad. Even today, the pier is accessible only from the east, because the passageway north is blocked by a weir at the Foreign Office.

== Historical "river pools" in Berlin ==
- River pool at the Schlossfreiheit, officially referred to as the "Badeanstalt hinter den Werderschen Mühlen" ("Bathhouse behind the Werder Mills")
- River pool at the Waisenbrücke (Bridge)
- Städtisches Flussbad Lichtenberg (Lichtenberg River Pool)

== Similar projects ==
The Flussbad Berlin project forms part of an international movement to revitalise inner-city rivers. Similar projects exist in the following cities:

- Boston: Charles River Swimming Club
- Brügge: Canal Swimmer’s Club at Triennale 2015
- Chicago: Wild Mile
- London: Thamesbaths
- Los Angeles: Revitalisation of the Los Angeles River
- München: Isarlust
- New York: +POOL
- Paris: New waterside landscape along the Seine
