= Am Kupfergraben =

Street in Berlin, Germany

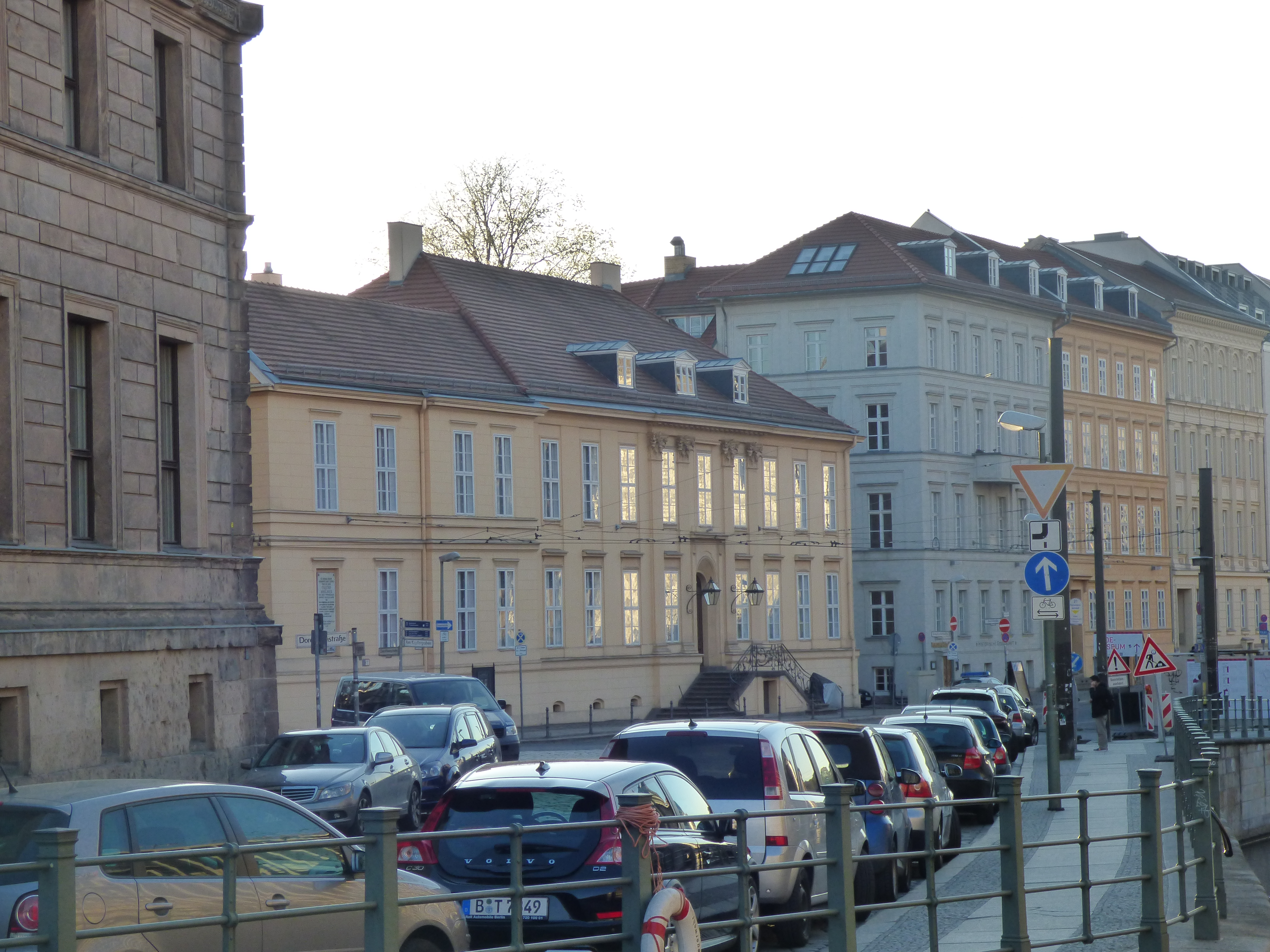
- Am Kupfergraben in 2016
- Interactive map of Am Kupfergraben
- Former names: Am Ludwigsgraben; (16th century–c. 1700)
- Namesake: Kupfergraben
- Type: Street
- Length: c. 500 m (1,600 ft)
- Location: Berlin, Germany
- Quarter: Mitte
- Nearest metro station: Friedrichstraße; Hackescher Markt; Museumsinsel
- Coordinates: 52°31′16″N 13°23′40″E
- Northwest end: Am Weidendamm; Geschwister-Scholl-Straße; Ebert Bridge
- Major junctions: Georgenstraße; Bauhofstraße; Dorotheenstraße
- Southeast end: Hinter dem Gießhaus; Bodestraße; Am Zeughaus

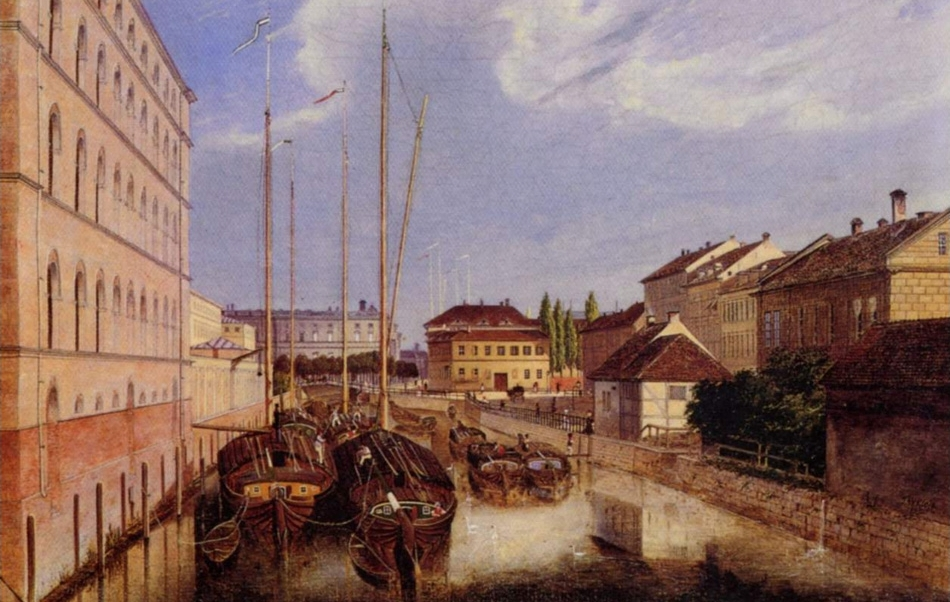
Am Kupfergraben, 1835

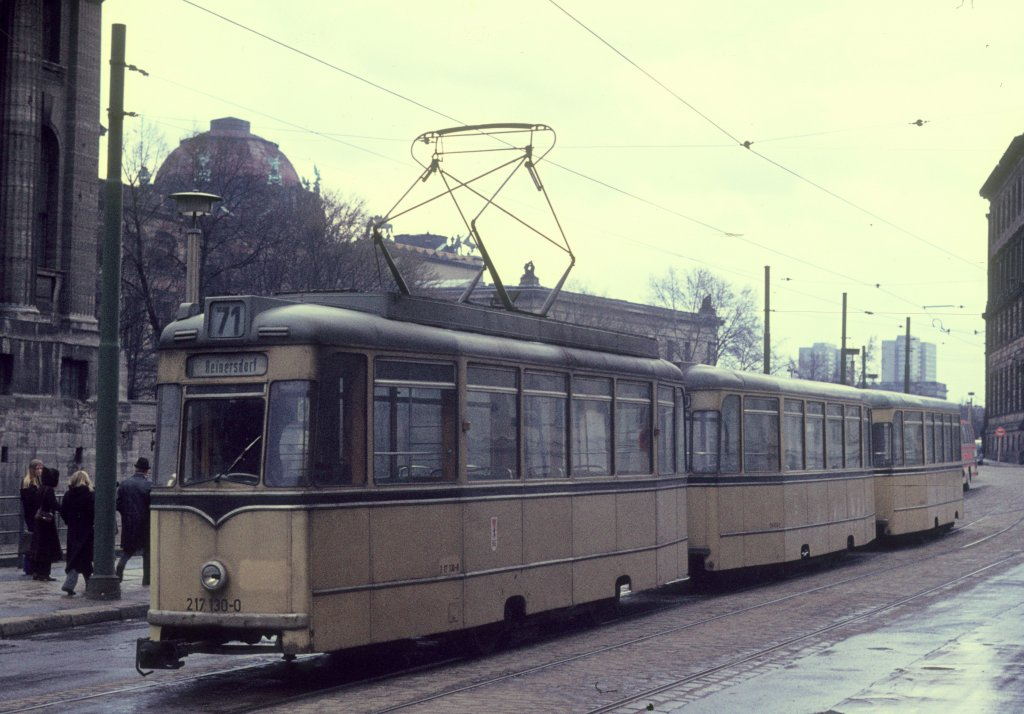
Tram line 71 in 1972

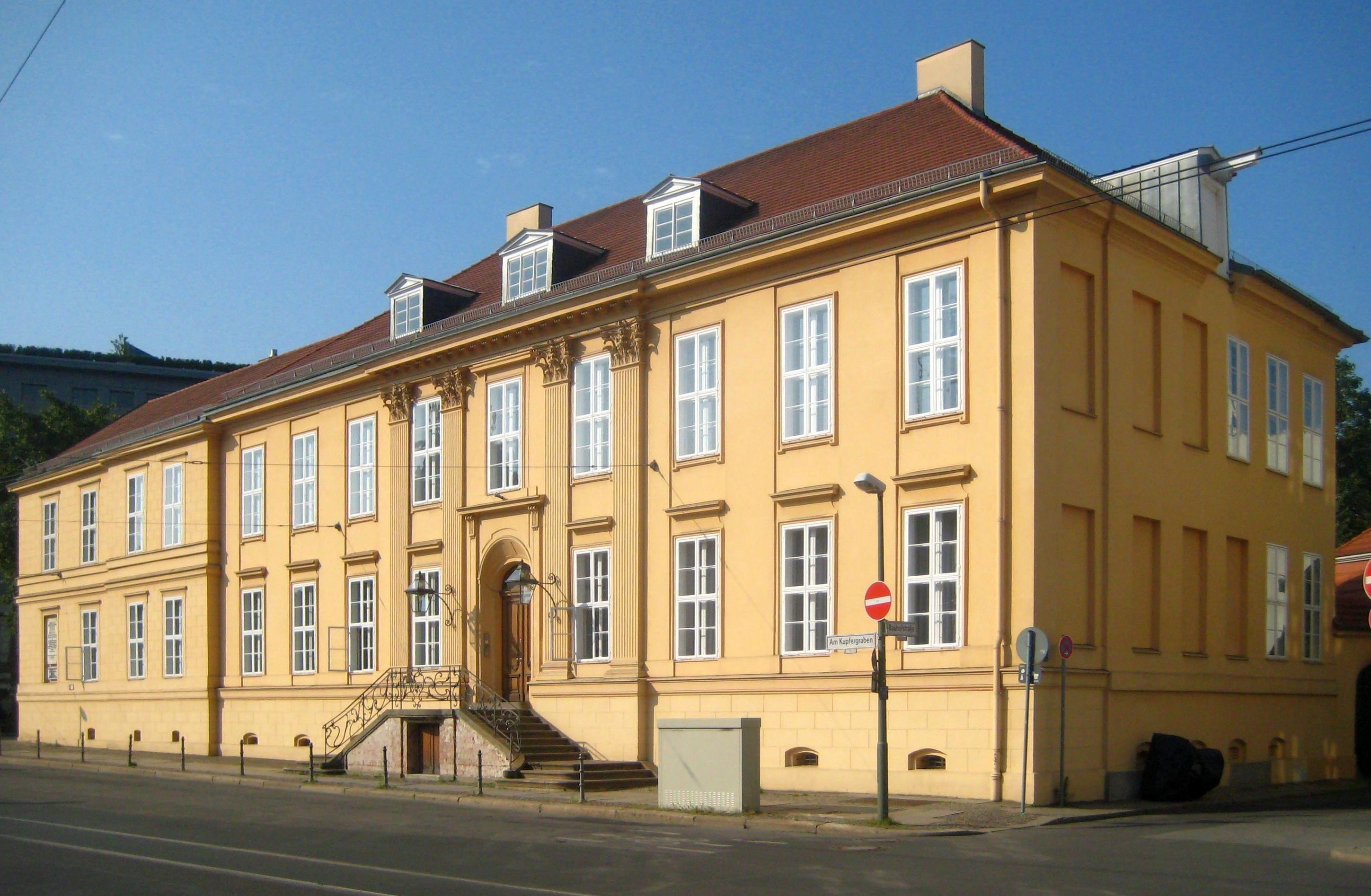
Magnus-Haus, Am Kupfergraben 7

Am Kupfergraben is the name of an almost 500-metre (1,600 ft) long street in the Berlin district Mitte of the borough of the same name. It is located in the historic Dorotheenstadt district.

== Position and course ==
Am Kupfergraben runs as a riverside road along the Kupfergraben, a section of the Spreekanal which gives the street its name, and the Spree between the streets Hinter dem Gießhaus and Geschwister-Scholl-Straße with the Ebertsbrücke. The Monbijou Bridge (Monbijoubrücke) and the Eiserne Bridge (Eiserne Brücke) connect the street Am Kupfergraben with the Museum Island (Museumsinsel).

== History ==
A first development Am Kupfergraben was already carried out around 1580, as a contemporary depiction shows: The Kupfergraben was called Ludwigsgraben for a while after its former owner, the Privy Councillor of State. The artillery barracks, completed in 1773 [No. 1-3], occupy the largest part of the street. Opposite the barracks on the Graben is the royal gunsmith's shop [No. 8]. (Ernst Fidicin)

However, most of the buildings were erected in the 18th century, after the regulation of the Spree arm, in the southern part of the street.

Am Kupfergraben has been used by trams since the 1930s, initially only as the terminus of line 75. Since 1997, tram lines M1 and 12 have been running on the street between Dorotheenstraße and Georgenstraße.

== Buildings and memorials ==
- The entrances to the Bode Museum and the Pergamon Museum, which can be reached via bridges, are located Am Kupfergraben.
- In the listed four-storey building Am Kupfergraben 6 there are or were (as of 2020) the residential and office rooms of well-known personalities. This is where the German Chancellor Angela Merkel lives with her husband, the chemistry professor Joachim Sauer. Until his death in early April 2013, the SPD politician Ottmar Schreiner also lived in the house. The house also housed the law office of Lothar de Maizière.
- Am Kupfergraben 7 is the Magnus House (Magnus-Haus), which is also a listed building (the place where the first Physical Society in Germany was founded in 1842), today the Berlin headquarters of the German Physical Society. In the 19th century, Carl Graf von Brühl, the General Director of the Berliner Museen, and the physicist and chemist Gustav Magnus were among the residents of the house. Some offices in the Magnus House were used by former German President Richard von Weizsäcker, and since 1999 by the Atlantik-Brücke, a lobbyist association whose members include leading figures from business, politics, the armed forces, science, the media, and culture who exert socio-political influence and maintain contacts through the joint network. In 2015, Siemens AG, which owns the Magnus-Haus, Am Kupfergraben 7, applied for a new building in the listed Palaisgarten to be erected as a company representative office and initially received a preliminary approval. After three years, the new building project was averted and the garden was retained in its full size.
- The barracks continued to be used for military purposes during the GDR era as Friedrich-Engels-Kaserne, and housed the NVA's Friedrich Engels Guard Regiment. At the end of the 1990s it was assigned to the Deutsches Historisches Museum and houses offices, warehouses and workshops. Since 2009, a new building has been under construction on its grounds under the name Museumshöfe.
- As house number 10, Heiner Bastian had a modern building constructed from 2003 to 2007 according to plans by David Chipperfield and operated an art gallery in it. The three-storey Bastian House with its unconventional arrangement of windows and large, light-flooded halls was officially donated by the Bastian family to the Prussian Cultural Heritage Foundation (Stiftung Preußischer Kulturbesitz) in October 2016, together with the exhibits already on display.

== Prominent personalities ==
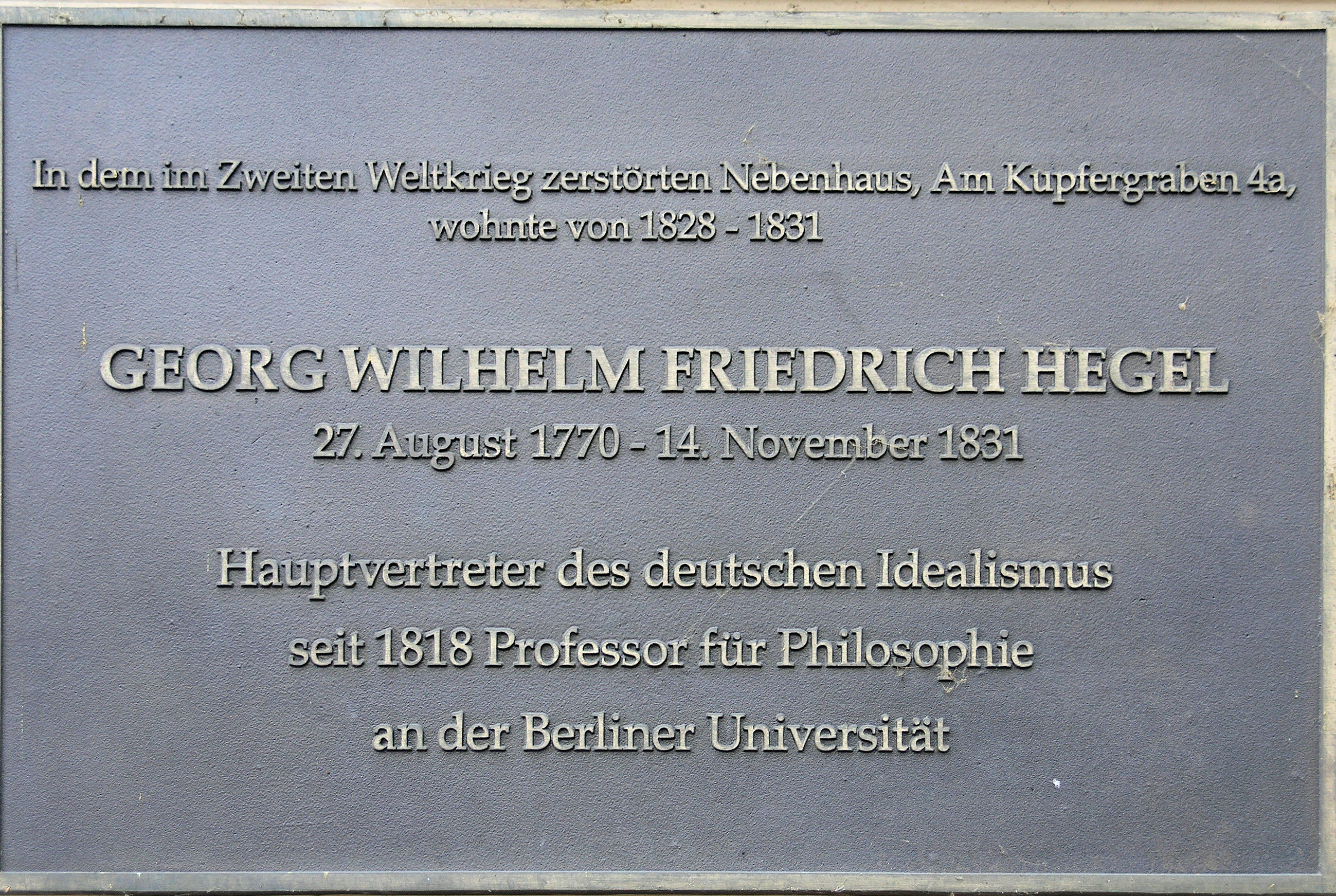
Memorial plaque for Georg Wilhelm Friedrich Hegel, Am Kupfergraben 4a

Georg Wilhelm Friedrich Hegel lived from 1819 to 1831 in the war-damaged house Am Kupfergraben 4a. A plaque commemorating Hegel is attached to the neighbouring house, Am Kupfergraben 5. By mistake, the number 5 is often mistaken for Hegel's house. This was the residence of the "Institute for Foreigners" of the Berlin University, which existed until 1945. In the GDR, the Institute for Musicology (Institut für Musikwissenschaft) of the Humboldt University of Berlin moved into the building. After a thorough renovation, the Department of Musicology (Seminar für Musikwissenschaft) has been located in number 5 again since 2003. In the years 1825/1826 the mathematician Niels Henrik Abel also lived in the house Am Kupfergraben 4a, where he spent a research-intensive period. In memory of Abel, a plaque has been attached to the new building which has been erected in the meantime since 2014.
