= Eiserne Bridge =

Eiserne Bridge Eiserne Brücke
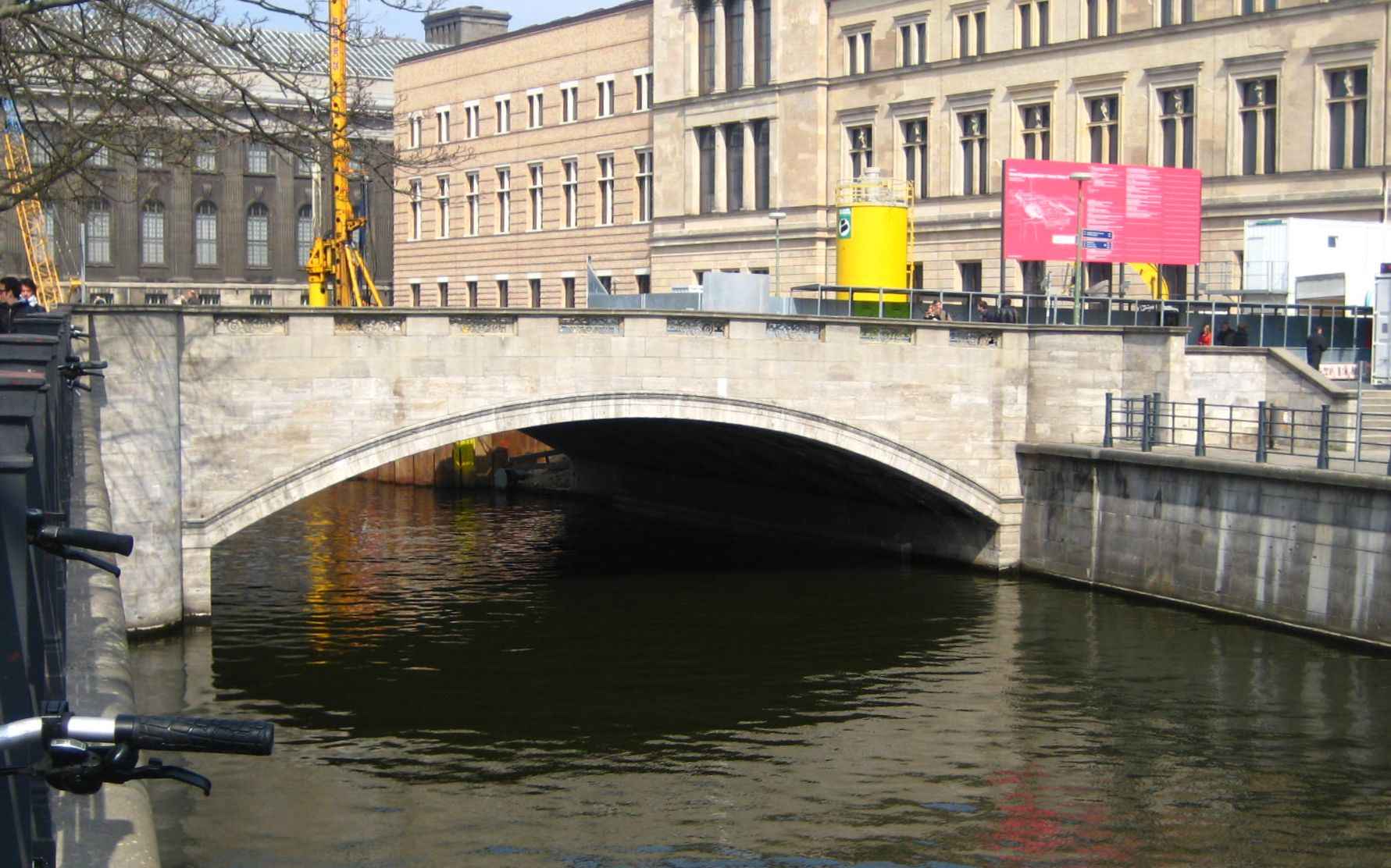
- The bridge in 2010
- Coordinates: 52°31′10″N 13°23′51″E
- Locale: Mitte, Berlin, Germany

Location
- Interactive map of Eiserne Bridge

Eiserne Bridge (German: Eiserne Brücke) is a bridge in Mitte, Berlin, Germany.

Constructed in the late 19th century as a way to cross the Spreekanal, the bridge has undergone several renovations in recent years, acting as a vital bridge in the centre of Berlin.The bridge sees daily traffic of approximately 4000 vehicles per day.
