= Volvo (disambiguation) =

Volvo (AB Volvo) is a Swedish manufacturing company.

Volvo may also refer to:

== Related or formerly related companies ==
- Volvo Cars (Volvo Car AB), separate from its former parent conglomerate
- Volvo Trucks, a division of Volvo
- Volvo Buses, a subsidiary of Volvo

== Other uses ==
- Ndaye Mulamba (1948–2019), nicknamed Volvo, an association footballer from Zaire
- "Volvo", a song by Eddie Meduza on his 1981 album Gasen I Botten

== See also ==
- Volva (disambiguation)
- Vulva (disambiguation)
- List of Volvo vehicles
- Volvo International, a former tennis tournament
- Volvo Masters, a former golf event
- Volvo Open, a golf tournament played in Sweden in 1970 and 1971
- Volvo Ocean Race, a yacht race 2001–2019
