= Wagin (disambiguation) =

Wagin is a town in Australia

Wagin may also refer to:

- Ben Wagin (1930–2021), German artist
- Electoral district of Wagin
- Shire of Wagin, local government area, Australia
- Wagin Lake

== See also ==
- Vagin
