= Vagina (disambiguation) =

The vagina is an internal sex organ in female mammals.

Vagina may also refer to:

== Anatomy ==
- The vagina of the portal vein.
- Vagina tendinis, the fibrous sheath around tendons:
  - Called a vagina fibrosa when solid
  - Called a vagina mucosa when it contains a fluid-filled cavity around the tendon
- Vagina bulbi, bulbar vagina, the sheath of the eyeball
- Vagina musculi recti abdominis, rectus sheath
- Vagina processus styloidei, sheath of styloid process

== Geography ==
- Vagina, Krasnoyarsk Krai, Russia
- Vagina, Kurgan Oblast, Russia
- Vagina, Tyumen Oblast, Russia
- Vagina (Strelnaya tributary), river in Kemerovo Oblast, Russia

== In music ==
- Vagina (album), album by Alaska Thunderfuck
- "Vagina" (song), song by Cupcakke

== Other ==
- Vagina (journal), an American lesbian magazine in the 1970s
- Vagina: A New Biography, a book by Naomi Wolf
- Vagina, feninine form of the Russian surname Vagin

== See also ==
- Vulva (disambiguation)
