= The Parliament of Trees =

Memorial

Coordinates: 52°31′17″N 13°22′39″E

Parliament of Trees
- Das Parlament der Bäume
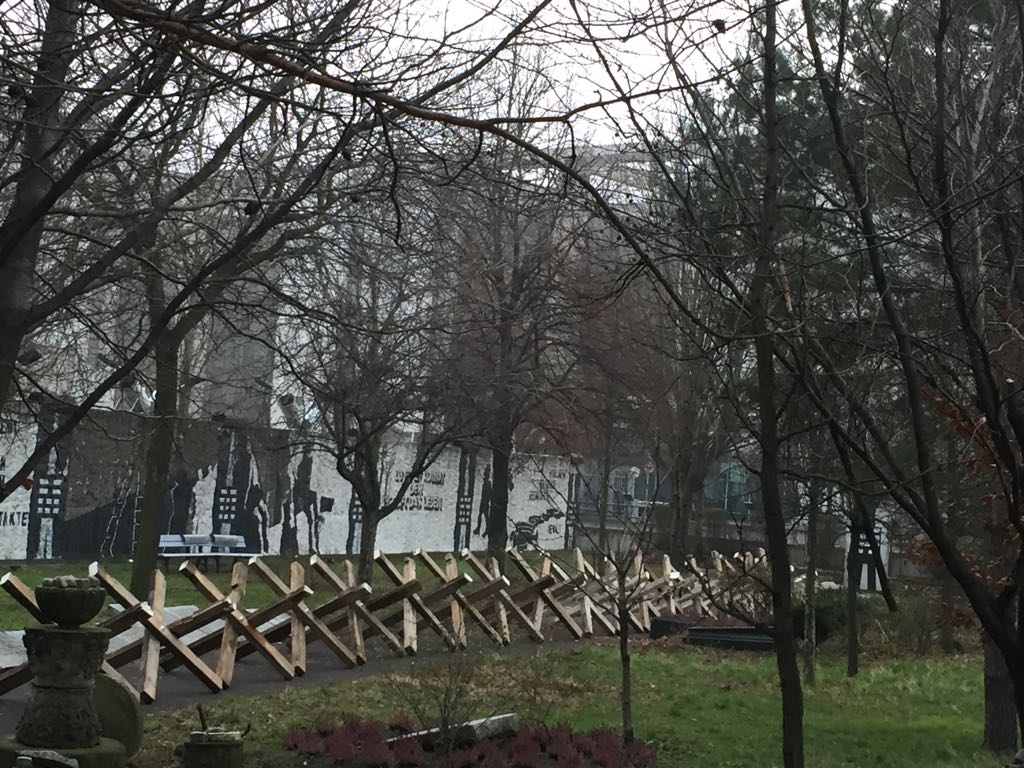
- The Parliament of Trees as seen from Schiffbauerdamm
- Interactive map of Parliament of Trees
- Location: Berlin, Germany

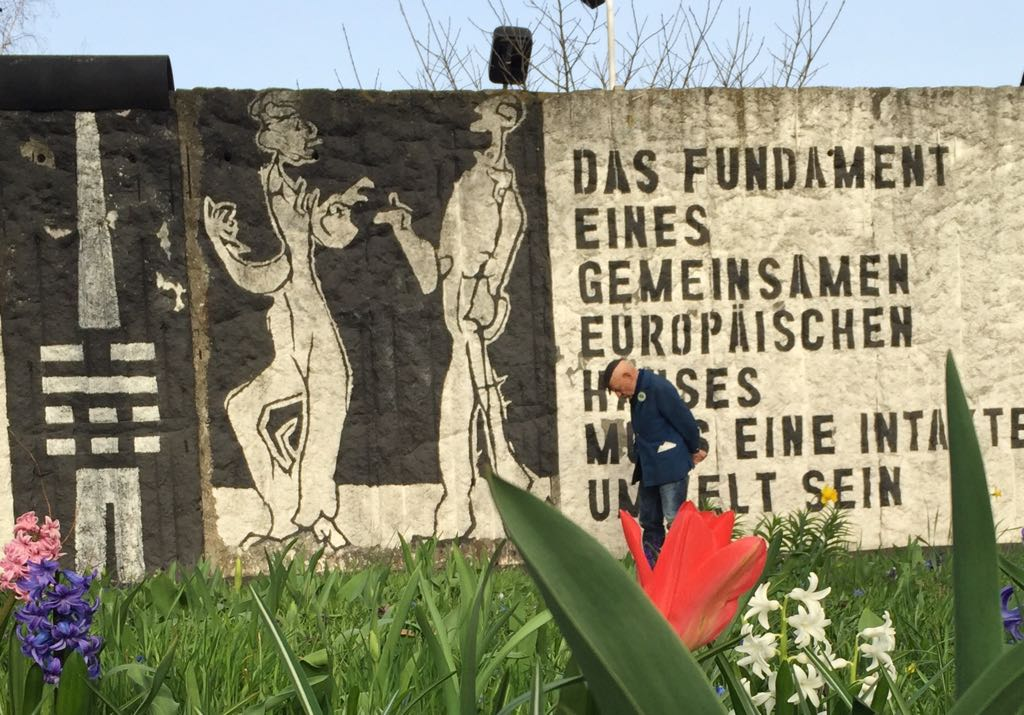
Ben Wagin at The Parliament of Trees

The Parliament of Trees (also known as The Parliament of Trees against war and violence) is a memorial for the death victims of the Berlin Wall, which was installed on 9 November 1990 by performance artist Ben Wagin.

== Installation ==
Wagin established the memorial on a site of the former death strip on the eastern shore of the Spree opposite to the German Parliament in Berlin-Mitte. There he arranged memorial stones, pictures, posters and pieces of the facilities that were used to defend the border. Different artists worked on these exhibition pieces. Also trees and flowers were planted. The background of the installation was formed by L-shaped pieces of the wall of the last generation of the wall on which the dates of the construction and the fall of the Berlin Wall were painted together with the number of the death victims from the respective years. Additionally other motives are on the backside of the walls. On 3 October 1997 Wagin lit 999 torches, which recreated the course of the Berlin Wall.

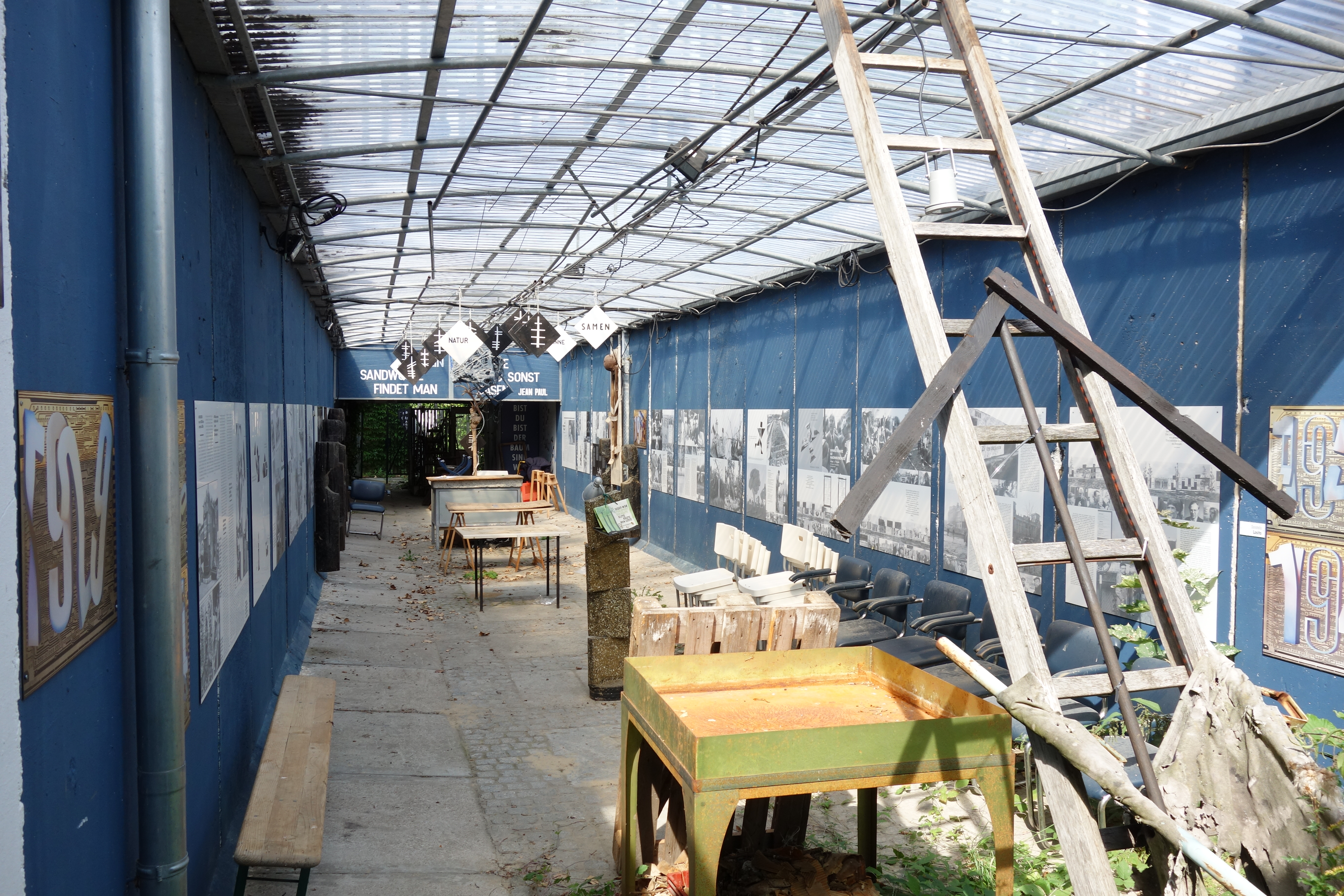
Part of the exhibition by various artists

== Modification ==
Because the German government moved from Bonn to Berlin many federal buildings were newly constructed next to the German Parliament in the belt of the federation (Band des Bundes). Part of this is the newly built Marie-Elisabeth-Lüders-Haus, which to some extent developed on the ground of The Parliament of Trees. The latter was therefore made smaller and trees were rearranged. In the building of the German Parliament a public installation made of pieces of the wall of The Parliament of Trees was established. The Parliament of Trees can be accessed through Schiffbauerdamm promenade.
