= Vulva (disambiguation) =

A vulva (pl. vulvas or vulvae) is the region containing external genital organs on female mammals.

Vulva may also refer to:

- Cyphopod, or vulva, an internal genital structure in female millipedes
- Vulva, the external opening of the female reproductive system in nematodes
- Vulva (band), an English techno duo

== See also ==
- Volva (disambiguation)
- Ulva (disambiguation)
- Vagina (disambiguation)
