= Lindentunnel =

Tunnel in Mitte, Berlin

Coordinates: 52.5174°N 13.3951°E

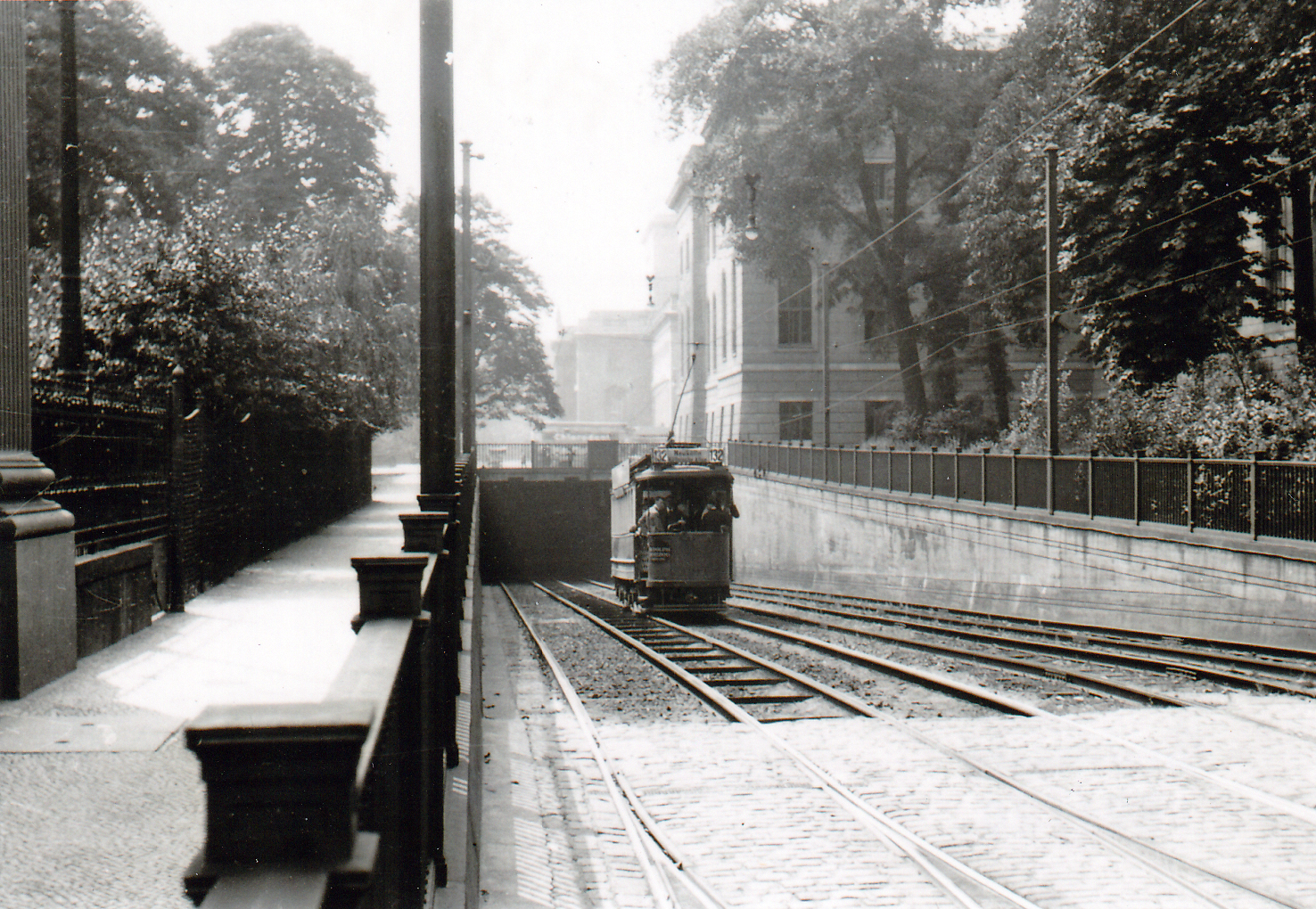
- Maximum railcar on line 132 entering the north ramp, 1929
- Interactive map of Lindentunnel

Overview
- Location: Berlin-Mitte
- System: Tramway tunnel

Operation
- Work began: August 6, 1914
- Opened: December 9, 1916 West tunnel: December 17, 1916 East tunnel: December 19, 1916
- Closed: West tunnel: November 9, 1923 East tunnel: September 2, 1951
- Owner: City of Berlin
- Traffic: up to 120 trains/h and direction

Technical
- Length: Incl. ramps: East tunnel: 354 m West tunnel: 389 m Tunnel construction: East tunnel: 123 m West tunnel 187 m

The Lindentunnel is a partially filled tunnel under the boulevard Unter den Linden in the Berlin district of Mitte. Built from 1914 and opened on December 17 and 19, 1916, the tunnel was used by the tramway as an underpass under the boulevard, replacing an at-grade crossing at the same location that had been put into operation in 1894. The tramway used the structure until 1951, after which it was used as a prop warehouse for the Berlin State Opera and as a parking lot for vehicles of the East German People's Police. After German reunification, performance artist Ben Wagin used parts of the tunnel as an exhibition space, while other parts have been used since the 1990s to store props for the Maxim Gorki Theater. Complete demolition of the tunnel is planned in the medium term.

== Previous history ==
=== Linden crossroads ===
The boulevard Unter den Linden was a special legal feature of Berlin's street network. The streets, squares and bridges built in Berlin before 1837 became the property of the city on January 1, 1876, according to the law of December 1875. Exceptions were made for the chaussee and the street Unter den Linden. In addition, the German Emperor and the Prussian King had the right to have the final say in matters of urban planning.

Founded in 1871, the Great Berlin Horse Railway (GBPfE) opened its first line from Rosenthaler Tor to Gesundbrunnen in 1873. Over the next few years, other lines followed from the former gates of the Akzisemauer to the suburbs. The individual lines were connected by a circle route, later known as Line 1 - Stadtring, which followed the approximate course of the Wall. It was the first north-south connection in Berlin. A second connection via Spandauer Strasse was opened in 1883. The 2.2 kilometer section between Spandauer Strasse and the Brandenburg Gate, where Unter den Linden is located, was left out. In 1875, the GBPfE made a first attempt to cross the Linden via Charlottenstrasse, which was rejected by the Berlin Police Commissioner due to the narrow width of the street.

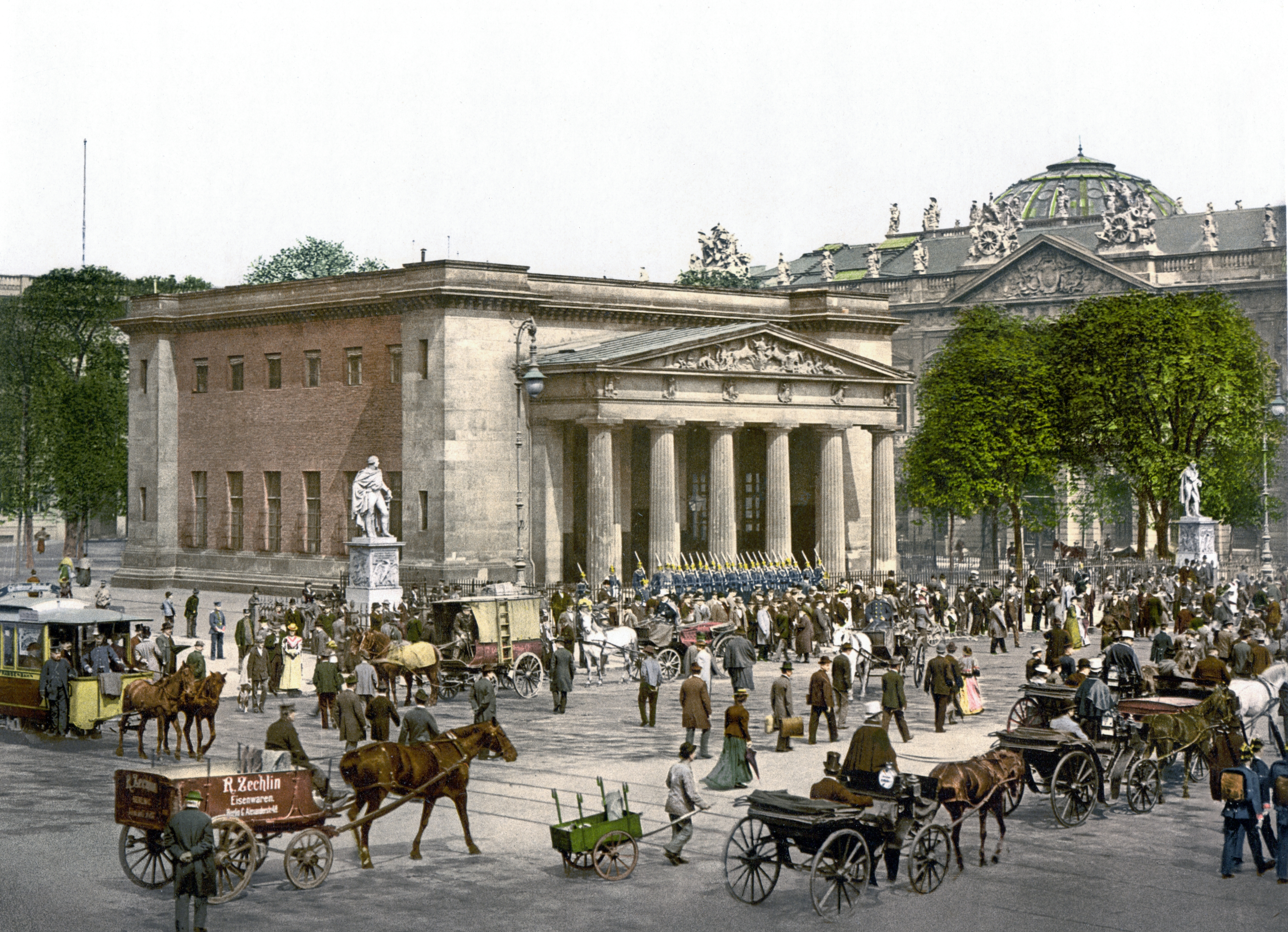
Linden crossing in front of the Neue Wache with a GBPfE horse-drawn carriage coming from the left, around 1900

From the 1880s on, the GBPfE concentrated on the further expansion of its network. Since the central north-south connection was still missing, the management of the horse-drawn railway, with the support of the Berlin magistrate, approached the police authorities again in 1885. The magistrate again rejected the project, suggesting instead a crossing at the level of the Schlossbrücke over Schinkelplatz and Am Kupfergraben. In 1888, the city submitted an immediate application to the Kaiser, pointing out the urgent need for a north-south tramway connection. It proposed that the line should run through Friedrichstrasse, which should be sufficiently widened between Behrenstrasse and Dorotheenstrasse. The Kaiser recognized the urgency of the project, but rejected the city's plan. There were further negotiations about the location of the intersection; the parties agreed on a connection at the level of Hinter der Katholischen Kirche, Platz am Opernhause (Note: 1910–1947: Kaiser-Franz-Joseph-Platz, since 1947: Bebelplatz) and Kastanienwäldchen (between the Palais des Prinzen Heinrich, Neue Wache and Sing-Akademie (Note: Since 1952: Maxim-Gorki-Theater)). The connection was put into operation on September 22, 1894.

The company paid a lump sum of one million marks to the city for the construction of the connection. This relieved the company of the cost of acquiring the land. The city, for its part, became embroiled in a 20-year legal dispute with the university, which owned the chestnut grove. The university demanded an annual rent of five percent of 1,526,800 marks for the use of the grove, which had been given to it by Frederick William III in 1810. This sum corresponded to the value of the land as building land. The city saw the chestnut grove only as a green space and wanted to reduce the price. The dispute ended with a settlement in 1914 under the rectorate of Max Planck. By that time, World War I had broken out and the construction of the Lindentunnel was a foregone conclusion. The city paid the university the sum of 1,069,250.86 marks (about 6.88 million euros in today's currency). By order of the Prussian Minister of Finance August Lentze, the university had to spend the money on a war bond.

In 1896, the GBPfE began electrifying its network, which was renamed the "Great Berlin Tramway"(GBS) in 1898. Electricity was supplied via overhead lines and roller pantographs. In prestigious locations, such as the Lindenkreuzung, overhead lines were prohibited for aesthetic reasons. The GBS therefore initially used accumulator railcars, and on October 7, 1901, equipped the Lindenkreuzung with an overhead line (slotted tube contact line). This type of power supply was not satisfactory, as the cable ducts quickly became clogged with leaves and slush, and the pantographs broke off at the slightest obstacle. In the winter of 1906/1907, the authorities ordered the installation of emergency overhead lines, which were replaced by permanent installations in 1907. Due to the enormous width of the roadway, the cables were stretched over a length of 60 meters at street level without intermediate suspension.

=== Tunnel plans of the Great Berlin Tramway and the City of Berlin ===
As the Linden crossing, opened in 1894, quickly reached its capacity, the city applied in vain for permission to build a second crossing on Charlottenstraße in 1897. The chief of police, however, proposed an extension of Kanonierstrasse (Note: Since 1951: Glinkastraße) to Neustädtische Kirchstrasse with a street opening between Behrenstrasse and Linden. The city then drew up plans to implement the proposal. In April 1901, however, Kaiser Wilhelm II prohibited any further above-ground crossing of the boulevard. He is said to have added the remark "No, will be made underground!" to the project documents, but the authenticity of this sentence cannot be verified. Alternatively, the emperor is said to have uttered the phrase " Under, not over", which, according to other sources, was also intended for the construction of a suspension railway based on the Wuppertal model. The period before the construction of the tunnel was characterized by a strong disagreement between the city of Berlin and the Great Berlin Tramway. The conflict was triggered by the extension of the concession period until December 31, 1949, requested by the GBS and approved by the Chief of Police on May 4, 1900. The concession agreement with the city, which regulated the use of the streets, expired on December 31, 1919. However, the GBS generally derived the right to operate the tramway beyond 1919 from the extension of the concession. Several legal disputes ensued, with one party winning and the other losing. Both sides went their own ways when it came to organizing the traffic. In 1900, the city decided to build its own tram lines, and both sides drew up different plans for the Lindenkreuzung intersection, including a tunnel under the street at the Opera House. The morning edition of the Berlin Volks-Zeitung of December 11, 1904, presented the four variants - one by the city and three by GBS. Under the leadership of Friedrich Krause, the city revised its design and shortly thereafter presented two options for a Lindentunnel. The existing intersection was chosen as the site because the ramps could not be built elsewhere or the cost of land acquisition was too high. The tunnel roadway was to have four tracks to accommodate the lines of the SSB and BESTAG trams acquired by the city, as well as the lines of GBS and its subsidiaries. In both designs, the northern ramp was located at the level of the chestnut grove. In the first design, the southern ramp was to be located to the east between the Opera House and the Princess's Palace; in the second design, it was to be located to the west between the Opera House and the Alte Bibliothek ("Commode").

At the same time, GBS expanded its plans and, together with its subsidiary Berlin-Charlottenburg Tramway, presented an extensive system of tunnel routes in 1905. These included two tunnels running east-west, a southern tunnel under Leipziger Strasse and Potsdamer Strasse, and a northern tunnel from the Opera House to behind Siegesallee in Tiergarten. The city criticized the plans as inadequate, and GBS modified them several times. The 1907 version of the northern tunnel included two loops under the Platz der Oper and the Brandenburg Gate to accommodate north-south traffic. The city administration, however, did not back down from its criticism, relying on the findings of several experts, including Gustav Kemmann and Otto Blum. City planning officer Friedrich Krause countered the GBS design with a memorandum proposing several short tunnels instead of two long ones, including at the Opera and the Brandenburg Gate, as well as numerous street breakthroughs. At a transportation conference on April 9, 1908, chaired by the Prussian Minister of Public Works, Paul von Breitenbach, he stated that the experts' reservations about the GBS designs were justified and attested to the great advantages of the urban designs. In an audience with the Kaiser, the mayor of Berlin, Martin Kirschner, finally decided that the northern tunnel - with the exception of the north-south crossings - was unnecessary. However, further studies were to be conducted for the south tunnel. The tunnel projects were effectively shelved.

Tunnel designs 1904-1911

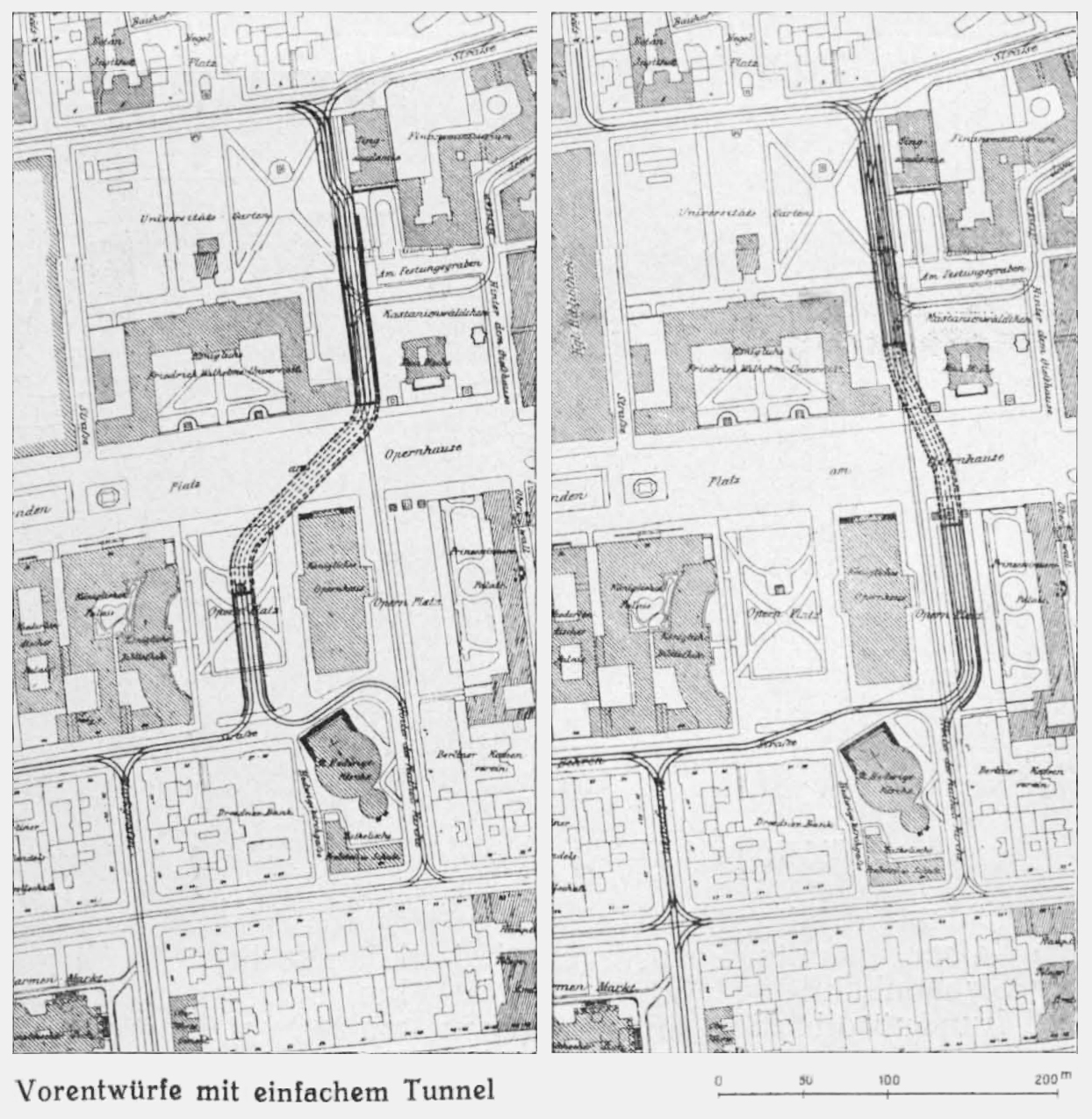
The city's first drafts for a four-track Lindentunnel

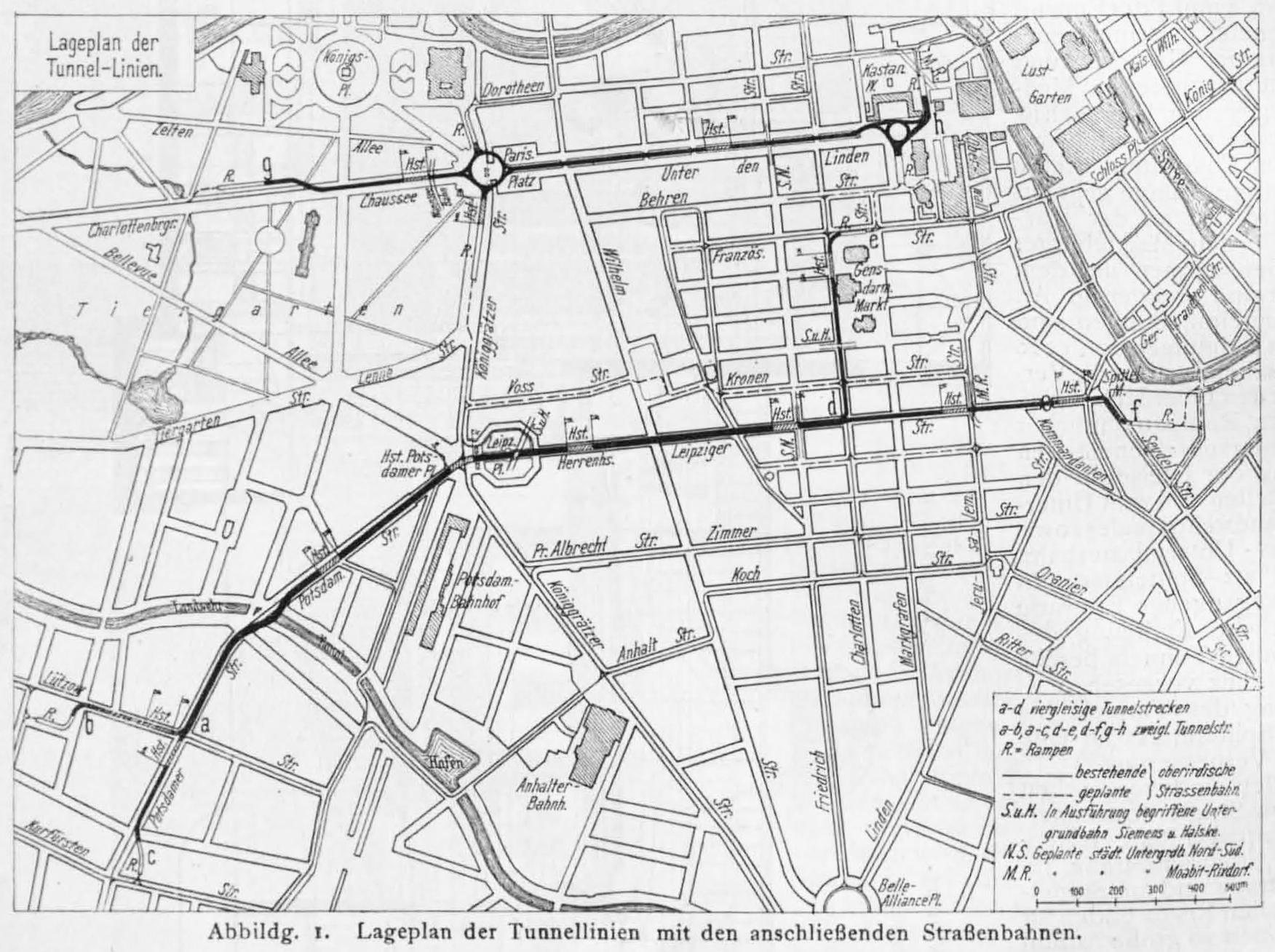
GBS tunnel designs with north and south tunnels, the Linden crossing was located at the eastern end of the north tunnel

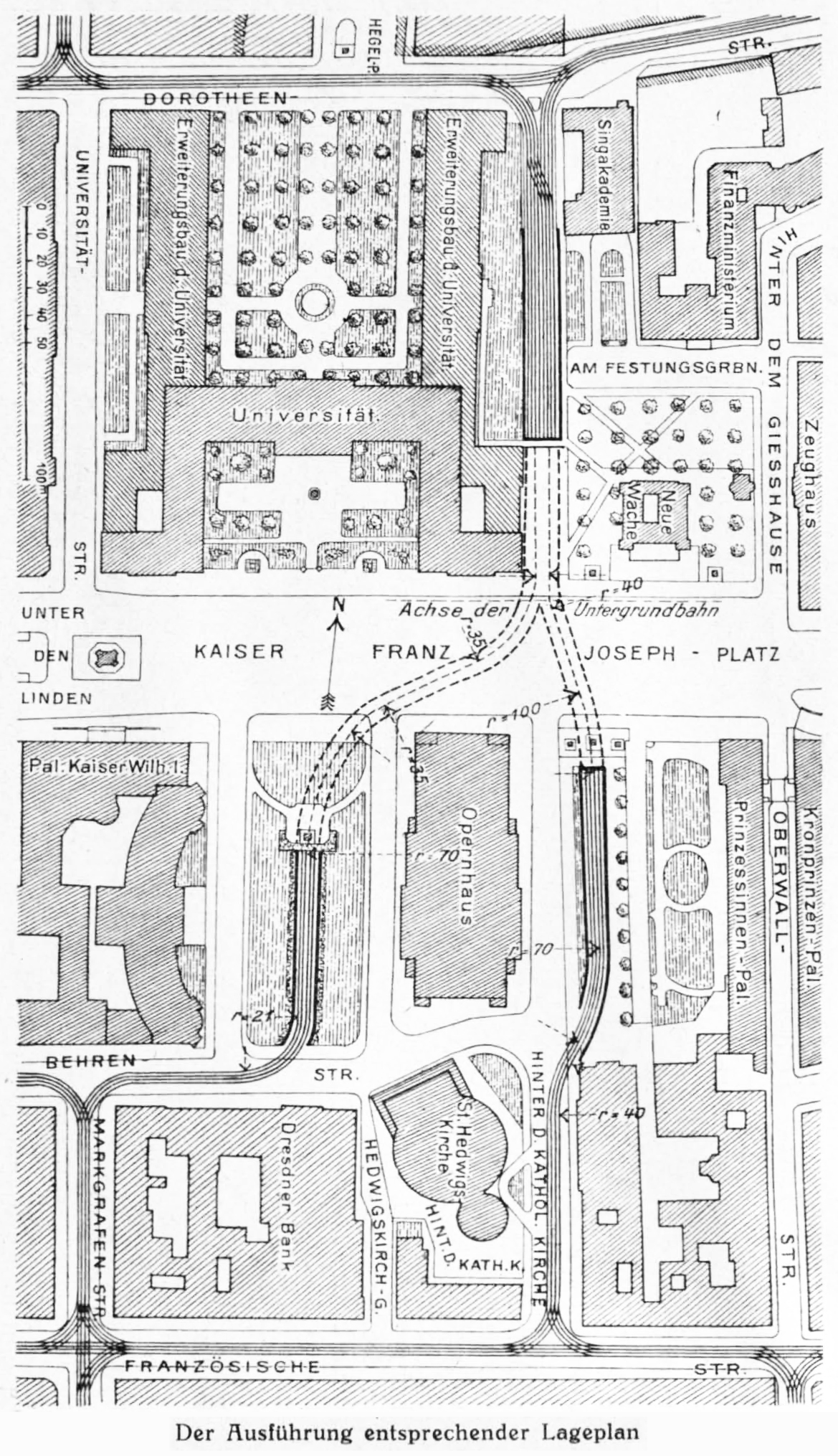
Design of the Lindentunnel for execution

However, GBS continued to pursue legal action until a settlement was reached with the city in 1911. This became the basis for a new consent decree. The agreement was entered into on August 18, 1911. The city extended its franchise until December 31, 1939, and granted the company additional rights with respect to the streets to be used and the fare structure. In return, the city secured the right to purchase the company at certain times. An agreement was also reached on the tunnel issue.

== Construction ==
=== Authorization ===
Paragraph 45 of the consent decree regulated the modalities for the construction of tram tunnels. The client was the City of Berlin. As the user of the facilities, GBS was required to pay interest on the investment costs at an annual rate of five percent. If other companies wanted to use the tunnel facilities, they had to pay a share of the vehicle kilometers driven in proportion to those driven by GBS. The city itself was most interested in a rapid completion of the Lindentunnel in order to connect its own lines, which terminate north and south of the tunnel. Initially, the city aimed for one of its variants from 1905. The Opera House and the neighboring St. Hedwig's Church objected to the installation of tramway tracks between the two buildings, which would have been necessary in both cases. In order not to overload Französische Strasse, a four-track tunnel was planned with two separate southern ramps on either side of the opera house. The east tunnel (Opera Tunnel) would be reserved for the GBS lines, while the west tunnel (Behrenstraßentunnel) would be reserved for the BESTAG and city tram lines. In addition, the GBS lines coming from the northwest should also use the west tunnel to avoid an intersection at the north ramp. In the event of a closure of the west tunnel, it was planned to reroute all lines through the east tunnel.

In February 1914, Kaiser Wilhelm II issued a building permit for the project, which was submitted to the Berlin City Council for approval on April 17, 1914. The cost of construction was estimated at 3.27 million marks (about 21.04 million euros in today's dollars), including the purchase of the land. The assembly approved the project on May 7, 1914, authorizing the magistrate to sign the contract negotiated with GBS. The last necessary authorization was granted by the Chief of Police on August 6, 1914, a few days after the outbreak of war. Preparatory work had begun in July.

=== Description of the tunnel system ===
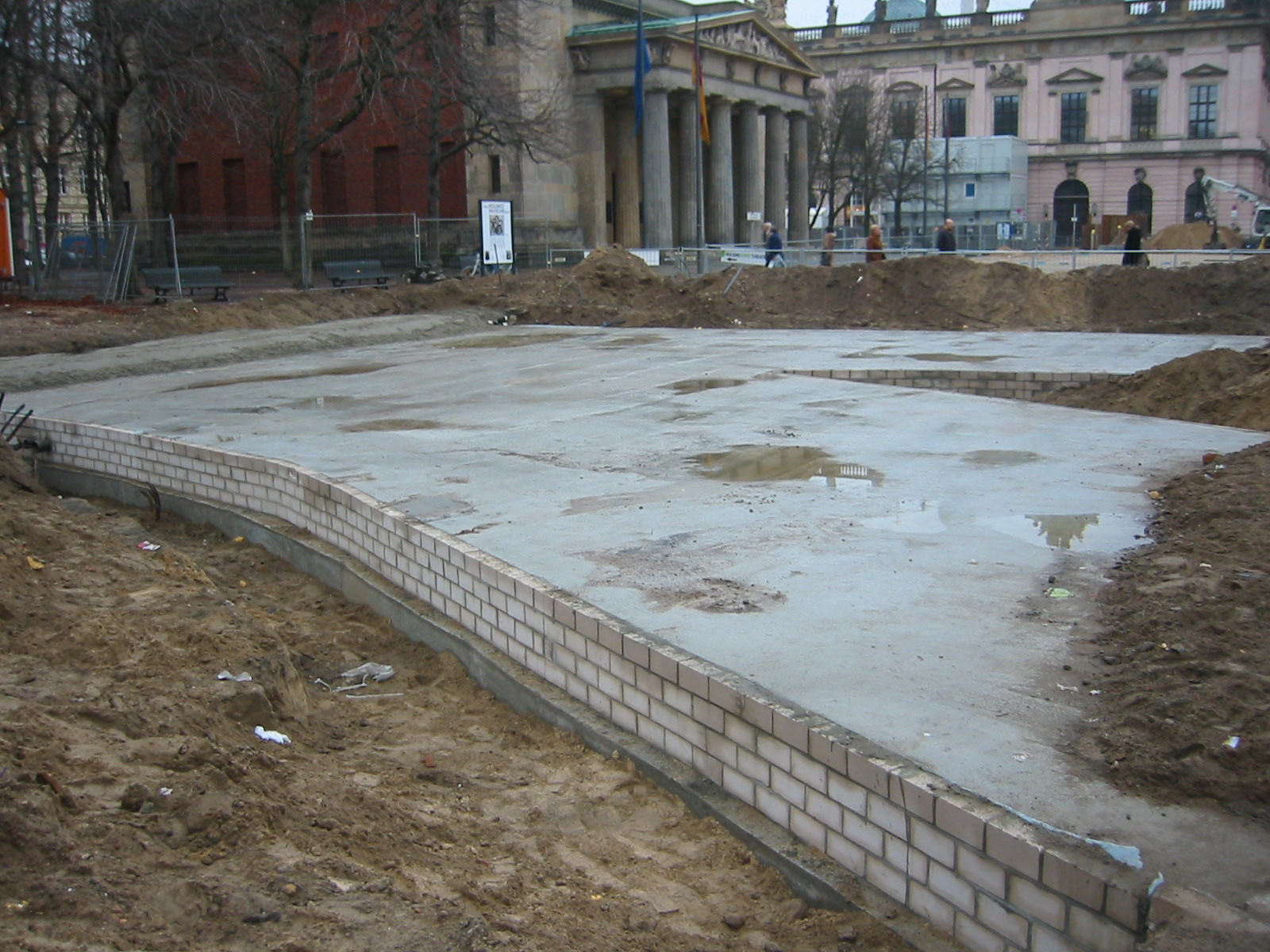
Ceiling of the Lindentunnel during renovation work, 2005

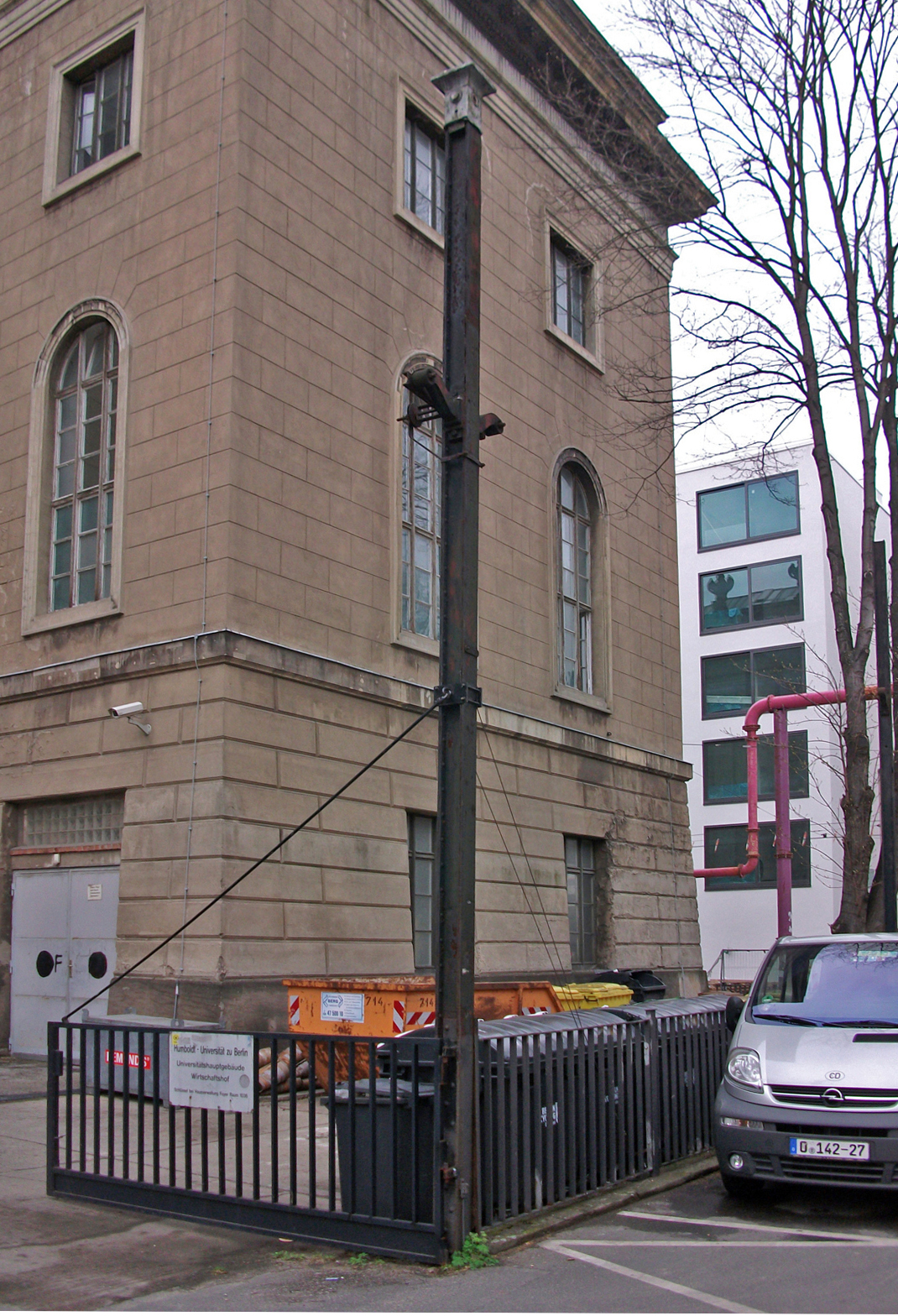
Remains of a catenary mast on the north ramp, 2012

The east tunnel had a total length of 354 meters including ramps, the west tunnel a total length of 389 meters. The covered sections were 123 meters (east tunnel) and 187 meters, respectively. The ramps had a maximum gradient of 50 per thousand (1:20) with a length of 126 meters on the north ramp and 105 meters (east tunnel) and 77 meters (west tunnel) on the south ramps. The east and west tunnels ran together from Dorotheenstrasse to the level of the northern edge of Lindenstrasse, where they split. The clear width of the north ramp was 11.60 meters, that of the south ramps 6.40 meters each. The center-to-center distance of the associated tracks was 2.60 meters, the center-to-center distance of the inner tracks in the four-track section was 2.90 meters. In the two-track tunnels, the clear width was 6.10 meters in a straight line and increased to 6.215 meters in curves. The four-track section was constructed without intermediate supports for the first 15 meters, with a clear width of 11.90 meters and 12.30 meters with supports. Between the tracks there was a protective space of 45-70 centimeters. The smallest radius was 35 meters. The clearance height was 4.65 meters in the east tunnel and 4.30 meters in the west tunnel. According to the GBS plans, the difference was due to the fact that double-deck trams were to run through the east tunnel. This was not possible in the west tunnel, however, because the project was awarded on the condition that the monument to Empress Augusta, which would pass underneath, would remain in place.

The tunnel floor was completely below the mean groundwater level in the covered section and about half of it in the ramp area. The deepest point in the east tunnel (28.39 meters above sea level) was about 4.50 meters below the groundwater table. Tamped concrete retaining walls 30 to 80 centimeters thick surrounded the ramps in the upper section. In the part of the tunnel below the groundwater level, a base was inserted to create a U-shaped profile. A protective layer of sand mortar served as a seal, over which a layer of asphalt cardboard was placed. The walls above the groundwater level and the ceiling received a two-layer protection, the walls below the groundwater level a three-layer protection, and the base a four-layer protection. The layers were bonded together with asphalt mix. The thickness of the tunnel floor, including the smoothing layer, concrete structure, waterproofing and superstructure, was 1.25 meters.

In the double-track tunnels, the ceiling consisted of I-beams spaced one meter apart. In between, concrete caps at least 35 centimeters thick formed the actual ceiling. The walls were 55 centimeters thick. In the four-track section with central supports, the distance between the I-beams was also one meter, and the central beams again rested on longitudinal beams that were supported on the central columns, each three meters apart. The wall here was 35 centimeters thick. In the four-track section without central supports, the I-beams were surrounded by a concrete pile section and arranged 40 centimeters apart with a wall thickness of 66 centimeters.

The tracks consisted of 15-meter-long grooved rails weighing 51 kilograms per meter. They were laid on wooden cross-ties in ballast bedding at one-meter intervals. The catenary consisted of copper profile wire with a cross-section of 80 square millimeters and was mounted on overhead insulators. The catenary was suitable for both roller pantographs and pantographs with brackets. The catenary was suspended from cantilever masts on the ramps. On the south ramp of the west tunnel, a double contact line had to be installed due to the steep gradient. The tunnel had electric wall lamps for lighting, which were shielded so that the light only shone up and down. The tram cars could do without their own lighting during the day.

Due to the steep incline of the ramps and the limited field of view caused by the curves in the track, several safety systems were in place:

1. Dispatchers stationed at the ramps had to make sure that the cars kept to the 10 km/h speed limit and that there was enough distance between them and the train in front.
2. The dispatchers were in telephone contact with each other and with the depots.
3. There were safety buttons in the tunnel that could be used to alert dispatchers and prevent further trains from entering.
4. Service stops were also established. At these mandatory stops, the engineer - the conductor in the car - had to check that the couplings between the cars were working properly, apply the handbrake if necessary, and then give the departure signal.
5. The conductors had to stand on the rear boarding platforms during the passage, ready to apply the brakes.

All in all, these measures meant that there were no serious disruptions to regular operations.

In addition to these measures, the Royal Berlin Railway Authority (Königliche Eisenbahn-Direktion Berlin) required the installation of a signal system to indicate to the driver whether the track ahead was occupied or not. The signals were installed 32 meters apart and showed a red light when occupied and a green light when unoccupied. There were contacts in the center of the block sections that switched the signal from the run position to the stop position when the train passed over them. The section was cleared when the train passed the next contact.

The tunnel's operating rules, which came into effect in 1925, referred to the signal system, but some literature sources do not indicate whether it was still in use at that time. Other sources suggest that the tunnel was eventually operated without signaling because of the mandatory stops, the prescribed maximum speed of 10 km/h, and the prescribed minimum distance of 25 meters between two trains.

=== Special constructions ===
Under the northern lane of the "Linden", the tunnel floor was reinforced over a length of about ten meters in order to be able to excavate a pit under the tram tunnel for the construction of the then planned subway Moabit - Görlitzer Station. In addition, several supply lines of the Reichspost, gas, electricity and water works crossed the tunnel. Wherever possible, the ceiling was provided with corresponding arches in which the pipes were laid. Due to the low ceiling height, thicker pipes had to be divided into several smaller pipes. The sewer pipes were routed around the ramps. The accessible heating duct of the Opera House was culverted.

On the south side of the avenue, the tunnel passed under the monuments to Blücher to the east of the Opera House and to Empress Augusta between the Opera House and the "Commode". For this purpose, foundation walls were laid along the sides of the tunnel walls to below the tunnel floor, and support grids were laid over them at close intervals to support the pedestal of the monuments. The tunnel ceiling was weakened in these sections. The Empress Augusta monument also had to be raised by about 60 centimeters to make room for the west tunnel ramp.

At the lowest points of both tunnels, pump sumps with two centrifugal pumps each were installed in niches to drain the surface water into the sewer system. One pump served as a reserve. The units were automatically activated by float switches.

=== Construction of the Eiserne Bridge ===
The new Eiserne Bridge over the Kupfergraben was built at the same time as the tunnel. Before the tunnel was built, the tracks ran in a straight line from the bridge via Am Festungsgraben and Hinter dem Gießhaus to Lindenkreuzung. The construction of the northern ramp required a detour via Dorotheenstraße and Am Kupfergraben. As the old bridge was too narrow to accommodate the curve in the track towards Am Kupfergraben, it had to be rebuilt. The construction costs were estimated at 600,000 marks. Work began on October 12, 1914 with the construction of an auxiliary bridge, which was completed on March 24, 1915. The old bridge was then demolished and the new bridge built. The abutments of the new bridge were erected in November 1915 and the structure was dedicated on December 9, 1916. In order not to obstruct through traffic, the Berlin-Charlottenburg tram trains, which had previously turned at Dorotheenstrasse, were given a new turnaround at Am Kupfergraben, north of Dorotheenstrasse.

=== Construction and commissioning ===
Actual construction began on September 7, 1914, by Siemens & Halske. Work progressed relatively quickly at first, as many companies had stopped their normal contract work due to the outbreak of war and now had free capacity. During 1915, a shortage of labor became apparent as most of the remaining workers were called up for military service. Wherever possible, women performed the sometimes physically demanding work.

The excavation pit was first covered with steel girders and planks, over which the "Linden" roadway would later run. When it was completed in December 1914, the road was open to traffic. Excavation work then began. Since the east tunnel ran roughly in the direction of the old Linden intersection, the tracks of the above-ground intersection had to be swung to the east during construction. On both sides of the trench, I-beams were driven into the ground at 1.5-meter intervals up to 1.5 meters below the base and braced together two meters above the base and 3 centimeters below the ground. Wooden planks were then inserted between the beams. In the area of the university, the tunnel walls extended to within half a meter of the foundation walls of the east wing. To prevent parts of the building from sinking, the tension pressing the planks against the ground was increased by arched plates riveted between iron posts. The convex side of the arch faced the university's foundations. The excavated material was loaded onto dump trucks and driven by a benzene-fueled locomotive to the copper ditch, where a barge loading station had been established.

The breakthrough in the west tunnel took place on January 3, 1915. In early February 1915, work began on lowering the groundwater level; pumps were set up every five to six meters to drain the water into the nearby River Spree. Excavation continued until May 1915, after which work began on the floor and walls of the tunnel. The ceiling was installed on October 22, 1915. In January 1916, the pumps for lowering the groundwater were removed. On January 17, 1916, the final phase of construction of the north ramp began. For this purpose, the eastern approach to the Lindenkreuzung via the streets Am Festungsgraben and Hinter dem Gießhaus was closed and the tram trains from the Eiserne Bridge were rerouted via the streets Am Kupfergraben and Dorotheenstraße to Kastanienwäldchen.

By June 1916, the waterproofing and concreting work had been completed to the point where construction of the track bed could begin. In addition to the actual track bed, this included the aforementioned centrifugal pumps, tunnel lighting, ramp railings and integrated catenary masts, as well as the signaling system required by the supervisory authority. The ramps were largely hidden from passersby by flower beds and hedges.

The inauguration ceremony took place on December 9, 1916, in the presence of representatives of the Berlin Police Department and the Royal Railway Directorate in their capacity as supervisory authorities, city planning commissioner Friedrich Krause, representatives of the Greater Berlin Association, and the directors of the three streetcar companies. Those present first walked through the tunnel in both directions before it was used by two tram cars. Due to minor complaints about the tunnel's signaling system, the inauguration was postponed to a later date. Nevertheless, the city of Berlin celebrated the inauguration of the tunnel the following day by Mayor Adolf Wermuth. He unveiled two commemorative plaques on the railing above the north entrance. The side facing the ramp read: "Lindentunnel - Built by the City of Berlin". The side facing the street read: "Construction of the Lindentunnel began in 1914 under the government of Kaiser Wilhelm II. Despite the World War, construction continued as planned and the tunnel was opened to traffic in 1916". The first plaque has survived, but the second no longer exists.

The GBS roller pantographs, which did not reliably trigger the signal contacts, were still causing problems. Since the three companies had agreed to a joint inauguration, the city lines were not yet running through the tunnel. The new commissioning date was initially set for December 14, 1916, and when the problem persisted, for December 16, 1916. Since the work on the cars had not been completed by then, the city companies began operating their lines through the West Tunnel the following day. Two days later, on December 19, 1916, the GBS lines 33, 40, 42, 44, 53, 54, 55 and the SBV line III used the east tunnel, and the GBS lines 12, 18, 32, 43 also used the west tunnel. The above-ground Linden crossing was decommissioned the same day.

== Utilization of the tunnel ==
=== Tramway ===
The tunnel never reached its intended capacity of 120 trains per hour per direction. Due to World War I, the timetable was severely restricted at the beginning of construction. Further lines of the city tramway, which were also supposed to use the tunnel, were not built. With the gradual merger of the individual companies under the Greater Berlin Act to form the Berlin Tramway in December 1920, the service initially remained the same. With the onset of hyperinflation, the fledgling company was forced to discontinue streetcar service on September 8, 1923. The following day went down in Berlin's transportation history as "Tramless Day. On September 10, 1923, the Berlin Tramway Company resumed service with a truncated network of 32 or 33 lines. (Note: depending on the source) Initially, no line ran through the Lindentunnel; the Westtunnel was completely closed from then on and its tracks were extended in the 1920s.

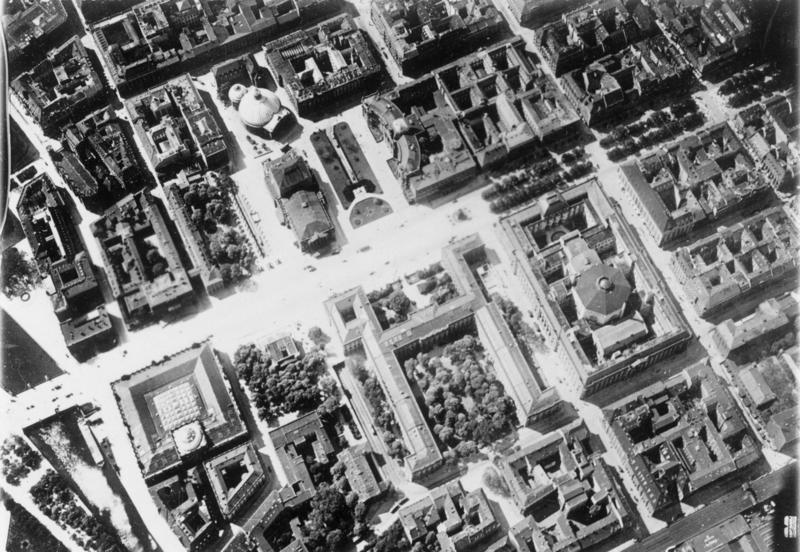
Aerial view of Kaiser-Franz-Joseph-Platz with the ramps of the Lindentunnel, 1935

On March 31, 1924, about half a year after the cessation of operations, the first line, line 32 (Reinickendorf, Pankower Allee - Neukölln, Knesebeckstraße), ran through the East Tunnel again. In the following years, an average of four to five lines ran through the tunnel. When the first section of the Nordsüdbahn (Note: Line U6) was opened in January 1923, some of the passengers switched to the subway. The West Tunnel was no longer needed, and after the "streetcar-free day" in 1923, it remained without streetcar service for the rest of the year. In 1926, as part of the redesign of Kaiser-Franz-Joseph-Platz for the extension of the Opera House, the tunnel was closed off with a retaining wall, the ramps were filled in, and the area was leveled.

The opening of the GN Railway (Note: Line U8) as a second north-south line led to further line closures in the tramway network. During World War II and the associated fuel rationing, the Berlin Transport Company (BVG), which had emerged from the Berlin Tramway in 1929, replaced several bus lines with tram lines. With up to ten lines, the tunnel reached its highest capacity after inflation. As the war progressed, the number of lines steadily decreased until - according to literature from 1964 - the last lines running through the tunnel, lines 12 (last stop Gartenfeld or Siemensstadt - Dönhoffplatz) and 13 (last stop Moabit, Wiebestraße - Klingenberg power station), had to be discontinued in the spring of 1945 after damage to the southern ramp. According to information from 2012, with the last emergency timetable from January 25, 1945, the last line running through the tunnel was line 12 (previously lines 12, 35, and 61), which also only ran during rush hour. It was still in service on April 12, 1945, until it was discontinued in the last days of the war.

Allied bombing raids severely damaged the tunnel in a total of five places.

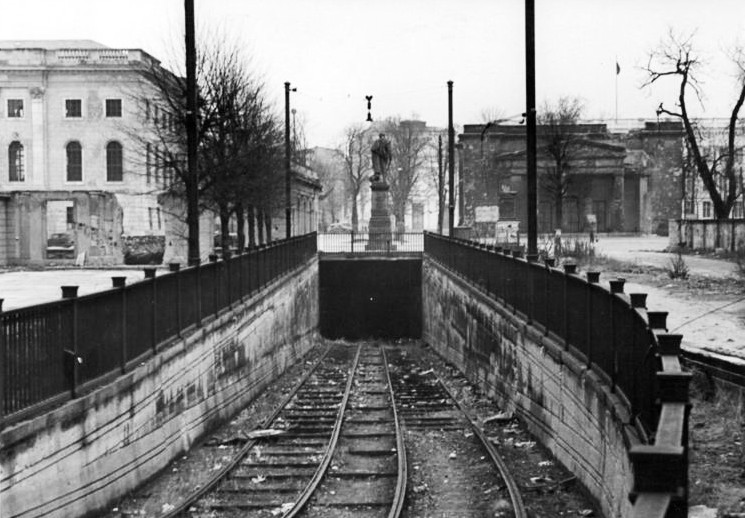
South portal of the east tunnel, 1950

Its reopening after the war was a long time coming, as other lines were given priority. The Berliner Zeitung reported that line 46 (Nordend - Dönhoffplatz) would begin using the tunnel again on May 26, 1950, one day after the opening of the first German Youth Festival. About one and a half years later, after the end of the III. World Festival of Youth and Students on September 2, 1951. The closure was connected with the reconstruction of the State Opera House, whose administration building was to be enlarged and thus encroached on the building line of the south ramp. In the following years, there were sporadic plans to build a new south ramp leading to Oberwallstraße. The plans soon became obsolete due to the removal of the tramway from the downtown area south of the light rail viaduct. The north ramp was used until the 1960s for sweeping streetcar trains.

=== Other uses and conversion work until 1989 ===
In the 1930s, the West Tunnel was used for lighting tests as part of Berlin's transformation into the world capital of Germania. The results were to be used in the construction of a road tunnel near the Brandenburg Gate. After its abandonment, the Osttunnel was first used as a backdrop storage area for the Berlin State Opera. Later, it was used to store components for the grandstand at Marx-Engels-Platz. (Note: Since 1994: Schloßplatz) The height of the tunnel was reduced in the 1960s when a heating channel was built under the road. In the 1960s, the roadway of the northern ramp was asphalted, making the tunnel accessible to road vehicles. In addition, the tunnel walls and ceiling were painted white and modern lighting and emergency power were installed. Initially, the operational combat group of the GDR Ministry of Foreign Trade parked its vehicles and equipment here, and later the cars of the National Police were also parked here. In a separate room at the end of the west tunnel, there was a switchboard for the People's Police operational television, which was used by the Ministry for State Security and others to monitor important points in East Berlin.

=== After 1990 ===
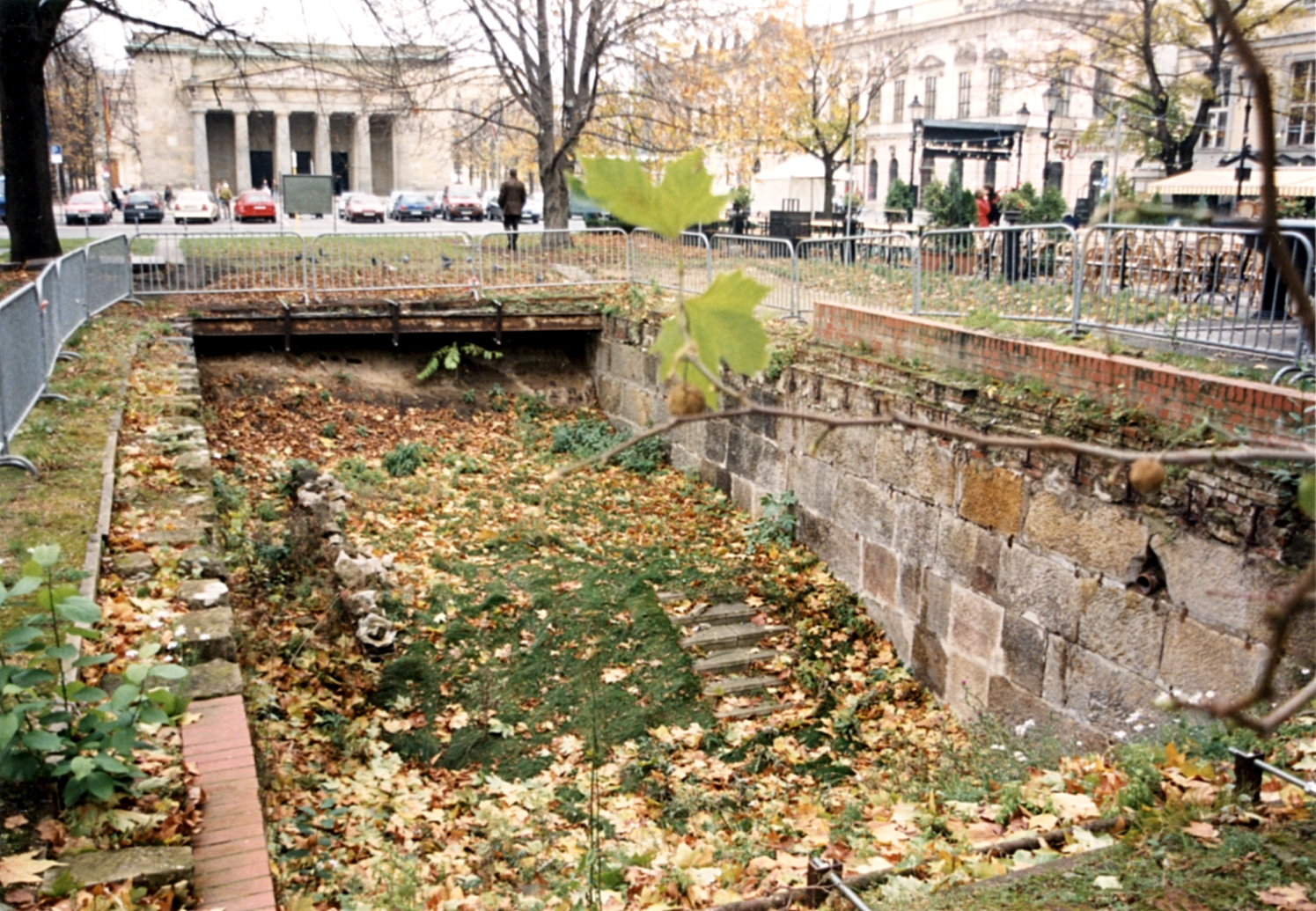
South side of the tunnel, 1998

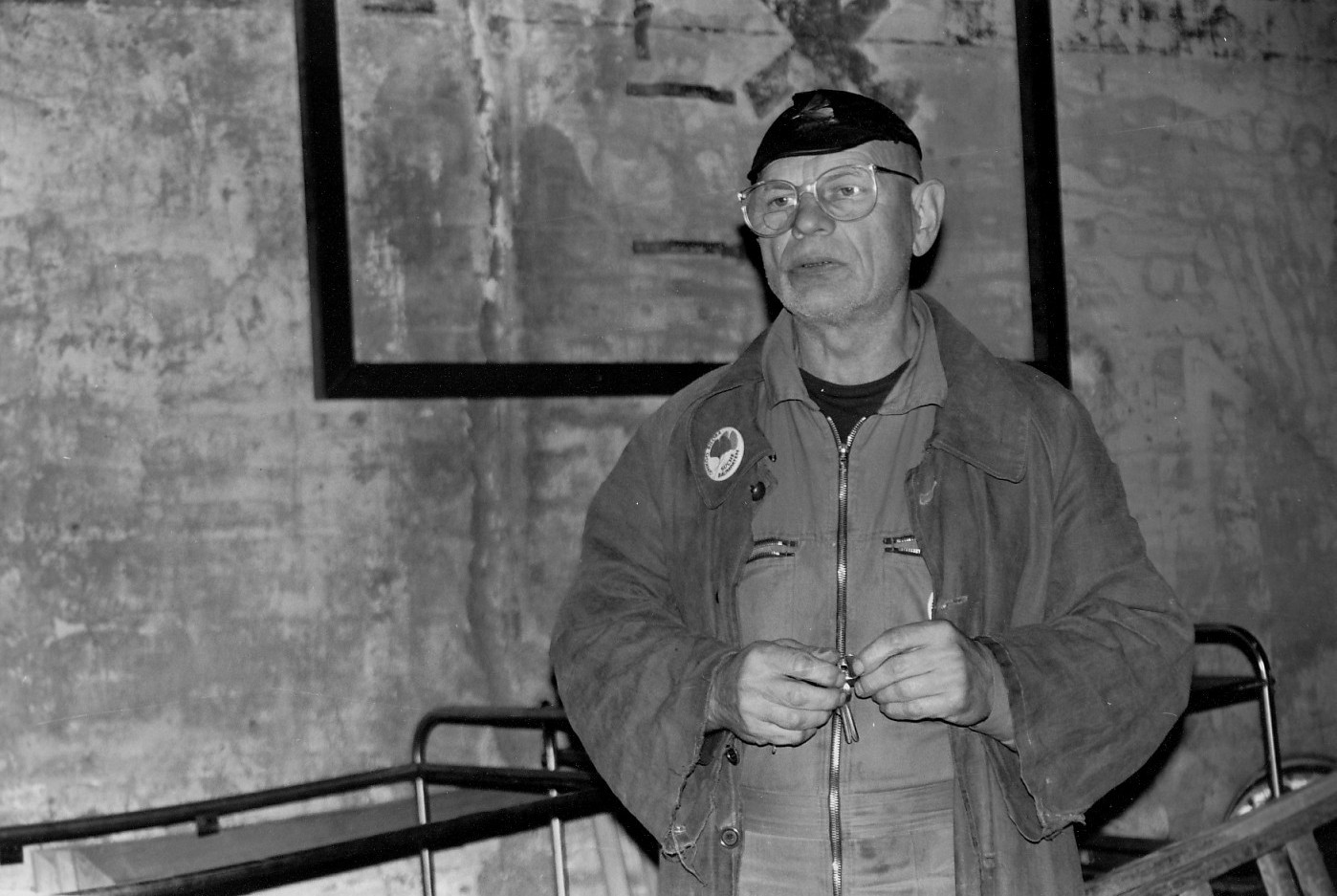
Ben Wagin in the Lindentunnel, 1995

After the political change, the tunnel filled up with rainwater when a pump broke down, before being "rediscovered" by various artists starting in 1994. Beginning in 1994, performance artist Ben Wagin used most of the tunnel for his installations. In the run-up to the UN Climate Conference in Berlin, for example, he installed the refurbished tram 217 053, which was given to him by the BVG on July 15, 1994, on the north ramp.

In the mid-1990s, the Berlin Senate planned to build an underground parking garage under Bebelplatz using the Lindentunnel as an access road. However, the construction of a memorial to the 1933 book burning in Germany in the area of the southern ramp in the middle of Bebelplatz changed these plans. The remains of the tunnel under the square were completely removed for its construction. In December 1998, Ben Wagin had to move the existing installations to a loading hall at the Gleisdreieck subway station. After the area was filled in, the Platz der Märzrevolution was created. The memorial plaque on the north side of the ramp became the property of the Berlin Underworlds Association. The southern access road on the west side of Unter den Linden was partially uncovered and an information board was installed.

In 2000, there was another "revival attempt": on the initiative of Wieland Giebel, the Lindentunnel was to serve as an exhibition space for a new Berlin museum. This project also failed.

Since September 2002, the Maxim Gorki Theater has been using an approximately 80-meter-long section of the tunnel from the north ramp as a scenery storage area. The props are transported by a freight elevator embedded in the pavement.

The planned underground parking garage was built in 2003. This required the demolition of the western tunnel between the southern sidewalk of "Linden" and Behrenstraße. Access to the remaining section is via a door in a connecting corridor between the underground garage and the State Opera.

During the renovation of the street Unter den Linden in 2005-2006, the remaining parts of the tunnel structure were sealed. Structural defects such as severe movement cracks and concrete spalling necessitated the installation of emergency supports. Partial demolition is planned after the completion of the extension of the U5 subway line, which passes under the Lindentunnel. In the medium term, the tunnel will be completely demolished.

In December 2021, Berlin newspapers reported that the tunnel's load-bearing capacity was limited. As a result, the axle load for vehicles will be limited to 18 tons in the spring of 2022. This will affect BVG's double-decker buses. They will have to be replaced by articulated buses. In the long term, the tunnel is expected to be filled in. However, there is no concrete timetable yet.

== Lines that ran through the tunnel ==
Line overview
Operator	Line	Routing	Ref	Net spider
September 1, 1911				
GBS	12	Plötzensee – Görlitzer Station		
GBS	13	Moabit, Bremer Straße – Neukölln, Knesebeckstraße		
GBS	18	Jungfernheide Station – Görlitzer Station		
GBS	20	Beusselstraße Station – Neukölln, Hertzbergplatz		
GBS	33	Pappelallee/Schönhauser Allee – Charlottenburg, Kantstraße/Leibnizstraße (– Witzleben, Neue Kantstraße/Dernburgstraße)		
GBS	34	Pankstraße/Badstraße – Wilmersdorf, Wilhelmsaue		
GBS	39	Badstraße/Exzerzierstraße – Marheinekeplatz		
GBS	40	Swinemünder Straße/Ramlerstraße – Schöneberg, Eisenacher Straße		
GBS	42	Seestraße/Amrumer Straße – Marheinekeplatz		
GBS	43	Müllerstraße/Seestraße – Schöneberg, Eisenacher Straße		
GBS	44	Schönhauser Allee/Gleimstraße – Kreuzberg, Bergmannstraße		
GBS	53	Danziger Straße/Weißenburger Straße – Neukölln, Steinmetzstraße		
GBS	54	Schönhauser Allee Station – Jungfernheide Station		
GBS	55	Danziger Straße/Weißenburger Straße – Britz, Rathaus		
SBV	III	Swinemünder Straße/Ramlerstraße – Schöneberg, General-Pape-Straße		
December 19, 1916
West tunnel
BESTAG	o. Nr.	Buchholz, Kirche – Treptow, Graetzstraße		
BESTAG	o. Nr.	Pankow, Damerowstraße/Mendelstraße – Treptow, Graetzstraße		
SSB		Städtischer Ostring		
GBS	12	Plötzensee – Görlitzer		
GBS	18	(Siemensstadt, Verwaltungsgebäude –) Jungfernheide Station – Görlitzer Station		
GBS	32	Reinickendorf, Rathaus – Görlitzer Station		
GBS	43	Seestraße/Müllerstraße – Schöneberg, Mühlenstraße		
East tunnel
GBS	33	Weißensee, Prenzlauer Promenade – Witzleben, Neue Kantstraße/Dernburgstraße		
GBS	40	Swinemünder Straße/Ramlerstraße – Schöneberg, Hauptstraße/Eisenacher Straße		
GBS	42	Seestraße/Amrumer Straße – Friesenstraße/Schwiebusser Straße		
GBS	44	Schönhauser Allee/Gleimstraße – Neu-Tempelhof, Hohenzollernkorso/Deutscher Ring		
GBS	53	Danziger Straße/Weißenburger Straße – Neukölln, Steinmetzstraße		
GBS	54	Nordkapstraße – Jungfernheide Station (– Siemensstadt, Administration building)		
GBS	55	Danziger Straße/Weißenburger Straße – Britz, Rathaus		
SBV	III	Swinemünder Straße/Ramlerstraße – Schöneberg, General-Pape-Straße		
May 1, 1938
BVG	12	Gartenfeld resp. Siemensstadt, Verwaltungsgebäude – Neukölln, Köllnische Allee		
BVG	13	Moabit, Wiebestraße – Kraftwerk Klingenberg		
BVG	35	Wilhelmsruh, Hauptstraße – Mariendorf, Rennbahn		
BVG	40	Grünthaler Straße/Bornholmer Straße – Dahlem, Kronprinzenallee/Königin-Luise-Straße		
BVG	49	Buchholz, Kirche – Schützenstraße/Markgrafenstraße		
BVG	61	Reinickendorf-Ost, Teichstraße – Steglitz, Stadtpark		
May 26, 1950
BVG (East)	46	Nordend, Straßenbahnhof – Mitte, Dönhoffplatz		

== Bibliography ==
- Der Straßenbahn-Tunnel unter den Linden in Berlin, Deutsche Bauzeitung, no. 30, 31, 33, Berlin, 1916
- M. Dietrich (1917), Der Straßenbahn-Tunnel „Unter den Linden" in Berlin", Deutsche Straßen- und Kleinbahnzeitung, pp. 269–274
- Hans-Joachim Pohl (1980), Der Lindentunnel, Verkehrsgeschichtliche Blätter, no. 7
- Rüdiger Hachtmann, Peter Strehlau (1994), Der Straßenbahntunnel Unter den Linden, Berliner Verkehrsblätter, no. 12.
- Ulrich Conrad (2012), Wortwörtlich „unter den Linden", Straßenbahn Magazin, no. 10.
- Jürgen von Brietzke: Tunnelplanungen der Großen Berliner Straßenbahn 1905–1910. In: Berliner Verkehrsblätter, Issue 1, 2017.
- Das Millionprojekt der Straßenbahn. Für und gegen die Untertunnelung. In: Berliner Tageblatt, September 28, 1905.
