= Ulva (disambiguation) =

Ulva is an island in the Inner Hebrides, Scotland.

Ulva may also refer to:

- Ulva Belsham (1921–2011), New Zealand telegraphist and radio operator
- Ulva Island (New Zealand)
- New Ulva, on Island of Danna, in the Inner Hebrides, Scotland
- Ulva, a genus of green algae, the sea lettuces
- Ulva, a taxonomic synonym of a genus of sedges, Carex

== See also ==
- Uvula
- Vulva
