= Volva =

Volva may refer to:

- Völva, one of various Old Norse terms for a North Germanic seeress
- Volva (gastropod), a genus of sea snails
- Volva (mycology), a cup-like structure at the base of a mushroom

== See also ==
- Vulva (disambiguation)
- Volvo, a manufacturing company, along with Volvo Cars, which separated from it.
