= Ben Wagin =

German artist (1930–2021)

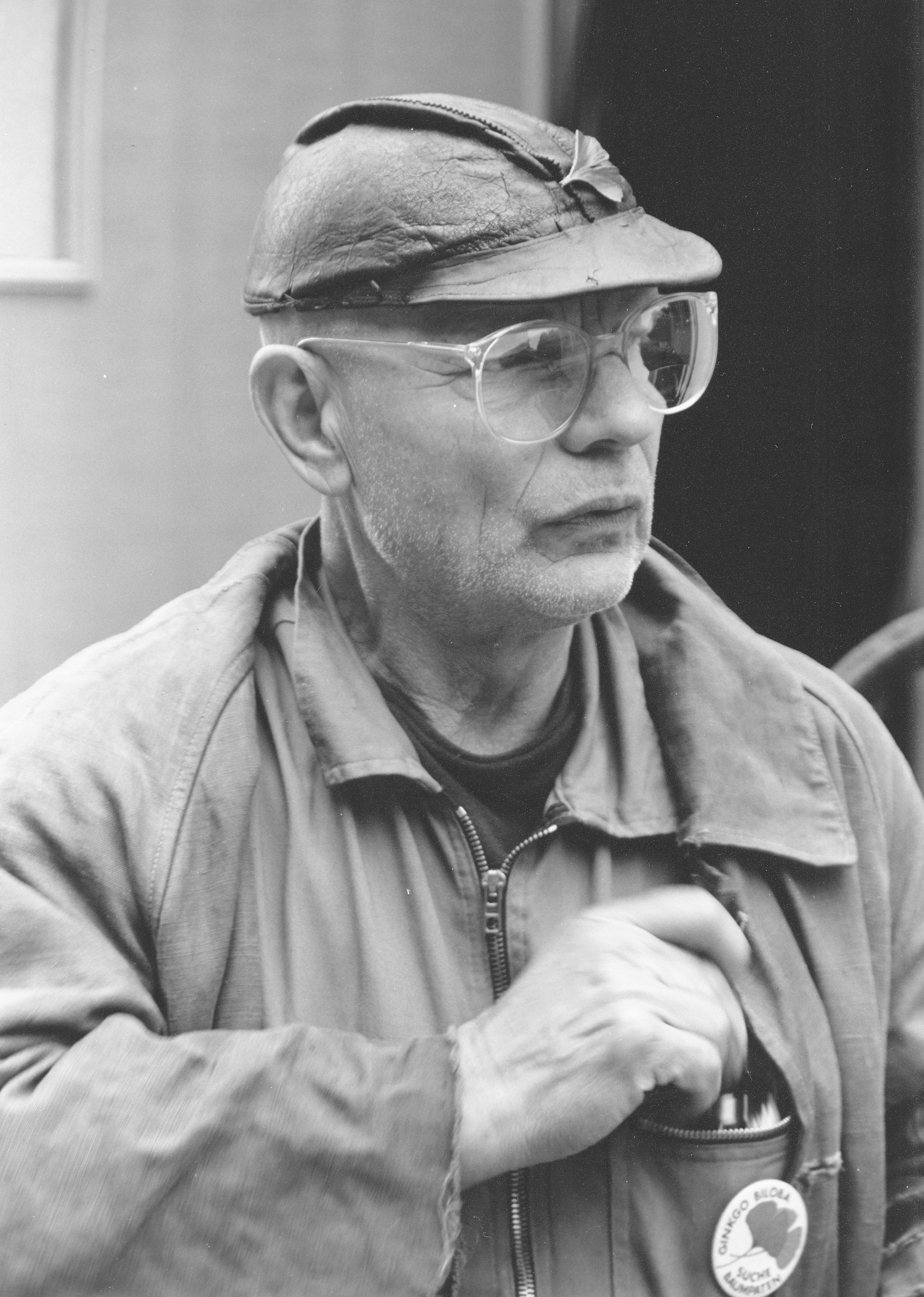
- Wagin in 1995
- Born: 25 March 1930; Jastrow, Prussia, Germany
- Died: 28 July 2021 (aged 91); Berlin, Germany
- Education: Hochschule der Künste
- Occupations: Artist; sculptor; draughtsman; action artist
- Organizations: Galerie S; Die Baumpaten
- Awards: Order of Merit of the Federal Republic of Germany; Order of Merit of Berlin

Ben Wagin (25 March 1930 – 28 July 2021) was a German artist, sculptor, draughtsman, designer, performance artist, author and composer. He ran the Galerie S gallery, and founded the artists' group die Baumpaten (Godfathers of trees) which planted trees in cities. He created the installation The Parliament of Trees in Berlin.

== Life ==
Born Bernhard Wargin in Jastrow, Prussia, Wagin lived in West Berlin from 1957 on. There he studied at the Hochschule der Künste and while a student, he worked as an assistant for the sculptor Karl Hartung and others.

On 3 May 1962, he opened the "Galerie S", where he first presented work by Berlin artists. The gallery soon became known in Germany and abroad. In May 1966, Wagin began to publish a monthly newsletter Galerien + Museen in Berlin (Galleries + museums in Berlin). On 8 May 1968, he moved with the gallery to the Europa-Center. From 1970 he regularly showed art installations at Art Basel. He founded the association Baumpatenverein (Godparents of trees) in Berlin, aiming at fostering the quality of urban life in that city. He exhibited at the Berlin-Pavillon in the 1970s, the orangery of Charlottenburg Palace, and also at the Lindentunnel next to Humboldt University from 1993 to 1996. He used a hall of the TU Berlin on Ackerstraße as a studio and exhibition space from 1983.

In many works, exhibitions and other performances, Wagin raised awareness of man-made changes to the natural environment. In 1975, he initiated one of the first murals in Berlin, at Siegmunds Hof, called Weltbaum I (World Tree I). It is to date one of the biggest of them. In 1985 he designed Weltbaum II with many other artists on the firewall at Berlin's Savignyplatz station. Wagin planted numerous trees in and around Berlin, often with politicians and persons engaged in the cultural sector. As of 2019, Wagin's trees still stand in front of federal ministries, theatres, museums, among others in front of Berliner Ensemble, the Gedächtniskirche, and the Neue Nationalgalerie.

In 2005, Wagin started "Sonnenboten" (Messengers of the Sun) which has since created 4 million oases of sunflowers together with schools and communities across Germany. Wagin was known as Baumpate (Godfather of Trees) nationwide and has been able to plant around 50,000 Ginkgo trees from Moscow to Vilshofen.

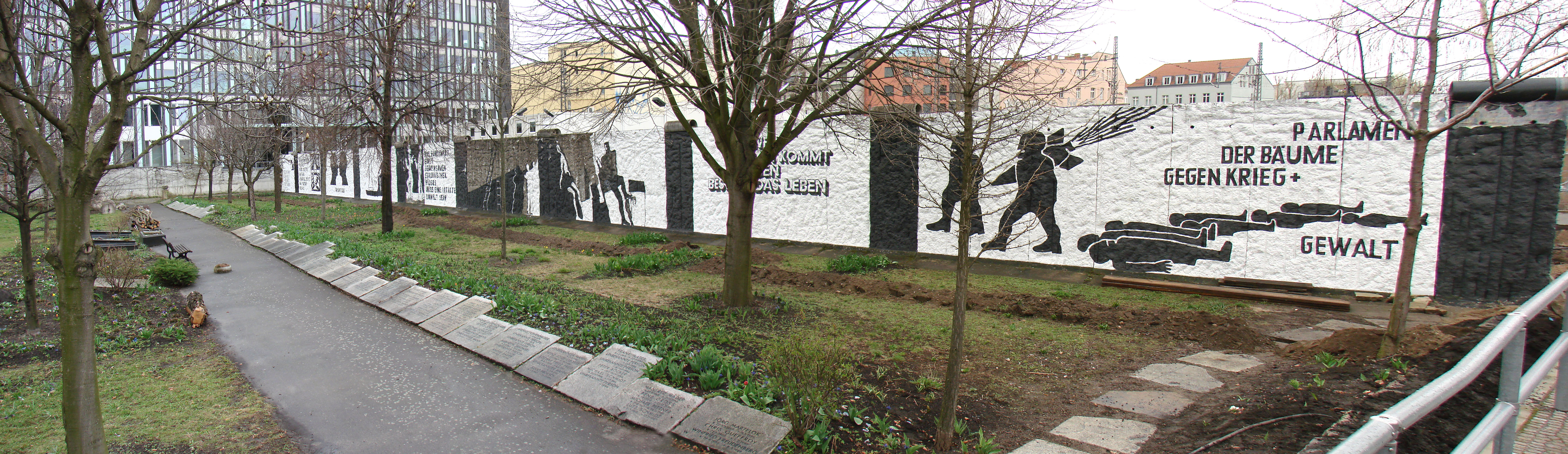
The Parliament of Trees in 2010

Wagin created the installation The Parliament of Trees in the middle of Berlin's governmental quarter in the 1990s, as a monument for the victims at the Berlin Wall. He fought for years for its preservation. Pieces of the Wall designed by Wagin were included in the library building of the German national parliament in Marie-Elisabeth-Lüders-Haus and are known as Mauer-Mahnmal des Bundestages (Memorial of the Berlin Wall of the German Parliament).

From 2015 on, he converted the historic land as well as some of the halls of the former Anhalter Güterbahnhof, part of the Berlin Anhalter Bahnhof right next to the German Museum of Technology, into a natural and cultural memorial site. Wagin was a member of Deutscher Künstlerbund, a German society of artists.

Wagin died in Berlin on 28 July 2021 at age 91.

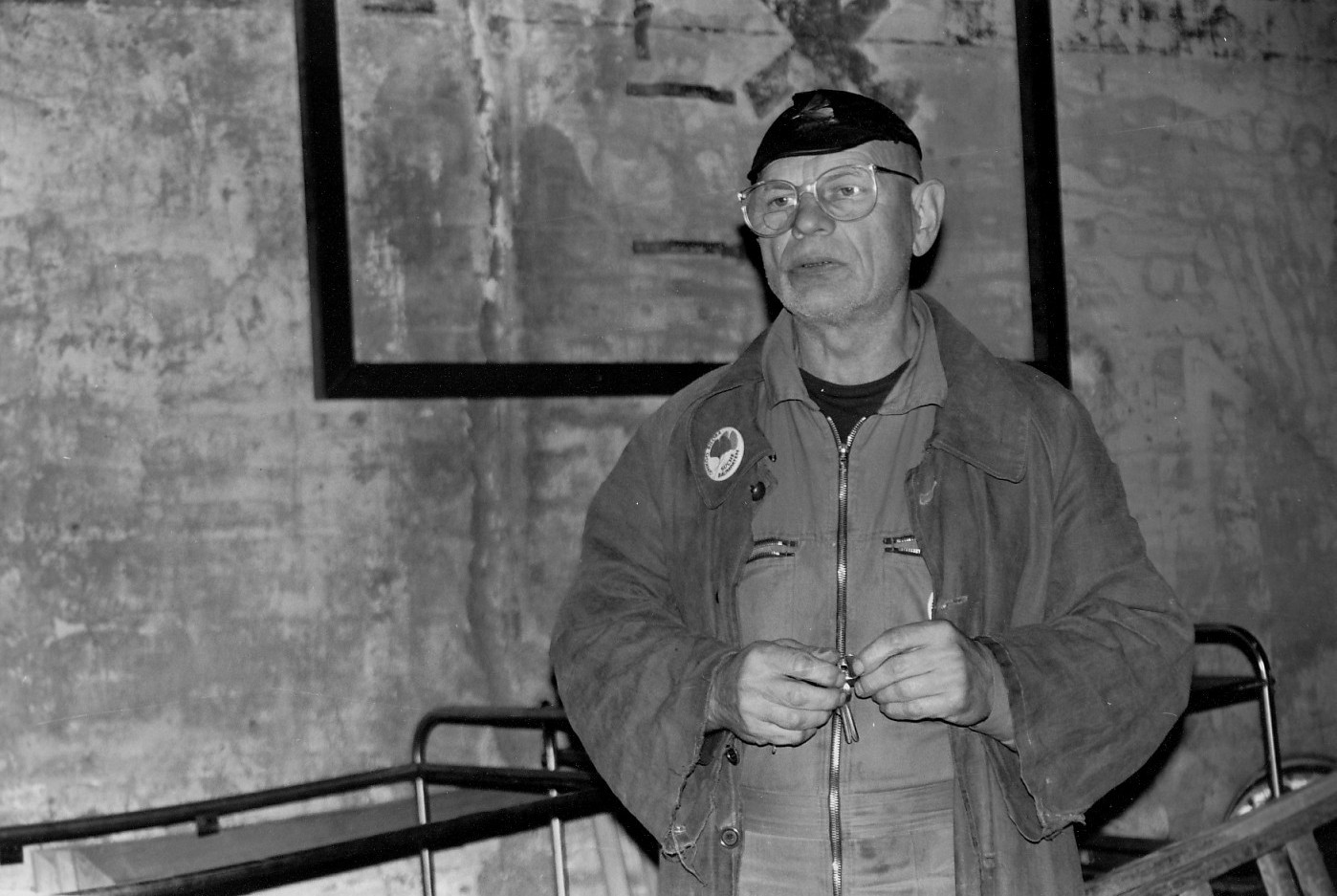
Ben Wagin in the Lindentunnel, 1995

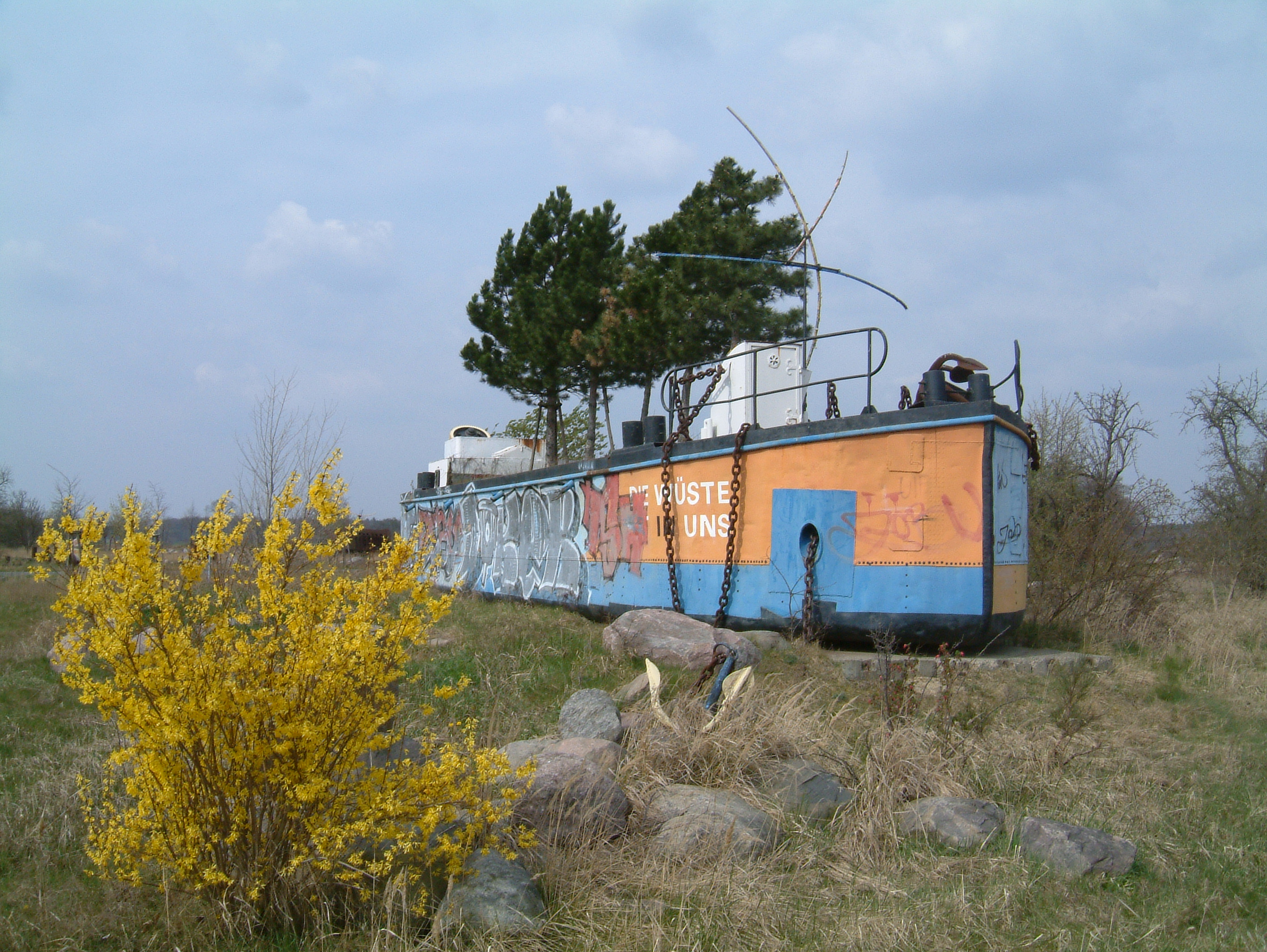
Project at Gräbendorfer See

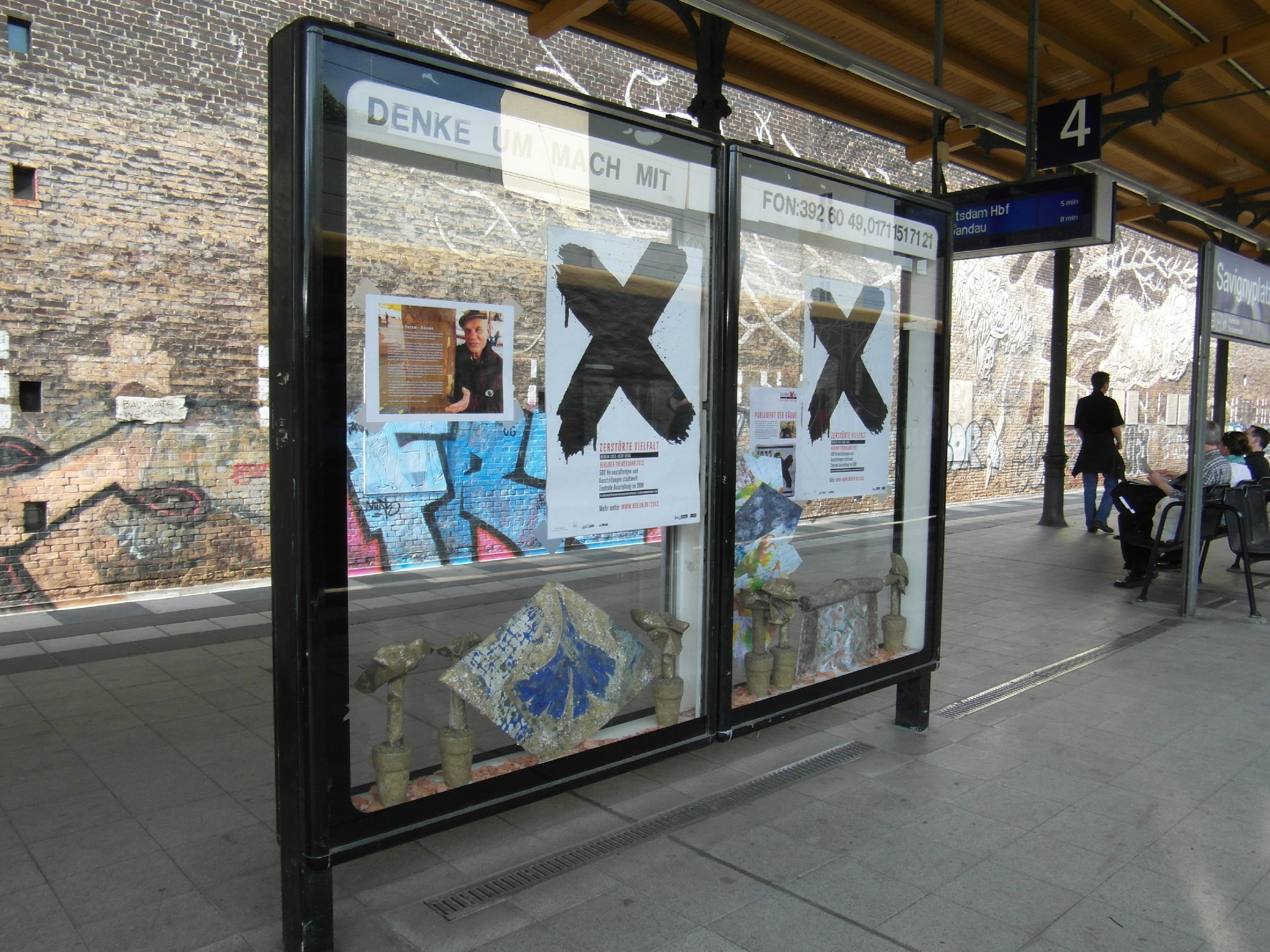
Savignyplatz station

== Publications ==
- Wagin, Ben (2015). Nenn mich nicht Künstler (in German). Berlin: Ch. Links. ISBN 978-3-86153-813-4.
- Wagin, Ben (2002). Ginkgo-Botschaften Berlin (in German). Berlin: Jovis. ISBN 3-931321-09-6.

== Awards ==
- 1985: Bundesverdienstkreuz
- 1996: Victor-Wendland-Ehrenring
- 2010: Verdienstorden des Landes Berlin
