= Vagin =

Vagin or (Russian: Вагин) is a Russian masculine surname originating from the word vaga (вага) with multiple meanings, its feminine counterpart is Vagina. Historical transliterations include Wagin (German) and Vaguine (French). The surname may refer to the following notable people:

- Merkury Vagin (died 1712), Russian Arctic explorer
- Vladimir Vagin (illustrator), Soviet and American illustrator
- Vladimir Vagin (footballer) (born 1982), Russian football player

== See also ==
- Wagin (disambiguation)
- Vaginov
