= Southern Berlin suburban railway =

Former German tramway company

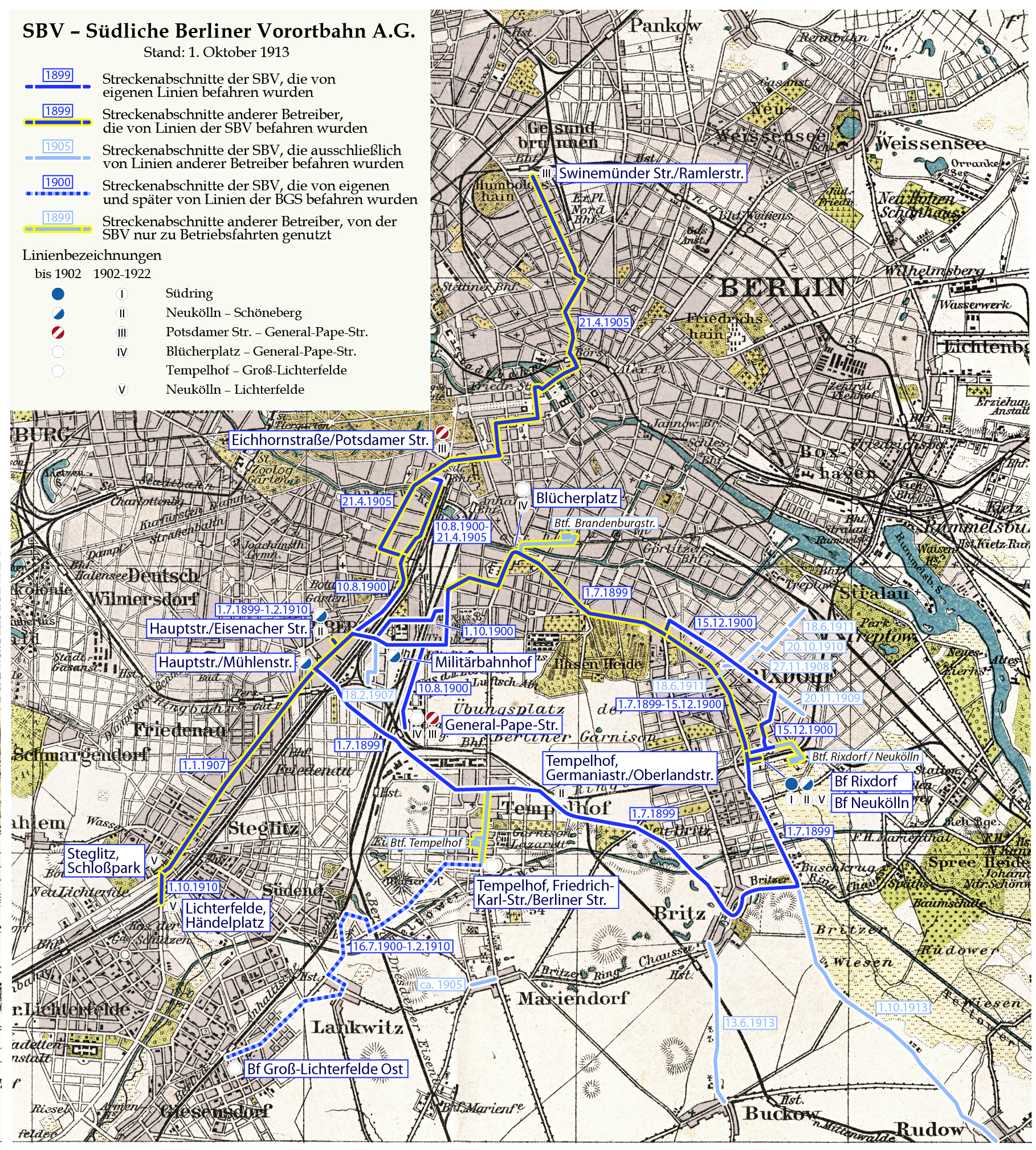
Route and line network of the Southern Berlin Suburban Railway

The Southern Berlin suburban railway or Südliche Berliner Vorortbahn A.G. (SBV) was a tramway company in the southern part of Berlin, whose lines primarily ran within the then-independent municipalities of Schöneberg, Rixdorf (later Neukölln), Tempelhof, and Britz. In addition, the company owned several lines that were exclusively used by vehicles operated by other companies. The fleet consisted of 30 railcars. Sidecars, depots, staff, and administration were owned by the Große Berliner Straßenbahn (GBS), which became the majority shareholder in 1910. SBV remained independent until 1919, when it was merged into GBS.

== History ==
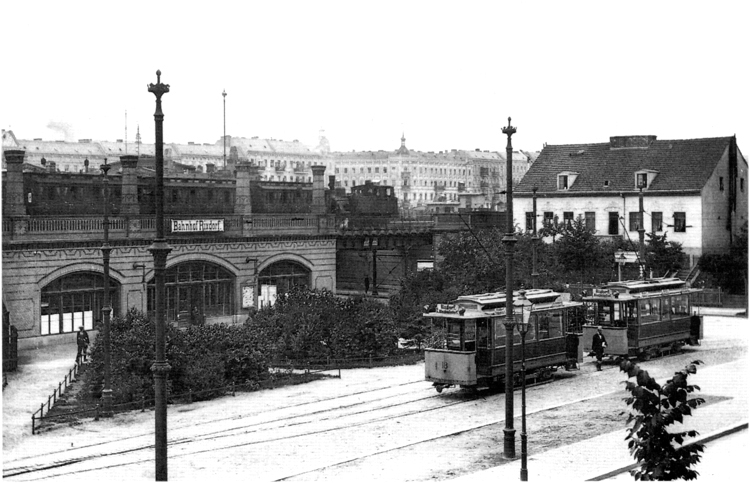
One of the few known photos of the Südliche Berliner Vorortbahn shows two Berolina carriages at Bahnhof Rixdorf station, 3 June 1901

The company was founded on 4 July 1898 with a share capital of three million Mark (adjusted for purchasing power in today's currency: around 25 million euros). Half of the share capital was held by GBS, and the other half by the Gesellschaft für Elektrische Unternehmungen. The company took over the contracts of the Südlichen Berliner Vorortbahn Konsortium, which had reached agreements with the municipalities of Britz, Lankwitz (whose municipal head, Friedrich Dillges, led the negotiations), Rixdorf, Schöneberg, Tempelhof, Treptow, and the city of Berlin. These municipalities were responsible for maintaining the railway line for the construction of a small railway. The approval contract for the city of Berlin was concluded until 31 December 1919, while the contracts for the other municipalities were valid until 1 July 1947. The state concession to operate the railway was issued until 1948. The operator was required to pay eight percent of the gross income to the city of Berlin each year, and if the net income exceeded six percent of the capital invested, half of the additional amount. No charges were to be paid to the other municipalities for the first five years. An annual payment of 70 Pfennig per kilometre of single track was to be made to the municipality of Rixdorf, and 20 Pfennig per kilometre to the other municipalities for pavement maintenance. SBV started the first construction phase between Britz and Tempelhof in November 1898. Operations began on 1 July 1899 on two lines. As with the GBS, these were marked with different coloured signal boards.

Line overview 15 December 1900
Line/Signal board	Course	Clock (in min)	Length (in km)
	„Südring“ Bf Rixdorf – Richardplatz – Hermannplatz – Kaiser-Friedrich-Platz – Blücherplatz – Bf Schöneberg – Kaiser-Wilhelm-Platz – Hauptstraße – Sachsendamm – Dorfstraße (Tempelhof) – Dorfstraße (Britz) – Buschkrug – Bf Rixdorf	24	21,2
	Bf Rixdorf – Hermannplatz – Kaiser-Friedrich-Platz – Blücherplatz – Bf Schöneberg – Kaiser-Wilhelm-Platz – Schöneberg, Hauptstraße/Eisenacher Straße	8–16	9,5
	Tempelhof, Friedrich-Karl-Straße – Bf Mariendorf – Bf Südende – Kaiser-Wilhelm-Straße – Bf Groß-Lichterfelde Ost	24	5,7
	Eichhornstraße/Potsdamer Straße – Dennewitzplatz – Kaiser-Wilhelm-Platz – Bf Schöneberg – General-Pape-Straße	18	5,3
	Eichhornstraße/Potsdamer Straße – Dennewitzplatz – Kaiser-Wilhelm-Platz – Bf Schöneberg – General-Pape-Straße	No data available	3,7

The first line, named Südring, was marked with blue signal boards and ran from Rixdorf station (Note: today: Bahnhof Neukölln) via Bergstraße, (Note: today: Karl-Marx-Straße) Blücherplatz (later part of Berlin), Schöneberg, Tempelhof, and Britz, before returning to Rixdorf. Because the section between Tempelhof and Britz passed through mostly undeveloped areas, the line quickly earned the nickname "Wüstenbahn" (Desert Railway). A second line, marked with white/blue signal boards, ran alongside the Südring from Rixdorf station to Schöneberg. The terminus was located at the intersection of Hauptstraße and Eisenacher Straße. The exact opening date is uncertain, recorded as either 1 October or 1 December 1899. Initially, the line ended at the military railway station in Kolonnenstraße. Shortly after opening, it was extended four days later to Hauptstraße and Mühlenstraße. (Note: today: Dominicusstraße) Between Rixdorf station and Yorckstraße/corner of Katzbachstraße, as well as between Kaiser-Wilhelm-Platz (Note: today: Richard-von-Weizsäcker-Platz) and the corner of Hauptstraße and Mühlenstraße, the GBS tracks were also used. It was noted that traffic would be restricted in the event of snowfall and completely canceled in the event of snowdrifts.

The route of the second line was slightly changed on 1 October 1900. On that day, a parallel route between Katzbachstraße and Kolonnenstraße via Kreuzbergstraße, Monumentenstraße, and Siegfriedstraße (Note: today: Czeminskistraße) began operations. On 15 December of the same year, a new route from Bergstraße via Richardplatz and Kaiser-Friedrich-Straße (Note: today: Sonnenallee) to Hermannplatz was put into operation for both lines within Rixdorf. The direct route via Bergstraße continued to be used by the GBS lines.

The third line of the SBV began operations a few months earlier, on 16 July 1900, and had no connection to the other two lines. It ran from Tempelhof, Friedrich-Karl-Straße/Berliner Straße, (Note: today: Tempelhofer Damm) via Mariendorf station, (Note: today: Bahnhof Attilastraße) Südende station, and Lankwitz, to Anhalter Platz (Note: today: Kranoldplatz) at Groß-Lichterfelde Ost station. (Note: today: Bahnhof Lichterfelde Ost) The line, marked with white signal lamps, was initially operated as a horse-drawn tram, as the cable installations could not be completed on time due to objections. After police approval in November 1901, the tram began operating electrically from 22 March 1902. The track infrastructure was entirely owned by the SBV.

Two more lines were introduced on 10 August 1900. The fourth line, marked with a red signal board featuring a white stripe, ran from the junction of Eichhornstraße / corner of Potsdamer Straße, via Dennewitzplatz and Kolonnenstraße, to General-Pape-Straße, near the Papestraße ring and suburban railway station. (Note: today: Bahnhof Südkreuz) The GBS tracks were used between the northern terminus and the junction of Mansteinstraße / corner of Großgörschenstraße. The fifth line, marked with white signal boards, ran from Blücherplatz to General-Pape-Straße. On 6 May 1902, it was combined with the Brunnenstraße - Kreuzbergstraße line of the GBS, forming the new line 41, Brunnenstraße - General-Pape-Straße, and operated as a connecting service. According to unconfirmed information, the fourth line is said to have been diverted via Yorckstraße, Katzbachstraße, and Dreibundstraße from this day onwards. At the end of 1902, the line returned to its original route.

Congruence of line designations
until 1902	1902–1922	from 1922
	I	6
	II	
	III	140
	IV	
	V	106

On 21 April 1905, Line III was extended via Potsdamer Straße, Leipziger Straße, Lindenkreuzung, Hackescher Markt, and Zionskirchplatz to the intersection of Swinemünder Straße and the corner of Ramlerstraße, in connection with the GBS. After the opening of the Lindentunnel, the line used the eastern part of the tunnel starting on 19 December 1916.

On 1 January 1907, Line V was established, with every second carriage on Line II running beyond the Eisenacher Straße terminus via Hauptstraße, Rheinstraße, and Schloßstraße to Steglitz, Schloßpark. On 1 October 1910, this line was extended via Chausseestraße (Note: today: Hindenburgdamm) to Lichterfelde, Händelplatz. The remaining carriages on Line II, on the other hand, began operating from 1 October 1910. On 1 February 1910, Line IV was extended to Tempelhof, Germaniastraße/Oberlandstraße to reinforce Line I, before being replaced that same day by GBS line 99. On the same day, Line IV was replaced by the GBS connection line 99. On Sundays, the line also ran to Steglitz, Schloßpark instead of Tempelhof if required. With the beginning of the First World War, Line II was discontinued on 3 August 1914. At the same time, Line I in Neukölln (formerly Rixdorf until 1912) was restored to its old route via Bergstraße and Berliner Straße.

On 28 May 1918, a new agreement was concluded between the Greater Berlin Association, which had been founded in 1911/1912, and GBS. Among other things, the agreement stipulated the merger of GBS with its branch lines. GBS had held all the shares in SBV since 1910. On 3 March 1919, the association meeting gave its approval to the project, which was implemented on 15 May 1919, or, according to other sources, on 26 April 1919. The Southern Berlin Suburban Railway, the Berlin-Charlottenburg Tramway, the Western Berlin Suburban Railway, and the North-Eastern Berlin Suburban Railway ceased to exist on this day. The accounting of the companies was standardized with retroactive effect from 1 January 1918.

On 11 May 1922, the remaining lines were integrated into the numbering system of the Berlin Tramway (BSt), which had emerged from GBS in 1920. At that time, the total route length was 37.29 kilometers, of which 19.63 kilometers were double-track. The operating voltage ranged from 500 to 550 volts of direct current.

Line overview 3 August 1914
Line	Course	Clock (in min)	Length (in km)
I	„Südring“ Bf Neukölln – Hermannplatz – Kaiser-Friedrich-Platz – Blücherplatz – Bf Schöneberg – Kaiser-Wilhelm-Platz – Hauptstraße – Sachsendamm – Dorfstraße (Tempelhof) – Dorfstraße (Britz) – Buschkrug – Bf Neukölln	30	20,2
III	Swinemünder Straße/Ramlerstraße – Vinetaplatz – Arkonaplatz – Zionskirchplatz – Hackescher Markt – Lindenkreuzung – Potsdamer Platz – Dennewitzplatz – Kaiser-Wilhelm-Platz – Bf Schöneberg – General-Pape-Straße	20	11,7
V	Bf Neukölln – Hermannplatz – Kaiser-Friedrich-Platz – Blücherplatz – Bf Schöneberg – Kaiser-Wilhelm-Platz – Hauptstraße – Rheinstraße – Schloßstraße – Chausseestraße – Lichterfelde, Händelplatz	15	14,3

== Other SBV routes ==
In addition to the lines already listed, the Südliche Berliner Vorortbahn built several lines that SBV never operated itself. The details of these lines are as follows:

- Around 1905: Mariendorf, Dorfstraße (Note: today: Alt-Mariendorf) – operated by GBS
- 18 February 1907: Kolonnenstraße/Sedanstraße – Gotenstraße – GBS Line 23
- 20 November 1909: Kaiser-Friedrich-Straße (between Hertzbergstraße and Teupitzer Straße) – GBS Line 65
- 27 November 1909: Kaiser-Friedrich-Straße/Wildenbruchstraße – Wildenbruchplatz – GBS Line 89
- 20 October 1910: Wildenbruchplatz – Elsenstraße/Heidelberger Straße – GBS Line 89
- 18 June 1911: Elsenstraße (between Heidelberger Straße and Görlitzer Bahn) – GBS Line 19
- 18 June 1911: Erkstraße (between Donaustraße and Kaiser-Friedrich-Straße) – GBS Line 19
- 13 June 1913: Britz, Chausseestraße/Triftstraße – Buckow West – GBS Line 28
- 1 October 1913: Britz, Buschkrug – Rudow – GBS Line 47

In addition, there were already installed tracks in the Wittelsbacherkorso (today: Boelckestraße) in Tempelhof. They were never used for their intended purpose and were removed again in the 1920s. The tracks built by SBV via Richardplatz and Bahnstraße were opened on 1 October 1899 and used exclusively by GBS.

== Car fleet ==
For the opening of operations in 1899, SBV purchased 30 railcars and gave them the car numbers 1 to 30. They were similar to the Berolina cars of GBS procured at the same time and had chassis of the Neu-Berolina type. The electrical equipment was procured from the Union-Elektricitäts-Gesellschaft (UEG). As these carriages were not sufficient for operation, the company had to borrow additional motor coaches and sidecars from GBS, as well as the horse-drawn carriages, which were used on the Lichterfelde line in the meantime. The use of four-axle Brandenburg railcars on Line III is well known, as these were equipped with the appropriate equipment for underground operation at the Unter den Linden boulevard crossing.

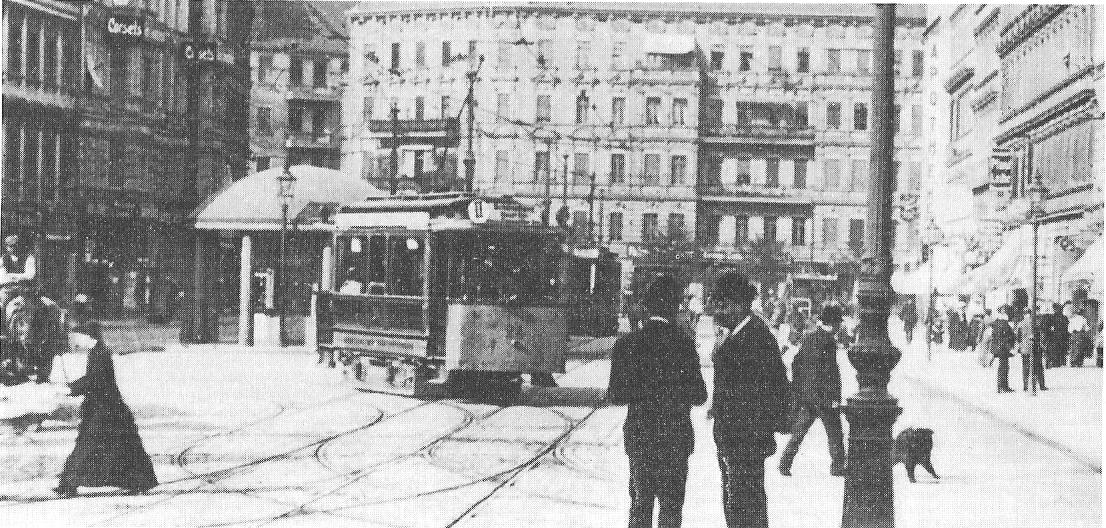
Railcar 24 on line II at Hermannplatz, around 1907

After the takeover by GBS in 1919, the railcars were given the new car numbers 3233–3262. It is known that carriages 3238, 3251-3256 and 3258 were converted into U3l carriages 3056^{II}–3063^{II.} (Note: not in this order) The conversion took place in 1922 at the National Automobile Company and is believed to have included other SBV cars as well. The remaining vehicles were either repurposed as work cars or decommissioned. The U3l coaches continued to be used for passenger transport until around 1934. Railcars 3056^{II} and 3059^{II} are known to have been subsequently converted for use as work carriages (A90II and A84, respectively). These two railcars were taken out of service in 1955 and 1954, respectively.

Maintenance was carried out on a rental basis in the GBS depots, as SBV did not have any comparable facilities. Initially, it was housed in the Brandenburgstraße depot, later also in the Rixdorf, Neukölln and Tempelhof depots.

== Operational Results ==
The share capital of the Südliche Berliner Vorortbahn (SBV) totalled three million marks, with half owned by the Große Berliner Straßenbahn (GBS) and the other half by the Gesellschaft für Elektrische Unternehmungen. GBS became the sole owner in 1910. As the company did not generate any profits, there was no reserve fund. The main reason for the losses was the routing through largely undeveloped areas. To improve the overall result, GBS took over the operation of Line IV, which became connecting line 99 starting in 1910. Line III, which was largely identical to the GBS tram line 40, is also said to have been completely taken over by GBS in 1908, but it is listed as an SBV line in 1911.

Operational statistics
Year	Track length (in km)	Pers. interviewed (in thousands)	Revenue (in Mark)	Car kilometres	Revenue/ Carriage-km (in Pfennig)	Pers./ Car-km	Deficit (in Mark)
1899	23,314	1756	177.209	731.757	24	2,40	–
1900	31,435	3417	346.276	1.604.973	22	2,13	113.821
1901	31,548	3241	322.360	1.949.159	17	1,66	425.497
1902	31,906	3305	326.622	1.825.823	18	1,81	685.762
1903	31,906	3615	366.462	1.839.511	20	1,97	855.237
1904	31,906	4043	397.268	1.834.713	22	2,20	986.760
1905	32,656	4441	437.349	1.827.362	24	2,43	1.079.170
1906	33,530	6213	614.376	2.373.155	26	2,62	1.188.286
1907	34,171	6990	712.468	2.718.642	26	2,57	1.315.697
1908	42,006	7431	763.630	3.017.711	25	4,46	1.420.891
1909	No data available	No data available	801.875	3.090.072	No data available	No data available	1.468.891
1910	No data available	9016	947.982	No data available	No data available	No data available	No data available

== Tariff ==
The fare on the individual lines was essentially based on the transport area they served. On Lines II, III, and IV, a standard fare of 10 Pfennig applied for an uninterrupted journey. For Line I, a 10 Pfennig fare applied for journeys within a single district (Weichbild) or to a second suburb, with 20 Pfennig for journeys beyond that. On Line V, which was operated in connection with the Westliche Berliner Vorortbahn, a partial route fare with tickets priced at 10, 15, and 20 Pfennig applied.

The 10 pfennig tickets were white, the 15 Pfennig tickets were pink, and the 20 pfennig tickets were green. From 1904, season and student tickets were issued according to the usual GBS principles. A monthly ticket for one line initially cost 7.50 Mark, for two lines 10 Mark, for three lines 13 Mark, and for the entire network 15 Mark. After the introduction of the ticket tax on 1 August 1906, the price increased to 7.70, 10.20, 13.40, and 15.40 Mark. Monthly student tickets for two lines were available for 3.00 Mark, with each additional line costing 1.00 Mark more. Workers’ weekly tickets, covering 12 journeys (six round trips), cost 1.00 Mark.

== See also ==
- Western Berlin suburban railroad

== Bibliography ==
- Wolfgang, Kramer; Siegfried, Münzinger (1963). Southern Berlin Suburban Railway. Berliner Verkehrsblätter.
- Grosse Berliner Strassenbahn (1911). Die Grosse Berliner Strassenbahn und Ihre Nebenbahnen 1902–1911 [The Great Berlin Tramway and its branch lines 1902-1911] (in German). Springer Berlin, Heidelberg.
