= Western Berlin suburban railroad =

Streetcar company in the greater Berlin area

The Western Berlin suburban railroad or Westliche Berliner Vorortbahn A.G. (WBV) was a streetcar company in the greater Berlin area, which mainly operated lines in the southwestern suburbs of Wilmersdorf, Schöneberg, Schmargendorf, Friedenau and Steglitz. After its foundation on June 25, 1898, the Aktiengesellschaft took over the operation of the Berliner Dampfstraßenbahn-Konsortium founded in 1888 on October 1 of the same year and pushed ahead with its electrification until 1900. The Große Berliner Straßenbahn took over the entire share capital of the company in the same year it was founded and from then on managed it in personal union. The affiliation enabled the company to expand its route network into the city of Berlin and thus improve its annual result in the long term. In return, the Große Berliner Straßenbahn was able to maintain its monopoly position in the Berlin streetcar sector. As part of the merger of the Berlin streetcar companies, the merger of the Große Berliner Straßenbahn with the Westliche Berliner Vorortbahn and other subsidiaries was completed on May 15, 1919; the company thus ceased to exist.

== History ==
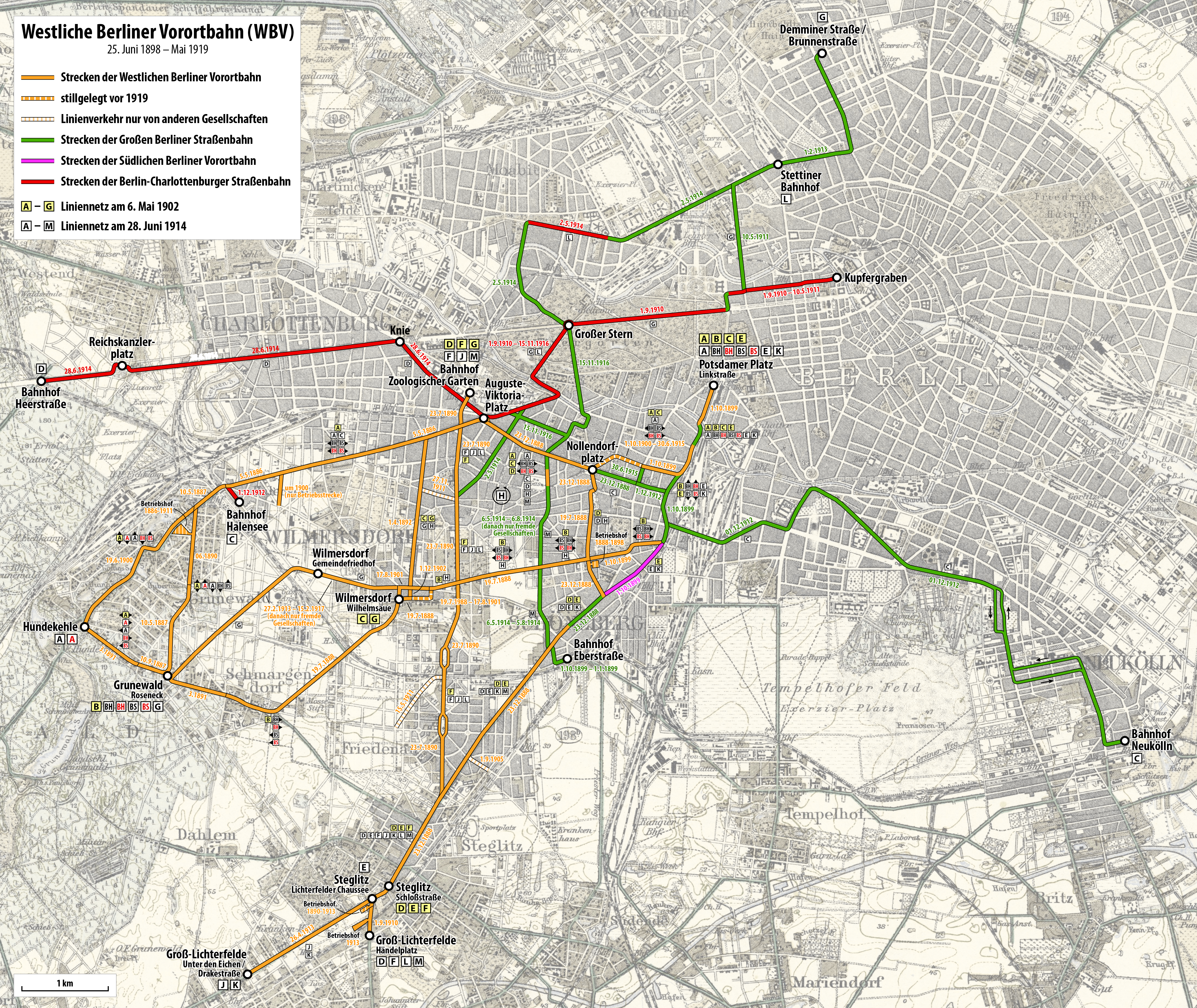
Route and line network of the Western Berlin Suburban Railway, 1898-1919

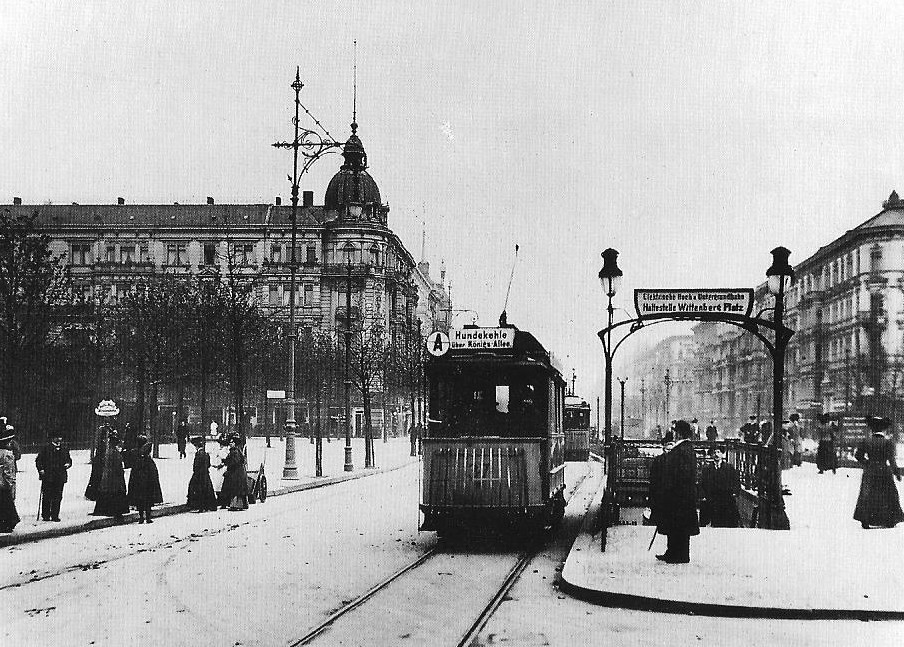
Railcar 37 at Wittenbergplatz with entrance to the elevated and subway railroad station, around 1905

The Westliche Berliner Vorortbahn was founded on June 25, 1898. On October 1, it was taken over by the Berliner Dampfstraßenbahn-Konsortium, which operated several lines in the south-western suburbs of Berlin. In the same year it was founded, the Große Berliner Straßenbahn (GBS) acquired the entire share capital of the company. From then on, GBS provided the personnel and administration. The WBV implemented the electrification planned by the steam streetcar consortium. It began on May 18, 1899, with the line from Zoologischer Garten via Nollendorfplatz, Schöneberg and Friedenau to Steglitz, which had been opened in 1888. On October 1, 1899, the connection from Nollendorfplatz to Linkstraße near Potsdamer Platz, approved in 1895, went into operation. All lines were electrified by August 10, 1900.

On September 17, 1900, the Berlin Police Commissioner granted the company a new concession until December 31, 1949. The content was essentially the same as a concession previously granted to GBS. As the City of Berlin had only given its approval for the use of municipal roads until the end of 1919, several legal disputes subsequently arose between the city and GBS and its subsidiaries. Consent agreements with the other municipalities affected by the railroad existed until 1937 and 1948 respectively.

Line overview May 6, 1902
Signal	Line	Course
Rot	A	Potsdamer Platz – Hundekehle / Grunewald, Roseneck – Potsdamer Platz
Blau	B	Potsdamer Platz – Wilmersdorf, Wilhelmsaue – Schmargendorf – Grunewald, Roseneck
Blau/Weiß	C	Potsdamer Platz – Wilmersdorf, Wilhelmsaue
Grün	D	Steglitz, Schloßpark – Schöneberg, Hauptstraße – Bahnhof Zoologischer Garten
Weiß/Grün	E	Steglitz, Schloßpark – Schöneberg, Hauptstraße – Potsdamer Platz
Weiß	F	Steglitz, Schloßpark – Kaiserallee – Bahnhof Zoologischer Garten
Weiß/Grüner Strich	G	Wilmersdorf, Wilhelmsaue – Uhlandstraße – Bahnhof Zoologischer Garten

Along with the electrification, the WBV expanded its network to two tracks throughout. The expansion was completed in the course of 1901. In addition, the route in the center of Wilmersdorf was changed so that through trains could run via Berliner Straße and Mehlitzstraße. The tracks in Wilhelmsaue were then used exclusively by trains turning there. In December 1902, the facility was converted into a block bypass.

When GBS took over operations management, the WBV introduced different colored line signals. In May 1902, these were replaced by code letters, whereby the company was assigned the range from A to M. At the time of the changeover, seven lines were in operation.

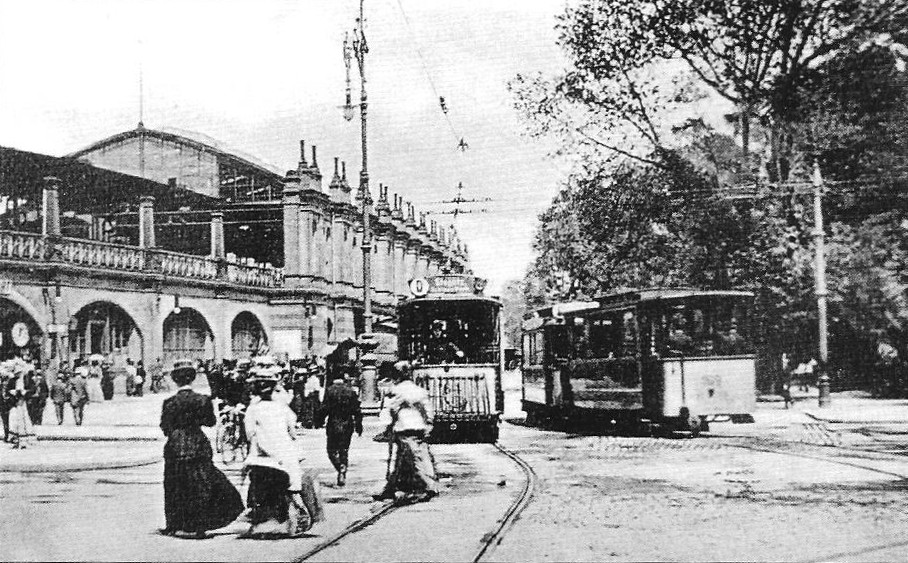
Railcar 64 on line D at Zoologischer Garten station, around 1905

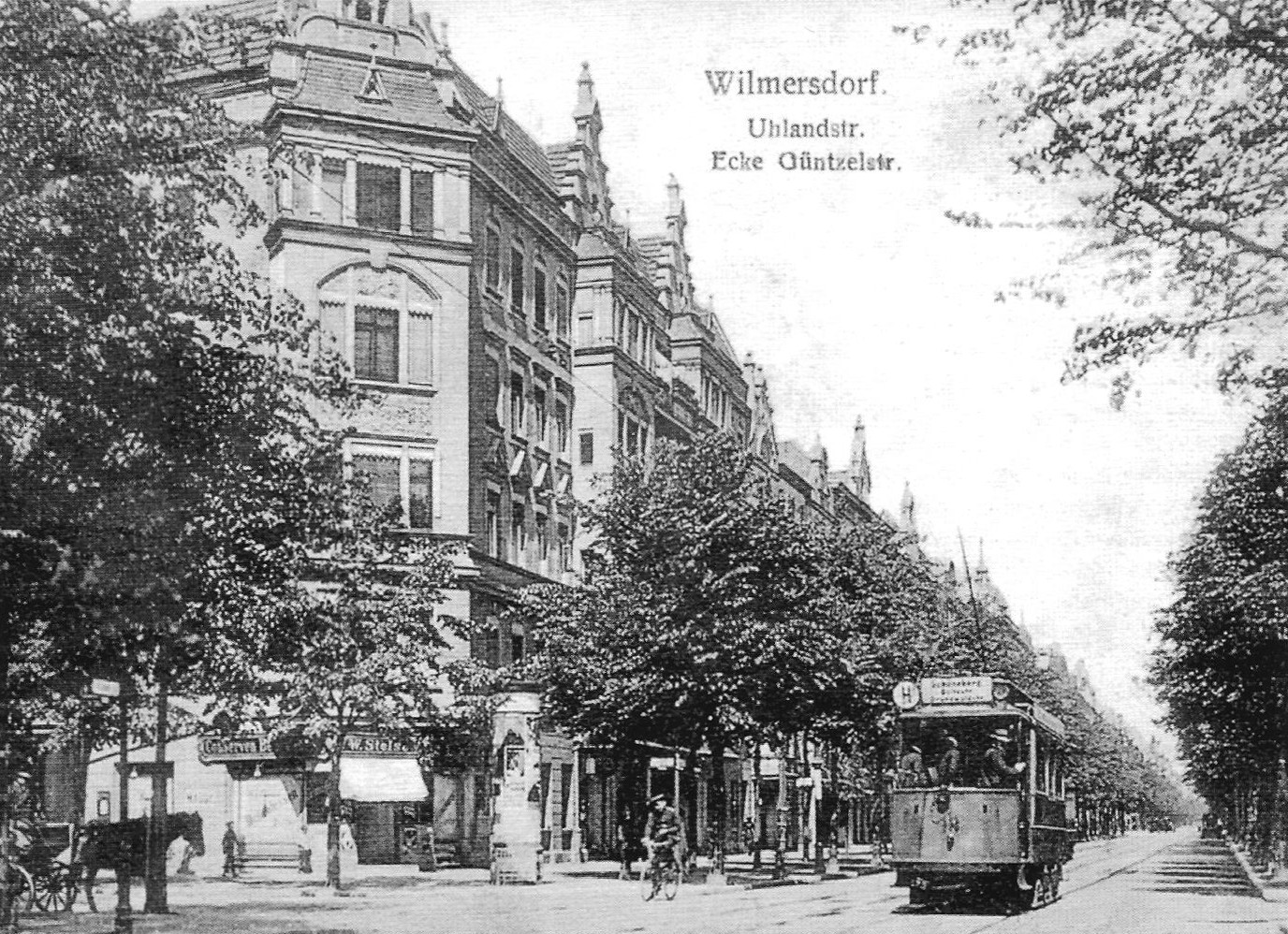
Railcar 18 in Uhlandstraße in Charlottenburg, around 1909

Passenger numbers continued to rise due to further settlement along Kurfürstendamm and in Grunewald. The opening of the Untergrundbahn in Tauentzienstraße and Kleiststraße did nothing to stop this. The WBV increased the frequency from 15 to 20 minutes to 10-15 minutes, with some services running every 7½ minutes. On line A, additional Amplifier trains ran between Potsdamer Platz and Bismarckplatz in Grunewald. On September 1, 1905, the WBV discontinued Line C and Line 52 of the GBS took over its duties. The line ran as a connecting service with the WBV. In the following years, GBS extended further lines into the WBV's transport area.

The network was extensively expanded between 1907 and 1914. On May 27, 1907, the company set up a ring line H, which ran under the name "Westring" from Schöneberg via Zoologischer Garten station and Wilmersdorf back to Schöneberg. September 1, 1910 brought with it three extensions. Firstly, lines D and E were extended from Schloßpark in Steglitz to Händelplatz in Groß-Lichterfelde. At the same time, line G was withdrawn from Bahnhof Zoo and re-routed via Lützowplatz, Großer Stern and Brandenburger Tor to Dorotheenstraße corner of Am Kupfergraben. Line B was also extended from Hagenplatz via Kurfürstendamm to Nollendorfplatz. In the same year, the Große Berliner Straßenbahn and Westliche Berliner Vorortbahn concluded a new consent agreement with the city of Wilmersdorf, which was valid until the end of 1999. In this agreement, the streetcar companies undertook to build twelve kilometers of new track each year and, depending on population growth, to further increase the frequency of services. In addition, the companies waived any objections to the upcoming rapid transit projects (in particular the Wilmersdorf-Dahlem subway line) and a possible expansion of bus services. In return, the city agreed to waive its rights to levy charges and a large part of the paving costs to be borne by the companies until 1950.

Line overview June 28, 1914
Linie	Course
A	Potsdamer Platz/Linkstraße – Nollendorfplatz – Kurfürstendamm – (loop ride: Koenigsallee - Roseneck - Hubertusallee or vice versa) - Kurfürstendamm - Nollendorfplatz – Potsdamer Platz/Linkstraße
BH	Potsdamer Platz/Linkstraße – Nollendorfplatz - Kurfürstendamm - Koenigsallee or Hubertusallee - Roseneck - Breite Straße - Berliner Straße - Grunewaldstraße – Potsdamer Platz/Linkstraße
BS	Potsdamer Platz/Linkstraße – Grunewaldstraße – Berliner Straße – Breite Straße – Roseneck – Koenigsallee oder Hubertusallee – Kurfürstendamm – Nollendorfplatz – Potsdamer Platz/Linkstraße
C	Bf Halensee – Kurfürstendamm – Nollendorfplatz – Yorckstraße – Bf Neukölln
D	Bf Heerstraße – Reichskanzlerplatz – Knie – Nollendorfplatz – Hauptstraße – Schloßstraße – Groß-Lichterfelde, Händelplatz
E	Potsdamer Platz/Linkstraße – Hauptstraße – Schloßstraße – Steglitz, Lichterfelder Chaussee
F	Bf Zoologischer Garten – Kaiserallee – Schloßstraße – Groß-Lichterfelde, Händelplatz
G	Demminer Straße/Brunnenstraße – Stettiner Bf – Brandenburger Tor – Großer Stern – Kurfürstendamm – Uhlandstraße – Berliner Straße – Hohenzollerndamm – Grunewald, Roseneck
H	Westring: Grunewaldstraße – Nollendorfplatz – Kurfürstendamm – Uhlandstraße – Berliner Straße – Grunewaldstraße
J	Bf Zoologischer Garten – Kaiserallee – Schloßstraße – Groß-Lichterfelde, Unter den Eichen/Drakestraße
K	Potsdamer Platz/Linkstraße – Hauptstraße – Schloßstraße – Groß-Lichterfelde, Unter den Eichen/Drakestraße
L	Stettiner Bf – Alt-Moabit – Großer Stern – Kurfürstendamm – Kaiserallee – Schloßstraße – Groß-Lichterfelde, Händelplatz
M	Bf Zoologischer Garten – Kurfürstendamm – Nollendorfplatz – Martin-Luther-Straße – Hauptstraße – Schloßstraße – Groß-Lichterfelde, Händelplatz

From May 10, 1911, Line G ran from Dorotheenstraße via Luisenstraße and Invalidenstraße to Stettiner Bahnhof. The line used the existing GBS tracks. In December 1911, a line through Berliner Straße in Wilmersdorf to Gemeindefriedhof went into operation, also served by Line G. On December 1, 1912, the company introduced a new Line C, which ran between Ringbahnhöfe Halensee and Neukölln. At the same time, the company extended Line B from Nollendorfplatz to Potsdamer Platz, creating a large loop line. In addition, the line ran alternately in both directions via Koenigsallee or Hubertusallee, so that from Potsdamer Platz there were four travel options to Grunewald. Similar to Line A, which served Koenigsallee and Hubertusallee as a loop route in both directions, the WBV marked the railcars with different destination signs. Cars that first traveled via Koenigsallee had red lettering on a white background, while cars traveling via Hubertusallee had black lettering on a white background.

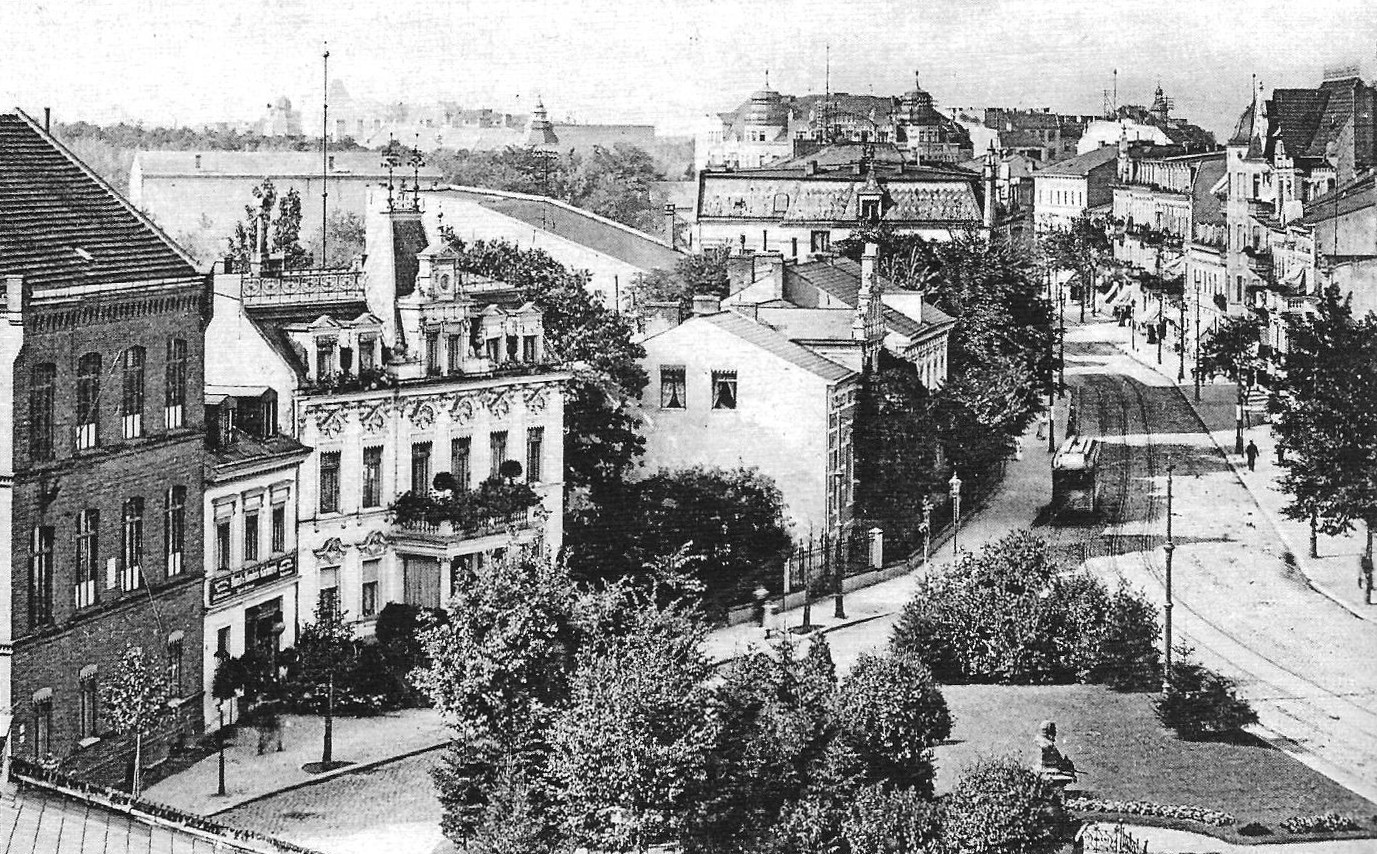
Railcar in Breite Straße in Schmargendorf, around 1910

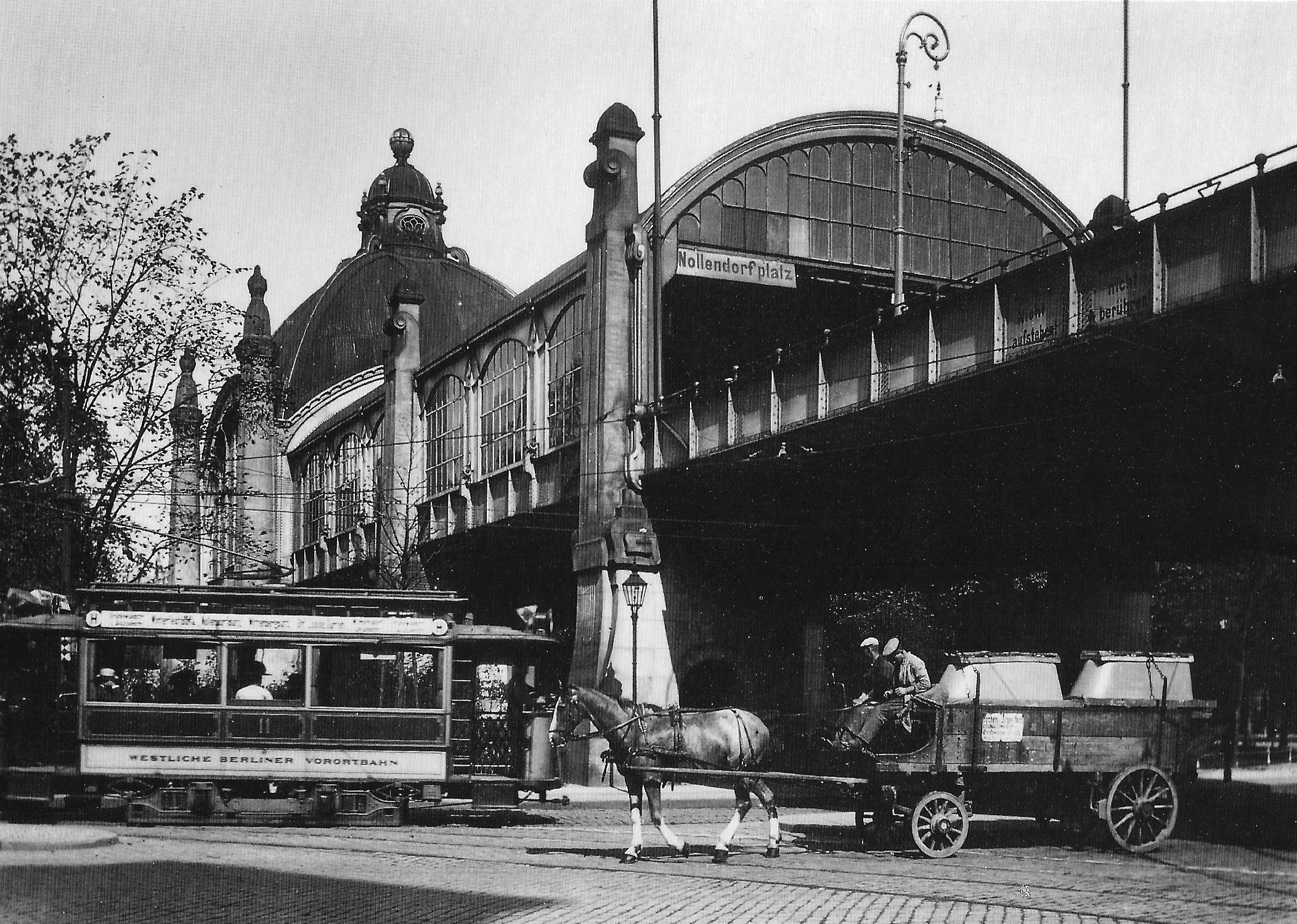
Railcar 11 at Nollendorfplatz elevated station, around 1910

The year 1913 also brought several changes. From February 1, line G continued from Stettiner Bahnhof to Gesundbrunnen, Demminer Straße Corner of Brunnenstraße. On February 27, the line was extended at the other end from the municipal cemetery via a new line along Hohenzollerndamm to Roseneck. On April 26, a line went into operation from Schloßpark through the street Unter den Eichen to the corner of Drakestraße. To serve the route, the WBV ran every second train on line F as line J. In addition, another line K ran from Potsdamer Platz via Schöneberg and Steglitz to the new terminus. One month later, the WBV split line B into lines BH and BS. The BH line ran from Potsdamer Platz first via Halensee, the BS line first via Schmargendorf. The split routing via Koenigsallee and Hubertusallee remained in place.

In May 1914, the Westliche Berliner Vorortbahn introduced two more lines. Line L, which was introduced on May 2nd, ran from Stettiner Bahnhof via Brandenburger Tor, Großer Stern, Kurfürstendamm, Nürnberger Straße, Kaiserallee and Schloßstraße to Händelplatz. Four days later, an M line was introduced between Bahnhof Zoo and Händelplatz via Schöneberg and Steglitz. The journeys on this line replaced every second carriage on line D. Line D for its part was extended on June 28, 1914, from Bahnhof Zoo via Hardenbergstraße, Bismarckstraße and Kaiserdamm to Bahnhof Heerstraße. It used the tracks of the Berlin-Charlottenburg tramway.

The outbreak of the World War I initially brought little change. On August 6, 1914, the company discontinued Line M, which had been established shortly before. The construction of Entlastungsstrecke der Hochbahn between the stations Gleisdreieck and Nollendorfplatz necessitated the removal of the streetcar from Motzstraße and Kurfürstenstraße; lines A, BH and BS were rerouted via Bülowstraße. A few months later, the WBV discontinued the BH line and shortened the BS line to the Potsdamer Platz - Roseneck via Schmargendorf route; in the course of 1917, it was again designated line B. From November 15, 1916, Line L ran via Lützowplatz instead of via Lichtensteinallee. Line G was withdrawn from Roseneck to the Wilmersdorf municipal cemetery on February 15, 1917, with line 57 of the GBS taking over service to Hohenzollerndamm.

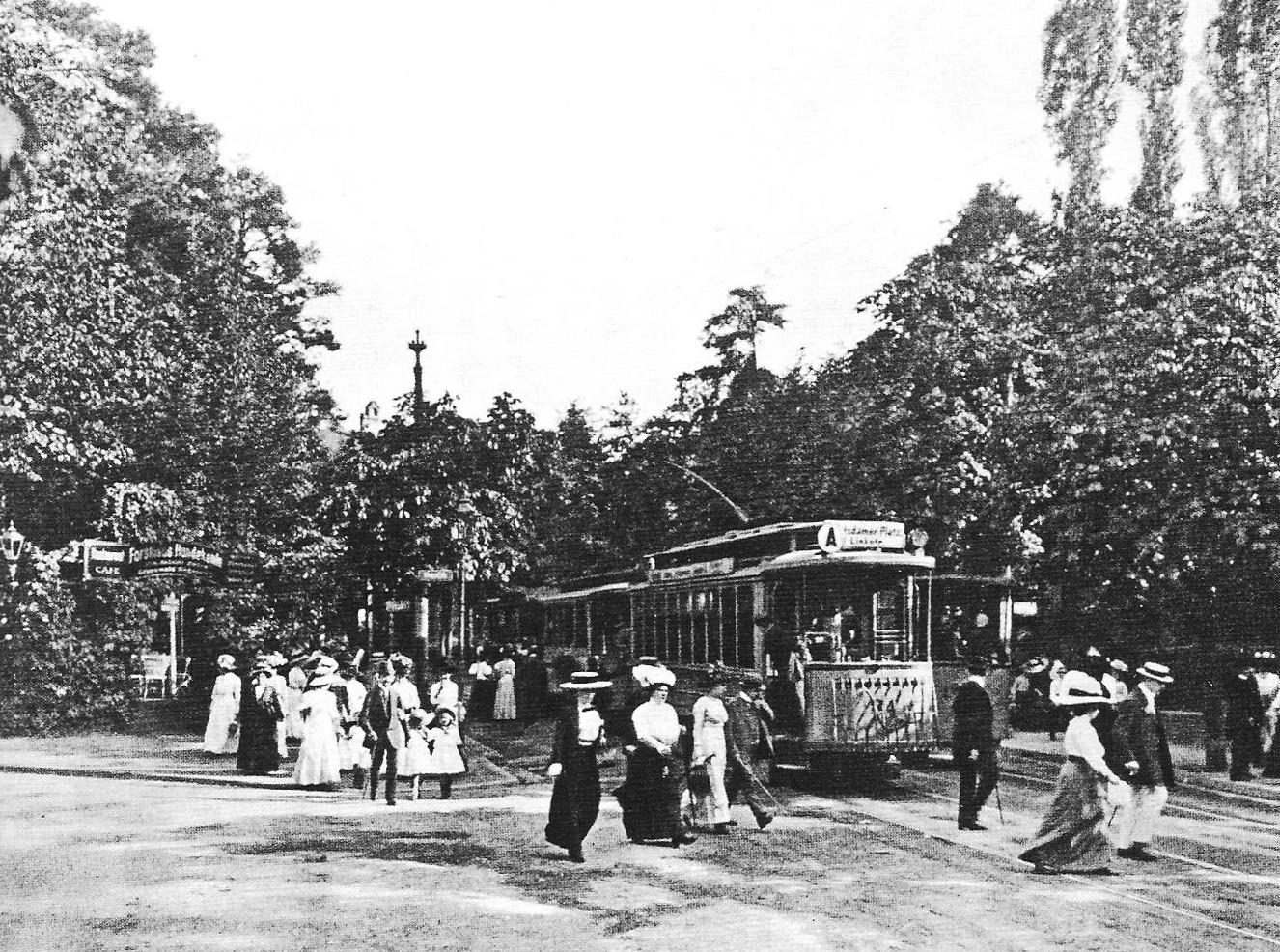
Railcar on line A at Hagenplatz in Grunewald, around 1911

In addition to the lines mentioned above, there were other sections of line owned by the WBV that were used exclusively by third-party railroads. The line from Kaisereiche to the corner of Rubensstrasse and Casanovastrasse, which opened on September 1, 1905, was owned by the WBV on Friedenau territory. On May 27, 1907, a line through Pariser Straße between Kaiserallee and Uhlandstraße went into operation. On November 27, 1911, this connection was extended beyond Olivaer Platz to Xantener Straße. The line was used exclusively by GBS lines. The route through the Südwestkorso opened on May 15, 1911, served line O of the Berlin-Charlottenburg Tramway (BCS). In the nearby Nestorstraße there was a service line to serve the Betriebshof XIII of the GBS.

On May 28, 1918, a new consent agreement was concluded between the Greater Berlin Association, founded in 1911/1912, and the Great Berlin Tramway, in which, among other things, its merger with its branch lines was stipulated. The association assembly gave its approval to the project on March 3, and the agreement, which was adopted at the general assembly on April 24, 1919, came into force on May 15, 1919. The Westliche Berliner Vorortbahn as well as the Berlin-Charlottenburger Straßenbahn, the Südliche Berliner Vorortbahn and the Nordöstliche Berliner Vorortbahn ceased to exist on this day. The accounting of the companies was standardized retroactively to 1 January 1918.

== The company ==
=== Operating results ===
The route network taken over by the Berliner Dampfstraßenbahn-Konsortium was essentially geared towards excursion trips to Grunewald. The fluctuations in demand between weekdays on the one hand and weekends on the other, as well as between the warm and cold seasons, were correspondingly strong. The establishment of connecting services with the Große Berliner Straßenbahn, the Berlin-Charlottenburger Straßenbahn and the Südliche Berliner Vorortbahn made it possible to extend the lines via the routes of these companies into Berlin city center. Added to this was the increase in population in the transport area, particularly in Charlottenburg, Wilmersdorf and Schöneberg. Between 1902 and 1911, the company more than doubled its income from ticket sales as well as passenger numbers. The good operating results were reflected accordingly in the dividend.

Operating results 1899...1917
Year	Gross revenue (in marks)	Gross expenditure (in marks)	Calculated surplus (in marks)	Annual result (in marks)	Track length (in km)	Income Personal income (in marks)	Number of people (in millions)	Car-km (in millions)	Revenue per wagon km (in Pf)	Person per car-km	Dividend (in percent)
1899					53,049	717.312	6,265	2,104	34	2,98	
1900	1.278.357	1.003.018	275.339	−132.820	56,510	1.250.776	11,172	3,838	33	2,91	
1901	1.576.783	1.251.860	324.923		67,913	1.560.061	13,230	4,415	35	3,00	
1902	1.600.250	1.265.953	334.297	−60.094	67,954	1.565.939	15,036	4,621	34	3,25	
1903	1.816.496	1.332.301	484.194	8.788	67,954	1.778.345	16,676	5,012	35	3,33	
1904	2.115.618	1.521.133	594.485	147.366	67,843	2.064.644	19,475	5,586	37	3,49	2,0
1905	2.398.518	1.682.223	716.282	293.118	68,864	2.327.515	21,939	6,253	37	3,51	4,0
1906	2.568.585	1.804.736	763.849	288.354	68,590	2.513.246	23,570	6,594	38	3,57	4,0
1907	2.900.652	1.988.949	911.703	407.788	68,890	2.833.421	27,123	7,533	38	3,60	5,5
1908	3.152.203	2.117.606	1.034.597	439.837	69,100	3.085.789	28,930	8,070	38	3,58	6,0
1909	3.458.604	2.207.226	1.251.377		69,329	3.391.169		8,691			7,0
1911						4.351.000	41				10,0
1912							46,600	11,575		4,03	
1917							61,500	11,382		5,40	

=== Tariff ===
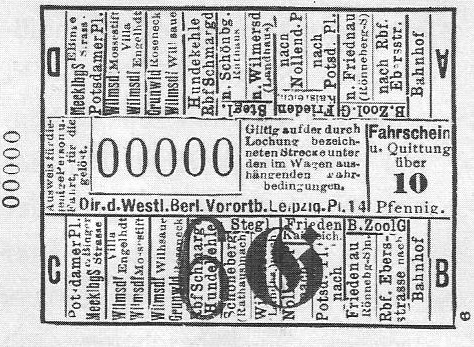
Sample ticket for a 10 pfennig domestic section of the Western Berlin Suburban Railway, around 1911

A staggered partial route fare of 10, 15 and 20 pfennigs applied to domestic services on the Westliche Berliner Vorortbahn. The sections were designed so that a fare of 10 pfennigs applied for journeys within the area bounded by Stadtbahn and Ringbahn. The inland fare was applied on most lines. Line G to Stettiner Bahnhof was operated in connecting service with the GBS, the fare applicable here was also graduated according to distance in 10, 15 and 20 Pfennig.

The 10 Pfennig tickets were white, the 15 Pfennig tickets were pink and the 20 Pfennig tickets were green. From 1904, Zeit- and Schülerkarten were issued according to the usual GBS principles. A monthly ticket for one line initially cost 7.50 Marks, for two lines 10 Marks, for three lines 13 Marks and for the entire network 15 Marks. After the introduction of the ticket tax on August 1, 1906, the price increased to 7.70, 10.20, 13.40 and 15.40 Marks. Monthly student tickets for two lines were available for 3.00 Marks, each additional line cost 1.00 Marks more. Workers' weekly tickets were issued for six times two journeys at a price of 1.00 Mark.

== Driving operation ==
=== Vehicle fleet ===
In October 1898, the WBV initially took over the wagon fleet of the Berlin Steam Tramway Consortium. The majority of the sidecars used for steam and horse-drawn operation were converted for electric operation. A series of 50 summer carriages still came from an order placed by the steam tramway consortium. Only one sidecar was newly procured in 1904. For the upcoming electrification, the company initially procured 56 two-axle railcars of the type Neu-Berolina. Five further carriages went to the steam tramway consortium as early as 1897. Railcar 42, delivered in 1901, was a nine-axle railcar with Maximum bogies, which was followed by a series of 25 further vehicles up to 1905. Railcar 63, delivered in 1903, was a one-off. In contrast to the older railcars, it had a compressed air brake, which was installed on all subsequent railcars in the following years. The railcars ordered from 1910 onwards, numbers 89-99 and 200–218, were ten-horse maximum railcars. The railcars all had open access platforms. They were transferred to the Berliner Straßenbahn fleet in 1920.

Vehicles of the West Berlin Suburban Railway

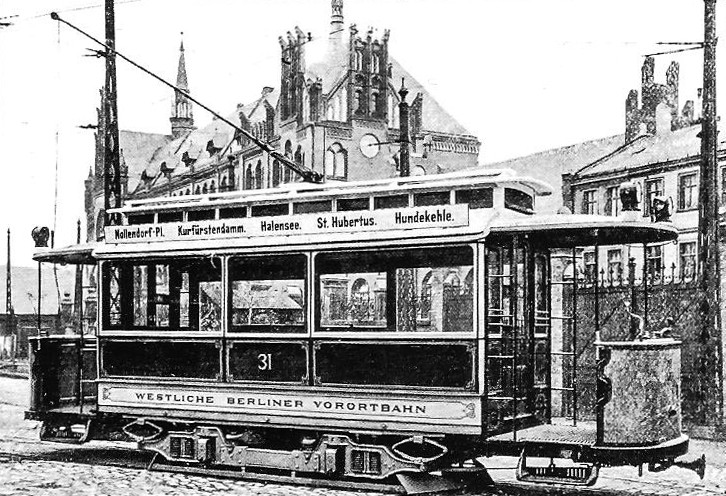
Railcar 31, around 1910

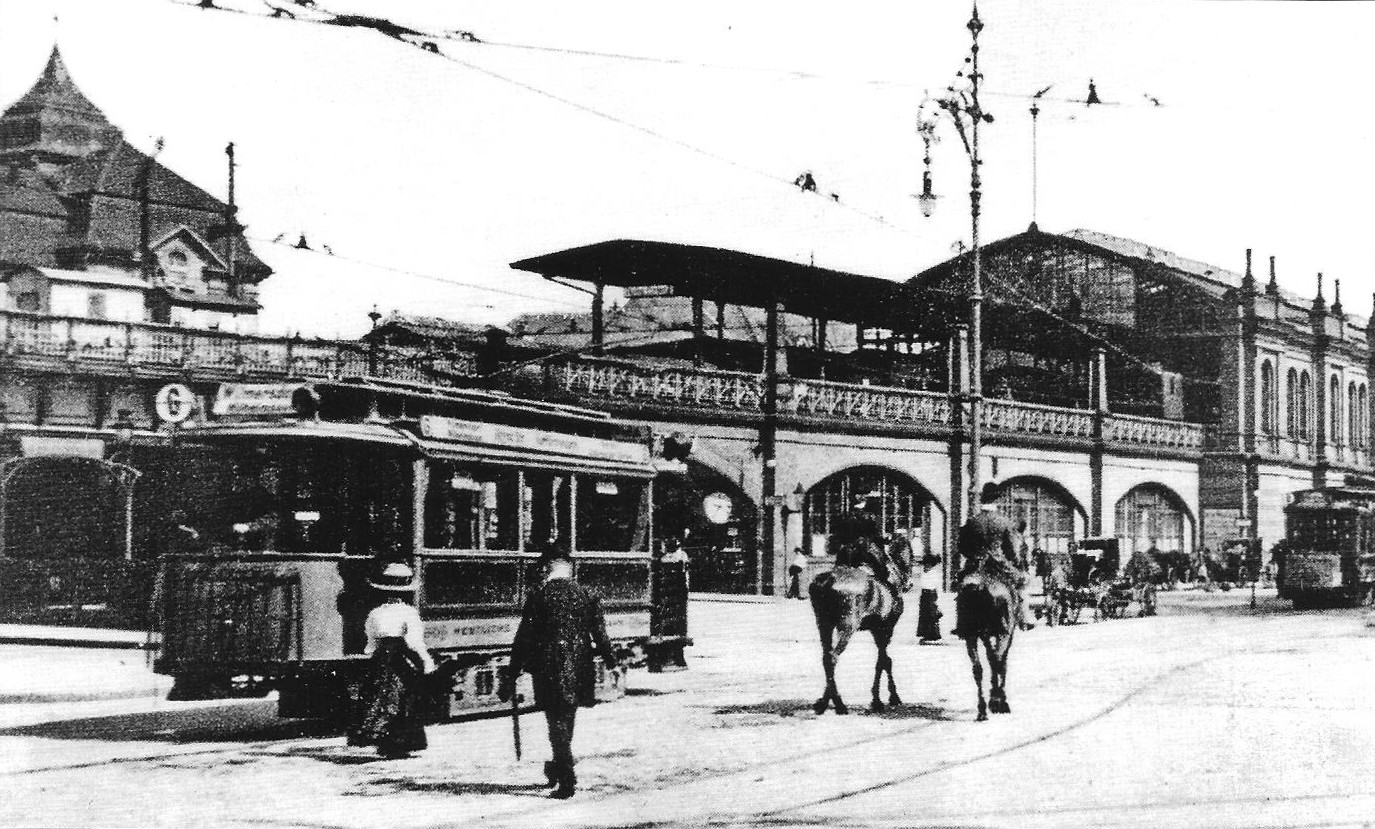
Railcar 37 at Zoologischer Garten station, around 1905

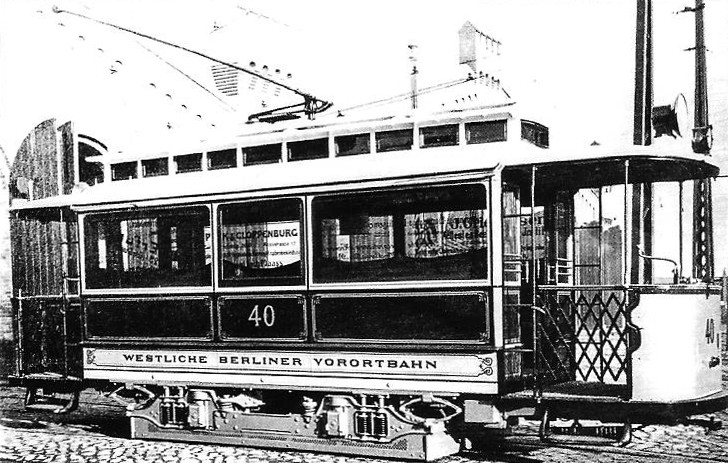
Railcar 40, around 1910

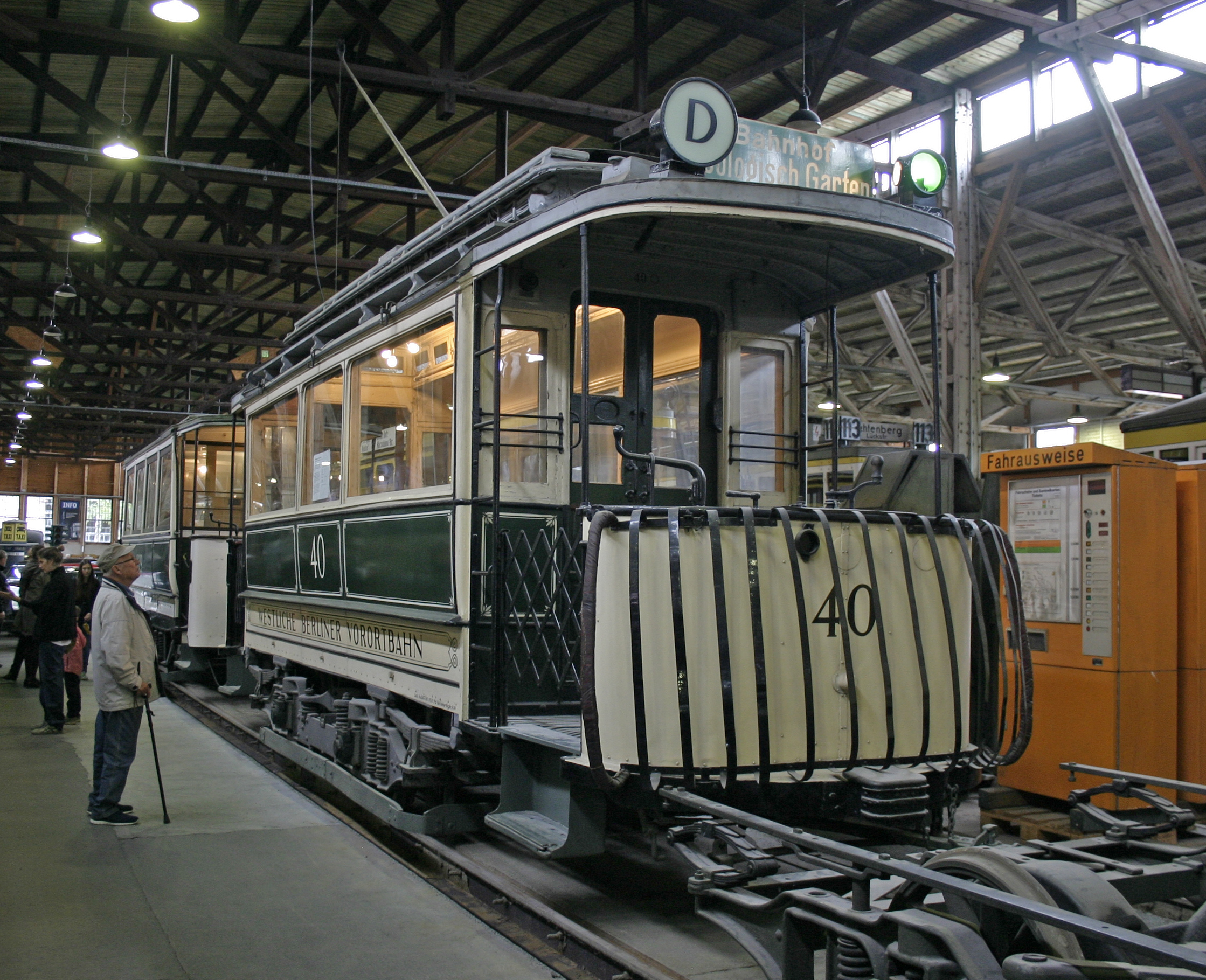
Railcar 40 as a historic vehicle in the DTMB vehicle collection, 2018

The following table provides an overview of the traction units and sidecars used in electric operation. For an overview of the vehicles used in steam and horse-drawn railway operation, see there.

Vehicle overview
Trolley number	Year of construction	Axles	Manufacturer (mechanical)	Manufacturer (electr.)	Seating	Standing room	Remarks
Triebwagen
1–41, 43–62	1897–1901	2×	Böker	AEG	20	14	1920 to Bst Tw 3229–3232, 3817–3871; until 1929 in ATw, Bw or decommissioned
42, 64–88	1901–1905	4×	Böker/ Falkenried	AEG	27		1920 to BSt Tw 4932–4957; decommissioned until 1929
63	1903	2×	Falkenried	AEG	22		1920 to BSt Tw 3872; decommissioned in 1929
89–99, 200–218	1910	4×	van der Zypen/ Falkenried	AEG	30		1920 to BSt Tw 5293–5322; 1925 partially closed platforms, open Tw decommissioned until 1936
Beiwagen
100–113	1886	4×	Herbrand	–	36		1898/1900 ex BDK Bw 1–5, 7–15; 1920 to BSt Bw 568–581; 1925 Bw 568–571, 573, 575, 577, 580 to ABw; remainder 1925 in BSt Bw 2041–2046, decommissioned 1928.
114–125	1889	4×	Herbrand	–	30		1898/1900 ex BDK Bw 40, 42II, 43–52; 1920 to BSt 582–593; 1925 Bw 587, 588, 592 withdrawn from service; remainder 1925 in BSt Bw 2047–2055, 1928 withdrawn from service.
126	1887		Weifzer	–	28		1898/1900 ex BDK Bw 36; 1920 to BSt Bw 594; 1924/25 to BSt ABw M1
127	1887	2×	Herbrand	–	40		Summer car; 1898/1900 ex BDK Bw 41; 1920 to BSt Bw 595; 1925 to BSt Bw 2056, 1928 to BSt ABw M1
128–177	1899	2×	Herbrand	–			Summer wagon, closed in 1900; 1920 to BSt Bw 864–913; until 1925 Bw 875, 886 decommissioned; remaining 1925 in BSt Bw 2260–2307, decommissioned around 1928
178	1904	2×	Böker	–	22	39	1920 to BSt Bw 1218; decommissioned in 1934

=== Depots ===
The WBV initially took over the depots operated by the steam streetcar consortium at Bismarckplatz in Grunewald, in Grunewaldstraße in Schöneberg and in Lichterfelder Chaussee in Steglitz.The Betriebshof I in Schöneberg was closed as part of the electrification in 1899 and its tasks were taken over by the Betriebshof X of GBS in Belziger Straße.

The depot II in Grunewald was located on a 22,560 square meter site in the Caspar-Theyß-Straße/Schinkelstraße/Koenigsallee street area west of Bismarckplatz. The courtyard, built in 1886, continued to be used after electrification until 1911. After the demolition of the high-rise buildings, the Reich Labor Service complex was built on the site in the 1930s. After the Second World War, the Telegraf newspaper and later the Umweltbundesamt used the premises.

The depot III in Steglitz remained in existence until 1913. As it quickly reached its capacity limit of 50 carriages, the WBV had a new depot built in the immediate vicinity, which began operations in November 1913. The new Steglitz depot was run internally as yard XI of the GBS. It offered space for 275 carriages. From 1935, the yard was also home to the O-Busse des Steglitzer Betriebssteils. In 1963 it was converted into a depot for buses; the yard performed these tasks until 1988. A car dealer has been using the halls since 2004.

== Literature ==
- Autorenkollektiv, Straßenbahn Archiv 5. Berlin und Umgebung, Berlin: transpress VEB Verlag für Verkehrswesen, ISBN 3-344-00172-8
- Michael Kochems (2013), Straßen- und Stadtbahnen in Deutschland. Band 14: Berlin – Teil 2. Straßenbahn, O-Bus, Freiburg im Breisgau: EK-Verlag, ISBN 978-3-88255-395-6
- Christian Winck (2015), Die Straßenbahn im Bezirk Charlottenburg-Wilmersdorf. 150 Jahre Straßenbahnverkehr in Berlin. 1865 bis 2015, Berlin: VBN Verlag B. Neddermeyer, ISBN 978-3-933254-30-6
