= Arkonaplatz =

Public square in Berlin

Coordinates: 52°32′14″N 13°24′07″E

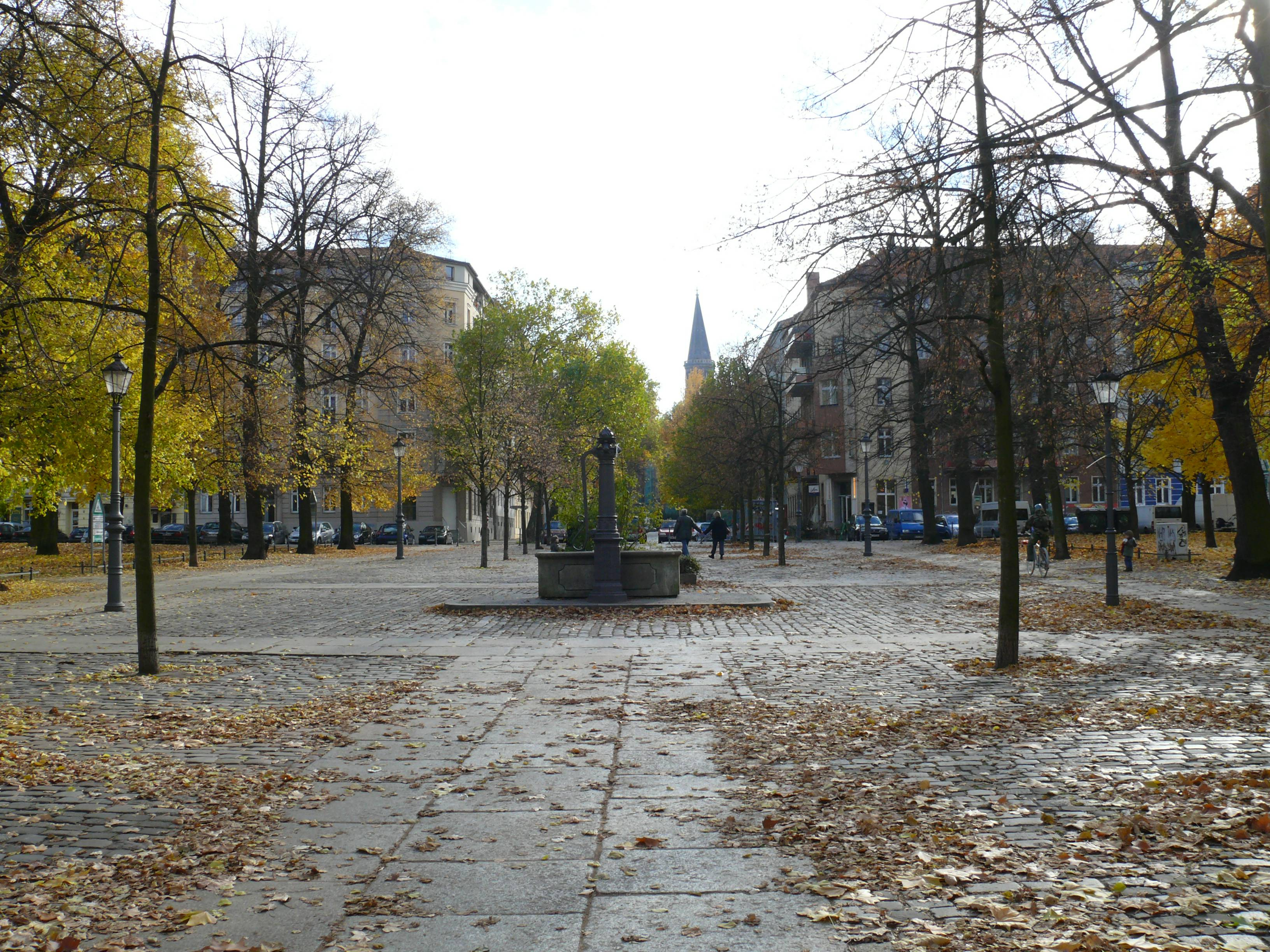
- Interactive map of Arkonaplatz
- Location: Berlin
- Area: Mitte

Arkonaplatz is a 1.5-hectare square in Berlin's Mitte district of the same name and is part of the historic Rosenthaler Vorstadt district. It was created in the middle of the 19th century.

== Location ==
Arkonaplatz is bordered by Granseer Strasse to the south, Wolliner Strasse to the east and Ruppiner Strasse to the west. In the north, Arkonaplatz extends to the houses, with house numbers 1-10.

== Naming ==
The town square was named after the steep coast of Cape Arkona on the island of Rügen by cabinet decision on 22 November 1875.

== History ==
Arkona Square was designed and laid out according to the Hobrecht plan as Square C of Department XI and according to the building regulations of 1853. In 1875, it received its name and the expansion together with the neighbouring streets into a residential area began.

Instead of the 1887 design by Hermann Mächtig as an ornamental square, Albert Brodersen added a children's playground to the square in 1918. Later, the magistrate ordered the square to be decorated with paintings. In 1927, a pelican and a seal made of shell limestone by Martin Müller, a penguin and an anglerfish by W. Schade, also made of shell limestone, and for the paddling pool four groups of children made of bronze by Georg Hengstenberg were set up. The square with its surroundings developed into a quarter for poor population groups. During the Second World War, about 1000 of the more than 4000 dwellings at its boundary were destroyed. The apartment buildings destroyed during the war were cleared away and new apartment buildings were built in their place in the 1950s and 1960s.

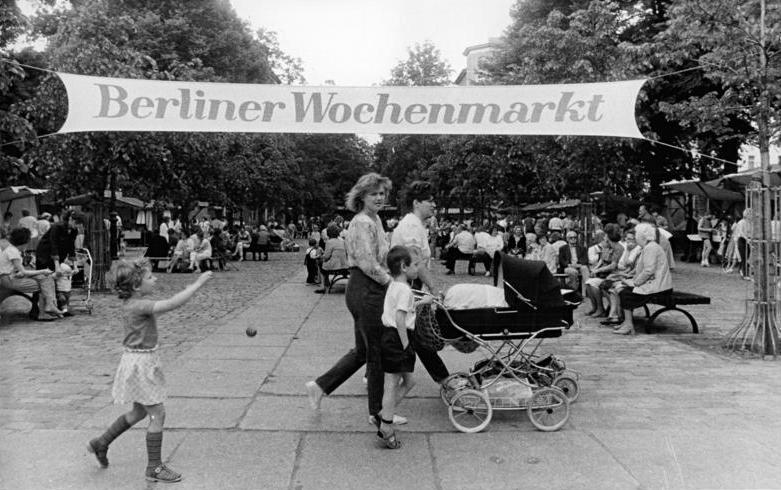
Weekly Market 1987

From the 1970s onwards, the GDR had the square extensively restored or partially modernized, and the areas were redesigned. On the occasion of the extensive redevelopment (then called reconstruction) of the residential area around Arkonaplatz, for example, the section of Swinemünder Strasse that runs across the (present) square was closed to public traffic and integrated into the square. A weekly market has been held here regularly since about 1985.

After the end of the GDR, the square developed into a preferred residential area for young families. Children use the spacious playground here, parents use the restaurants surrounding the square. Unlike fashionable neighbourhoods such as Helmholtzplatz and especially Kollwitzplatz in Prenzlauer Berg, as well as the areas of the Spandauer Vorstadt in Mitte, which are characterized by tourism, the square is considered quieter and has retained much of its original character.

== Structures and memorials ==
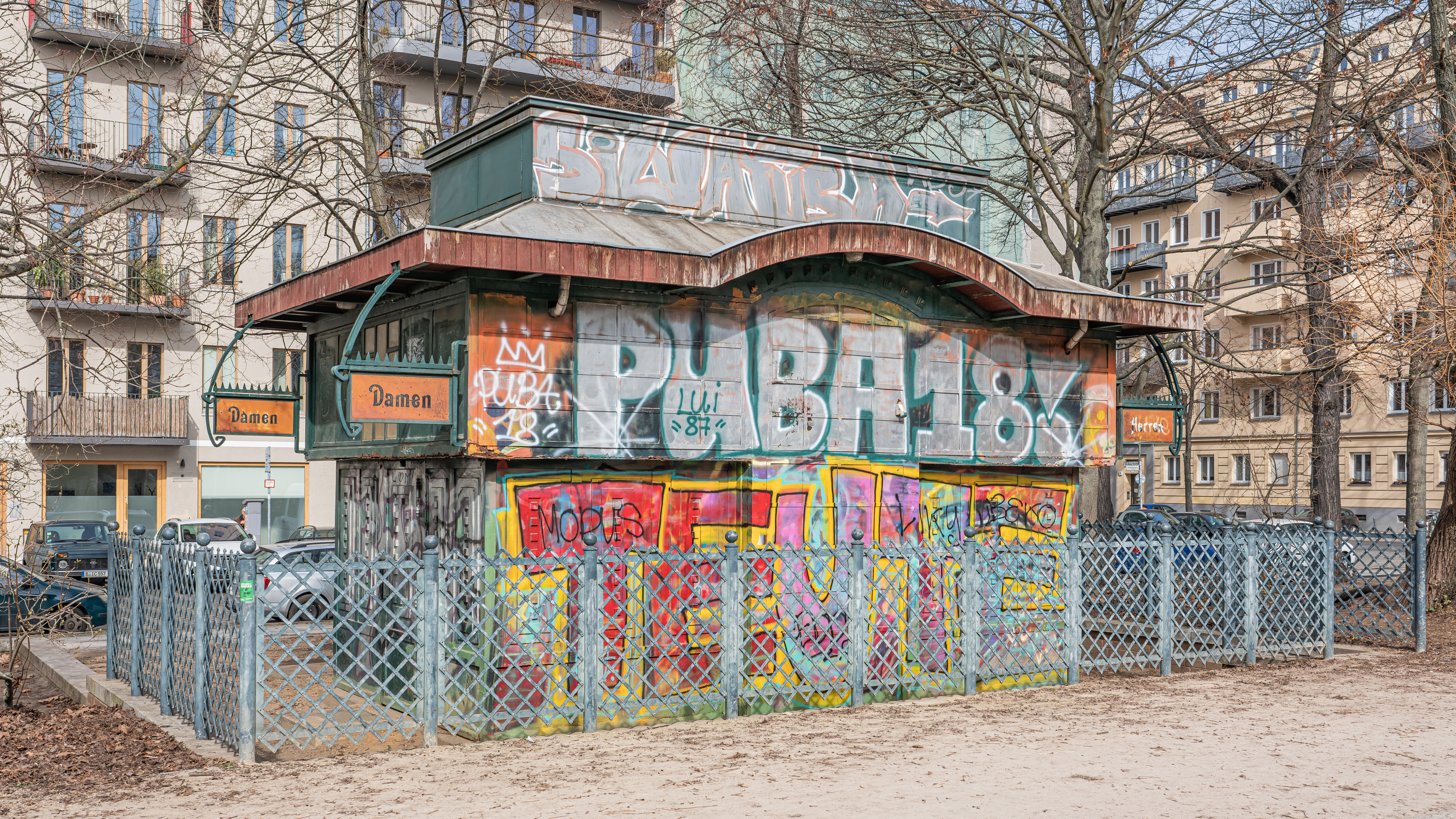
The abandoned toilet building at Arkonaplatz

On the west side of the square is one of the oldest school buildings in Berlin (now an elementary school "Grundschule am Arkonaplatz"), but it is not listed as a historical monument. On the east side is a disused historical toilet building.

Nearby is Zionskirchplatz, Bernauer Strasse, which was once shielded from the Berlin Wall, with the Mauerpark and the streets Kastanienallee and Oderberger Strasse in Prenzlauer Berg, which are characterized by gastronomy and retail.

After the end of the renovation measures in 1984, the entire residential area was handed over to the public in the presence of the GDR's head of state Erich Honecker. On this occasion, for example, 10 window displays were displayed in the former greengrocer's store in the house at Wolliner Strasse, which visibly distorted the reality in the stores of the GDR. For example, pineapples were displayed in the store windows, a fruit that was very rarely offered in the GDR. The day after Honecker's visit, the fruit had disappeared from the store windows.

According to a legend, the idea of founding Berlin's most famous soccer club, Hertha BSC, was conceived in 1892 by the brothers Fritz and Max Lindner and Otto and Willi Lorenz on a bench at Arkonaplatz, where they themselves often played soccer.

== Utilization ==
Beyond the Rosenthal suburb, the Sunday flea market at Arkonaplatz is well known. A weekly market is held every Friday. The playground is used by locals and visitors alike.
