= Zionskirchplatz =

Square in Berlin

Coordinates: 52.5347°N 13.4038°E

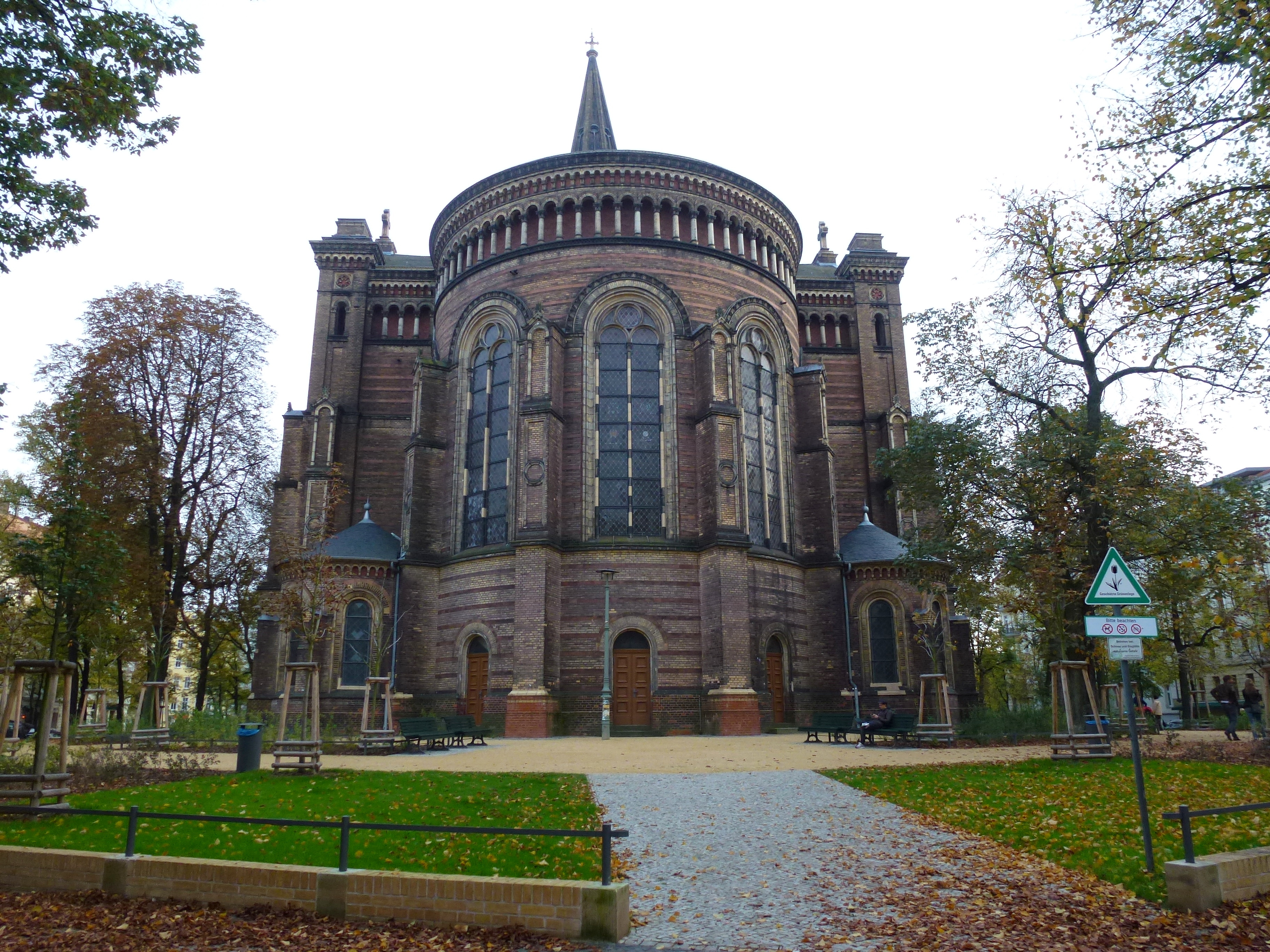
- Interactive map of Zionskirchplatz
- Location: Berlin
- Area: Mitte
- Created: 13 December 1866

Zionskirchplatz is a pentagonal square in the Rosenthaler Vorstadt, a district of Berlin's Mitte district. It is located on the approximately 53 meter high Veteranenberg, an elevation on the southwestern edge of the Barnim plateau and is registered as a garden monument with the number 09010210 in the Berlin State Monument List.

== History ==
Zionskirchplatz was created during the development of the new Berlin quarter based on the Hobrecht-Plan of 1862 in Department XI as Platz D. In accordance with the ideas of the Berlin City Council, the garden architect Joseph Pertl was commissioned to design the striking intersection of five streets in an appealing manner, at the same time as the neighbouring Arkonaplatz. It received its name in December 1866 with the construction of the Church of Zion (1866-1873) in the centre of the square. The square was designed as a decorative square with small paving and decorative strips of dark basalt stones, in which marble star ornaments mark the entrances to the interior of the square. Around the church, four densely planted rows of lime trees and between them strips of lawn formed a continuous green area. The square was initially protected by a wrought-iron grid that was closed at night.

In 1989, the District Office erected a bronze sculpture by Karl Biedermann to the side of the church in honour of the resistance fighter Dietrich Bonhoeffer, who had been active in the church and was later executed by the Nazis.

In the almost 150 years since the square was inaugurated, a number of changes and replantings have been made which deviated greatly from the original design plan. In 2013/2014, the Berlin Senate had the square redesigned at a cost of around 1.5 million euros, restoring the historic pathways with their visual axes and replanting trees with lime and chestnut trees.

== Utilization ==
Apart from walkers and churchgoers, the square directly in front of the church entrance was regularly used by an eco-market. When the weather is fine, the parish opens a café in front of the church on Sunday afternoons. On Sundays, visitors can climb up the stairs to the top of the church for a small fee. The 104 steps lead visitors to the top from where there are views over Prenzlauer Berg and Berlin.
