= Albert Wolff (sculptor) =

German sculptor and medallist (1814–1892)

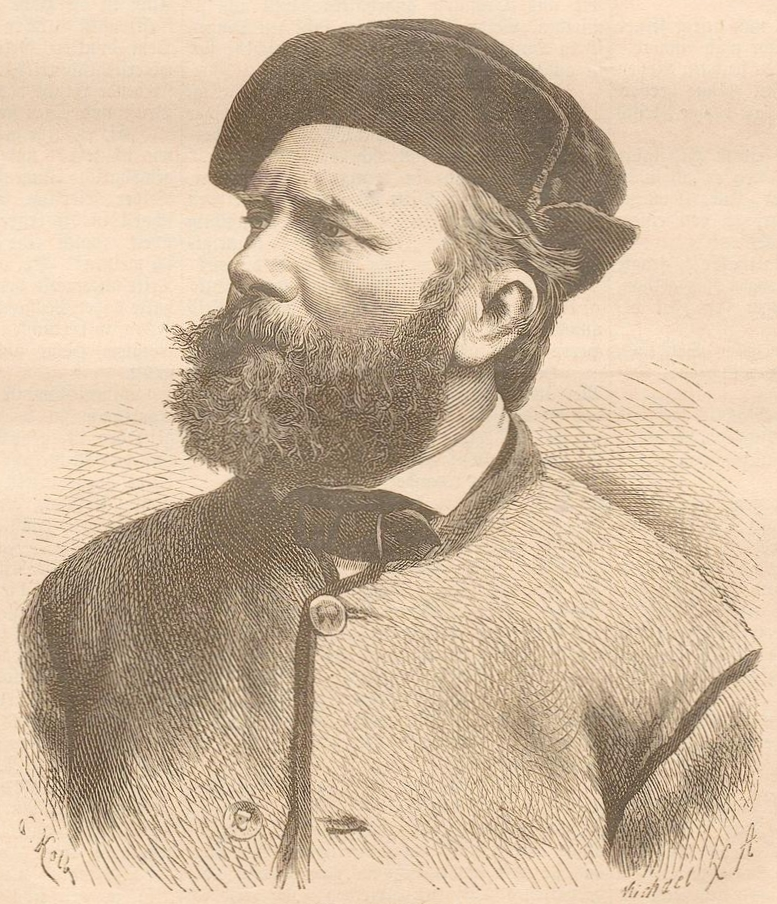
Albert Wolff, from the Darmstädter Tagblatt (Nr. 22/1886)

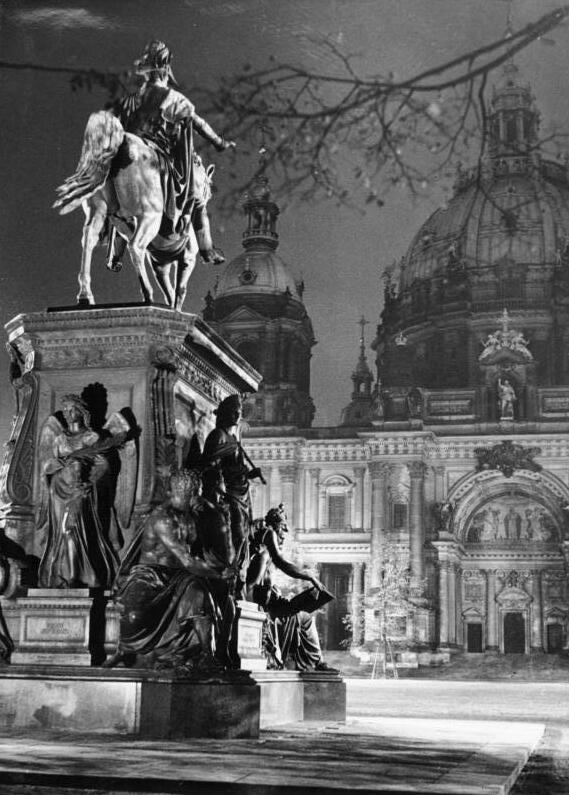
Friedrich Wilhelm III Monument (1938), from the German Federal Archives

Carl Conrad Albert Wolff (14 November 1814, Neustrelitz – 20 June 1892, Berlin) was a German sculptor, and medallist.

== Life and work ==
His father was the architect and sculptor Christian Philipp Wolff, who died when Albert was only six. At the age of seventeen, he followed in the footsteps of his older brother and moved to Berlin, where he found a position in the workshop of his father's friend Christian Daniel Rauch and took night classes in anatomical drawing at a local art school. In 1844, he was sent to Carrara (where the best marble could be found) to produce statues for the terrace of Sanssouci.

After two years in Italy, he returned to Berlin, assisting Rauch on a monument of Frederick the Great, but he also worked free-lance, producing a fountain with Countess Anna Raczynska (1823-1906) represented as Hygieia (in Posen) and a marble crucifix for a church in Kamenz. Shortly after, he opened his own workshop. In addition to his larger works, he produced many smaller figures, statuettes and decorations that were widely copied.

In 1866, he was appointed a Professor at the Prussian Academy of Art and had many students who would become well-known, including his own son Martin. He was named an honorary member of the Dresden Academy of Fine Arts in 1881.

== Selected major works ==
- Equestrian statue of Ernest Augustus, King of Hanover, in Hanover
- Equestrian statue of King Friedrich Wilhelm III with several base figures, in the Lustgarten, Berlin. The statue was unveiled on 16 June 1871. It was damaged during World War II and demolished by the German Democratic Republic (GDR) government. Die Allegorie der Wissenschaft (The Allegory of Science) and Clio – the Muse of History statues survived and are located near St. Nicholas' Church, Berlin.
- Statue of Grand Duke Friedrich Franz I in Ludwigslust.
- Figure, "Löwenkämpfer" (The Lion Fighter), at the Altes Museum. A copy may be seen at the Philadelphia Museum of Art.
- Figure group, "Der Jüngling wird von Athena in neuen Kampf geführt" (Young Man Led to a New Battle by Athena), on the Schlossbrücke (Castle Bridge) in Berlin-Mitte.
- Marble group, "Bacchus with Panther", in the Alte Nationalgalerie.
- Bronze relief of victorious troops at the base of the Berlin Victory Column.
- Bronze group, "Löwe seine Jungen gegen eine Riesenschlange verteidigend" (Lion Defending its Young Against a Giant Snake), on the square in front of the Criminal Justice Building in Moabit. It was later moved to the new Court Building on Wilsnacker Straße.
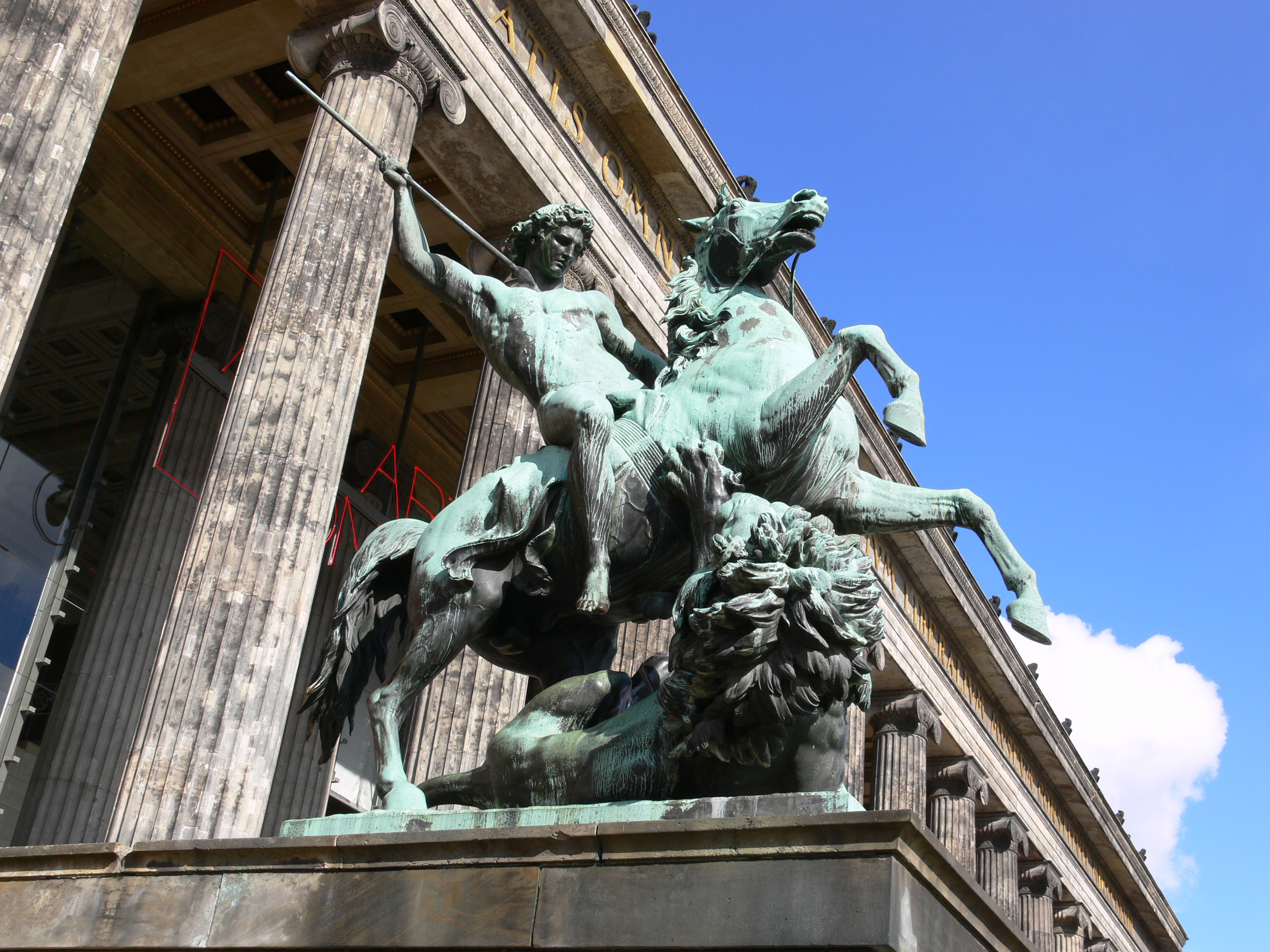
Löwenkämpfer

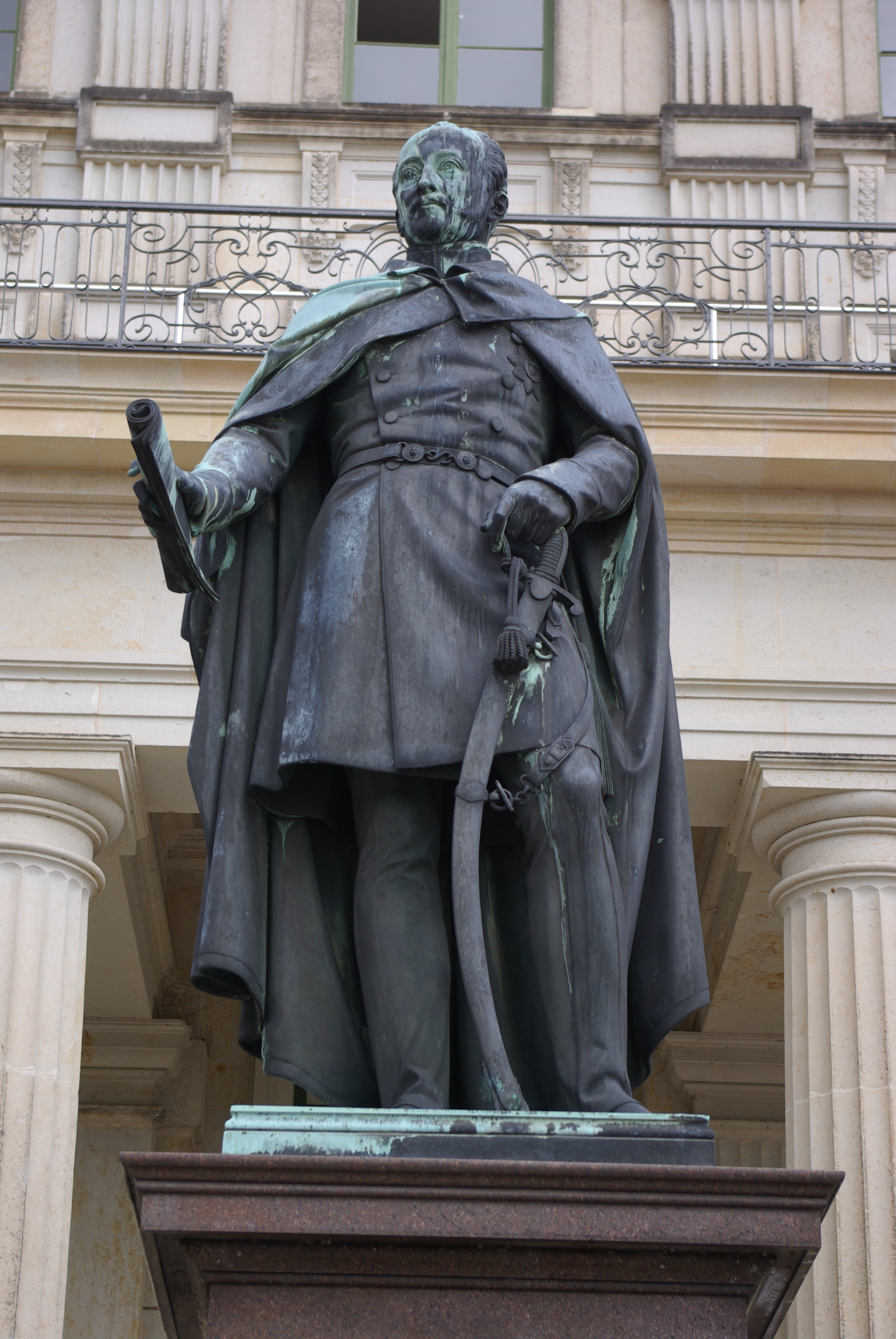
Friedrich Franz I

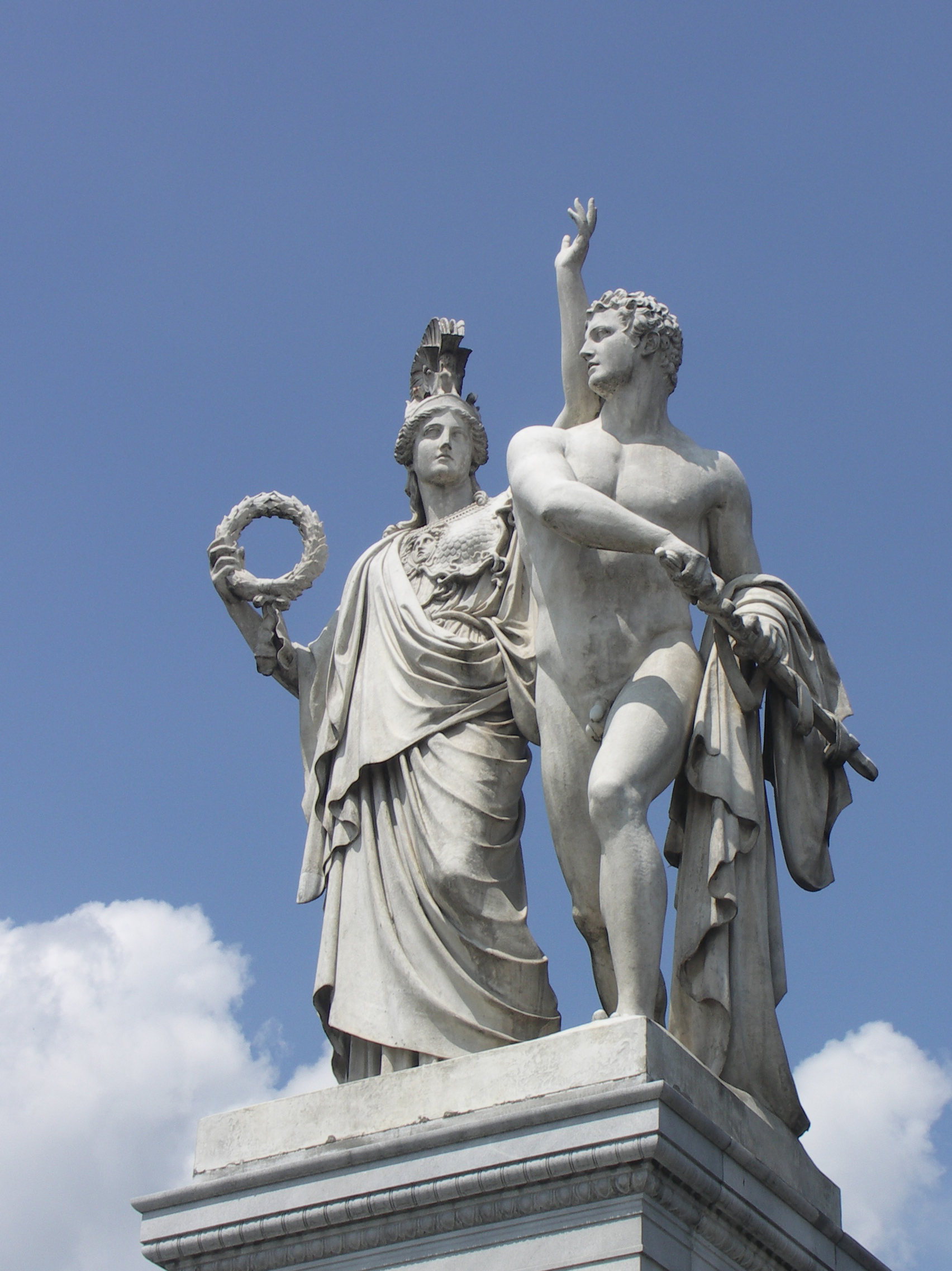
Der Jüngling wird von Athena in neuen
Kampf geführt

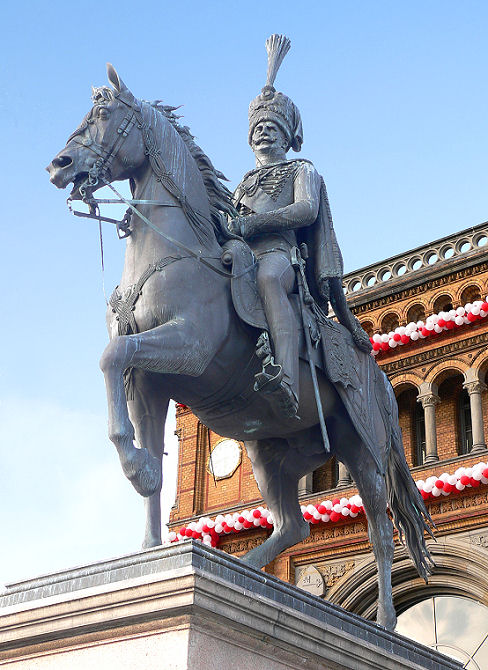
Ernst-August-Denkmal

== Illustrations/writings ==
- Gallerie bedeutender Leute. (Gallery of Distinguished People) – Düsseldorf : Arnz, 1855. Digitalized online by the University and State Library Düsseldorf.
