= Athena Protects the Young Hero =

Sculpture in Berlin, Germany

- Der junge Held wird von Athena beschützt (German)
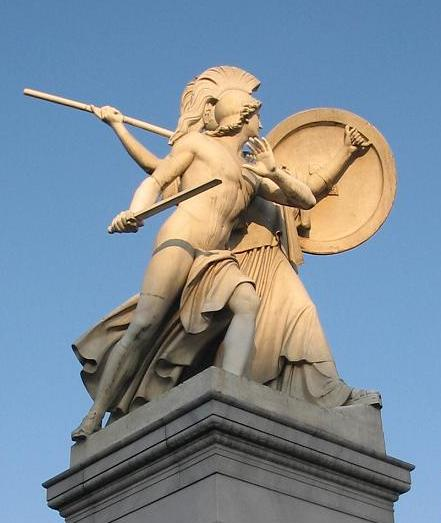
- The sculpture in 2006
- Artist: Gustav Bläser
- Year: 1854
- Type: Sculpture
- Location: Berlin, Germany; 52°31′04″N 13°23′55″E

Athena Protects the Young Hero (German: Der junge Held wird von Athena beschützt) is an 1854 sculpture by Gustav Bläser, installed on Schlossbrücke in Berlin, Germany.

== See also ==
- 1854 in art
- Greek mythology in popular culture
- Athenebrunnen
