= Athena Leads the Young Warrior into the Fight =

Sculpture in Berlin, Germany

- Der Jüngling wird von Athena in neuen Kampf geführt (German)
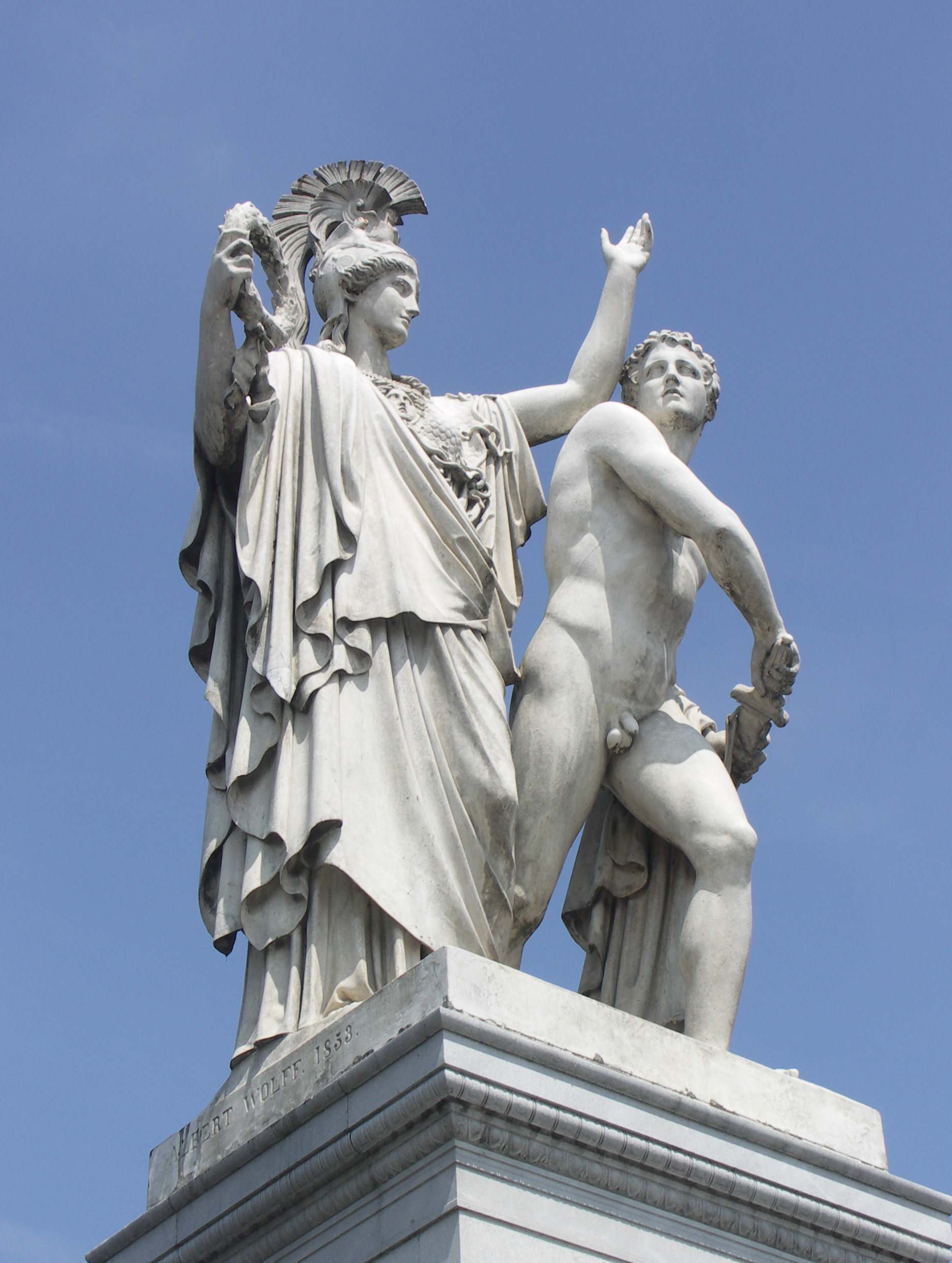
- The sculpture in 2007
- Artist: Albert Wolff
- Year: 1853
- Type: Sculpture
- Location: Berlin, Germany; 52°31′04″N 13°23′54″E

Athena Leads the Young Warrior into the Fight (German: Der Jüngling wird von Athena in neuen Kampf geführt) is an 1853 sculpture by Albert Wolff, installed on Schlossbrücke in Berlin, Germany.

== See also ==
- 1853 in art
- Greek mythology in popular culture
