= Friedrich Drake =

German sculptor (1805–1882)

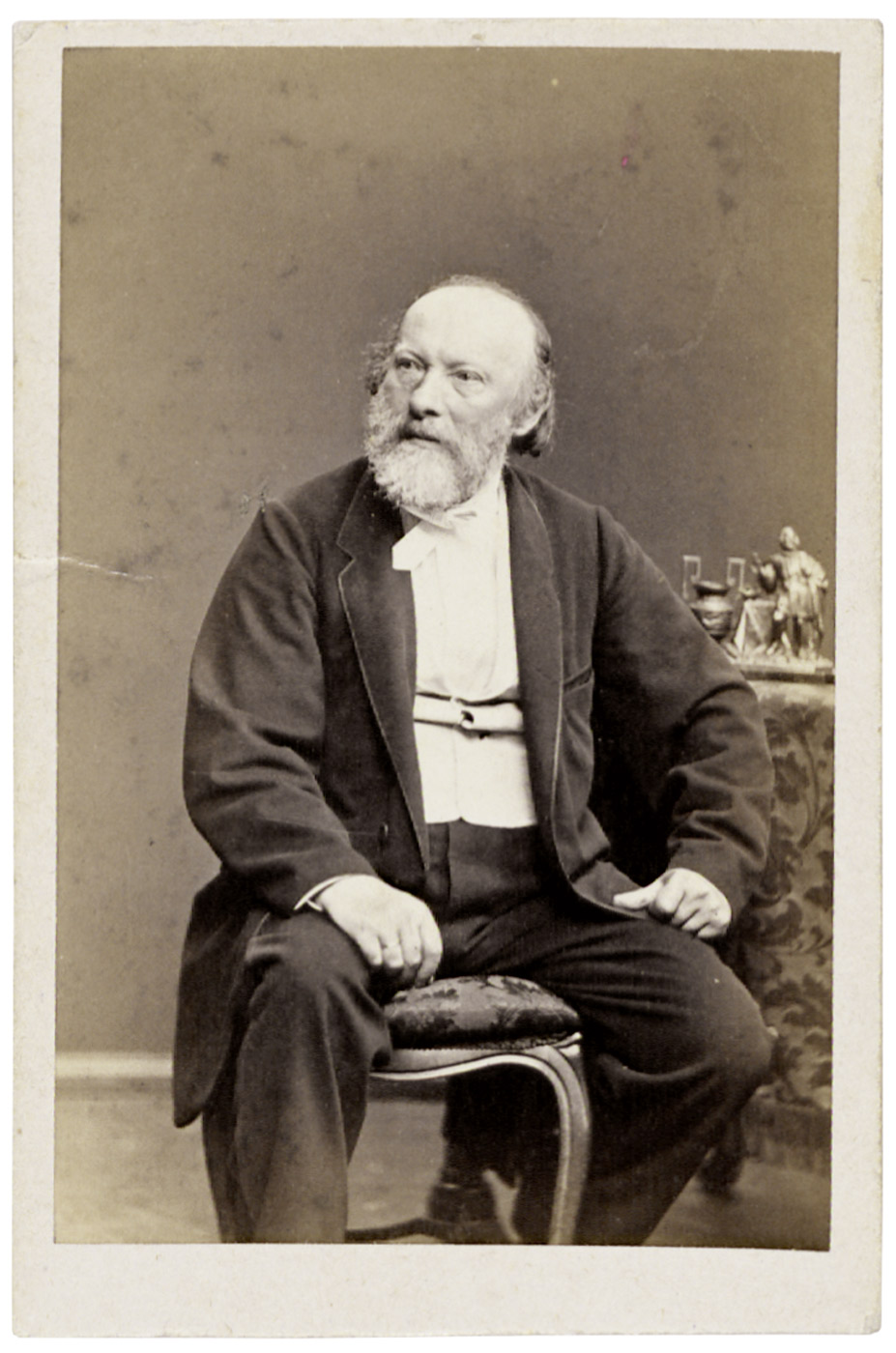
Friedrich Drake, c. 1860s

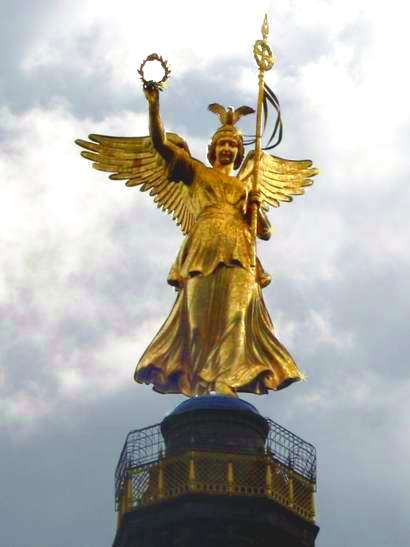
Victory on top of the Berlin Victory Column

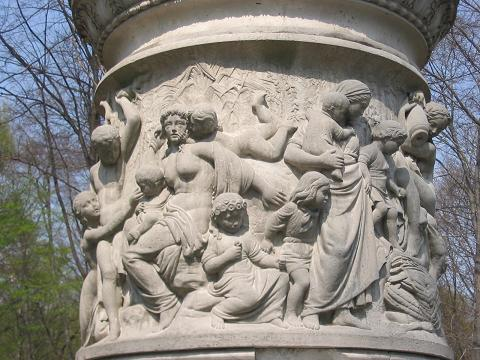
Detail on monument for King Frederick William III of Prussia in Berlin near Brandenburg Gate. 1849

Friedrich Drake (23 June 1805 – 6 April 1882) was a German sculptor and medallist, best known for his huge memorial statues.

== Biography ==
He was the son of a mechanic and served an apprenticeship as a turner in Minden, afterwards being employed in his father's workshop. While there, he made several clay models to amuse himself. A relative of Christian Daniel Rauch saw them and was impressed, so Drake was given a position in Rauch's Berlin studio.

His first major commission came in 1836. It was for a colossal statue of Justus Möser in the city of Osnabrück and paid his way for the traditional study trip to Italy. With a letter of recommendation from Rauch, he visited Bertel Thorvaldsen and presented him with engravings of his work. He returned to Berlin in 1837 and was appointed to the Prussian Academy of Arts. He quickly set up a workshop of his own, with his brothers Georg and Louis as assistants and his sister Karoline as the housekeeper. Karoline married the painter Friedrich Eduard Meyerheim and, in 1843, Drake married Lisette Schönherr, with whom he had six children.

In 1847, Drake was named a "Royal Professor" and, in 1863, he was awarded the Order of Merit of the Prussian Crown for Arts and Sciences. He became Vice-chancellor of the Academy in 1879. Using his experience as a trained mechanic, he invented a frame that enabled nude models to hold their poses.

During these years, his workshop was constantly busy producing sculptures of many well-known people, including a statue of Philipp Melanchthon in Wittenberg and a statue of Alexander von Humboldt in Philadelphia to mark the centenary of the Declaration of Independence. He married the Countess Marie of Waldeck in 1859, after his first wife's untimely death.

== Works ==
He executed numerous statues and busts of famous figures, including Lorenz Oken, Leopold von Ranke, Otto von Bismarck and Helmuth von Moltke the Elder. Other works include:

- Victory on top of the Berlin Victory Column. The statue was originally criticized for being too big and clumsy for the small column. In 1939, the column was widened.
- Eight Provinces of Prussia, represented by large allegorical figures.
- Dying Warrior crowned by Victory (1833)
- Madonna and Child, bought by the Empress of Russia
- Female Vine Dresser (National Museum, Berlin)
- Philipp Melanchthon monument on the market square at Wittenberg (dedicated 1865)
- Bronze equestrian statue of King William I of Prussia at Cologne. At the International Exposition (1867). This monument earned him the gold medal of the Legion of Honor.
- Bronze statue of King Frederick Wilhelm III in front of the Rathaus at Kolberg, Pomerania.
- Colossal bronze statue of Justus Möser, a German statesman, for Osnabrück (1836)
- Marble statue of the famous sculptor Christian Rauch (vestibule of the Neues Museum, Berlin)
- Statue of the famous architect Karl Friedrich Schinkel (1869)
- Marble group on the Schlossbrücke (Castle Bridge) representing "Warriors Crowned by Victory" (1850)
- Statue of Alexander von Humboldt (Philadelphia), 1871
- Prussian coin design and model for the Thaler 1871 Victory over France

== Other sources ==
- Rines, George Edwin, ed. (1920). "Drake, Friedrich" . Encyclopedia Americana.
- Gilman, D. C.; Peck, H. T.; Colby, F. M., eds. (1905). "Drake, Friedrich Johann Heinrich" . New International Encyclopedia (1st ed.). New York: Dodd, Mead.

Attribution
