= Gustav Bläser =

German sculptor

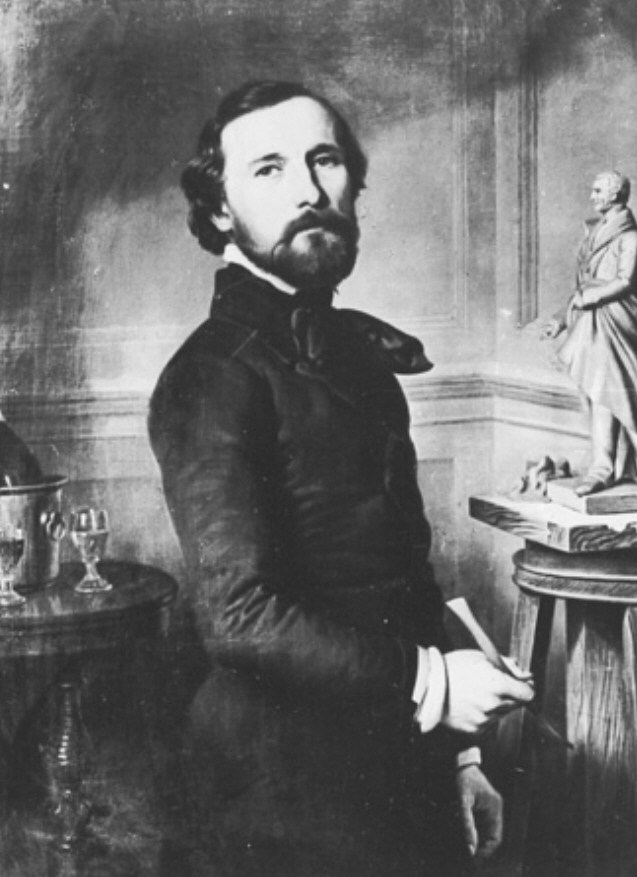
- 1853 portrait by Friedrich Keil
- Born: 9 May 1813; Düsseldorf, Rhine Province
- Died: 20 April 1874 (aged 60); Cannstatt, Stuttgart, German Empire
- Known for: Sculpture

Gustav Bläser (9 May 1813 – 20 April 1874) was a German sculptor.

== Biography ==
He was born in Düsseldorf, and in 1833 entered the studio of Christian Daniel Rauch, with whom he remained for eleven years. In 1845 he went to Rome, whence he was called to Berlin to design one of the eight marble groups adorning the Schlossbrücke, a task in which he was eminently successful. The group executed by him, and entitled “Minerva Leading a Youthful Warrior into Battle,” is considered the best of the series. His subsequent works include: “Saint Matthew, the Apostle,” a statue of colossal proportions (church at Helsingfors); “The Prophet Daniel” (Royal Castle, Berlin); “Borussia” (New Museum, Berlin); the equestrian statue of Frederick William IV (Rhine Bridge, Cologne); “Hospitality” (National Gallery, Berlin); and busts of Emperor William I, the Empress of Russia, von Alvensleben, von der Heydt, Alexander von Humboldt, Rauch, Abraham Lincoln (Washington, D.C.), and many others.
