= Statue of Alexander von Humboldt (Philadelphia) =

Statue in Philadelphia, Pennsylvania, US

Alexander von Humboldt statue
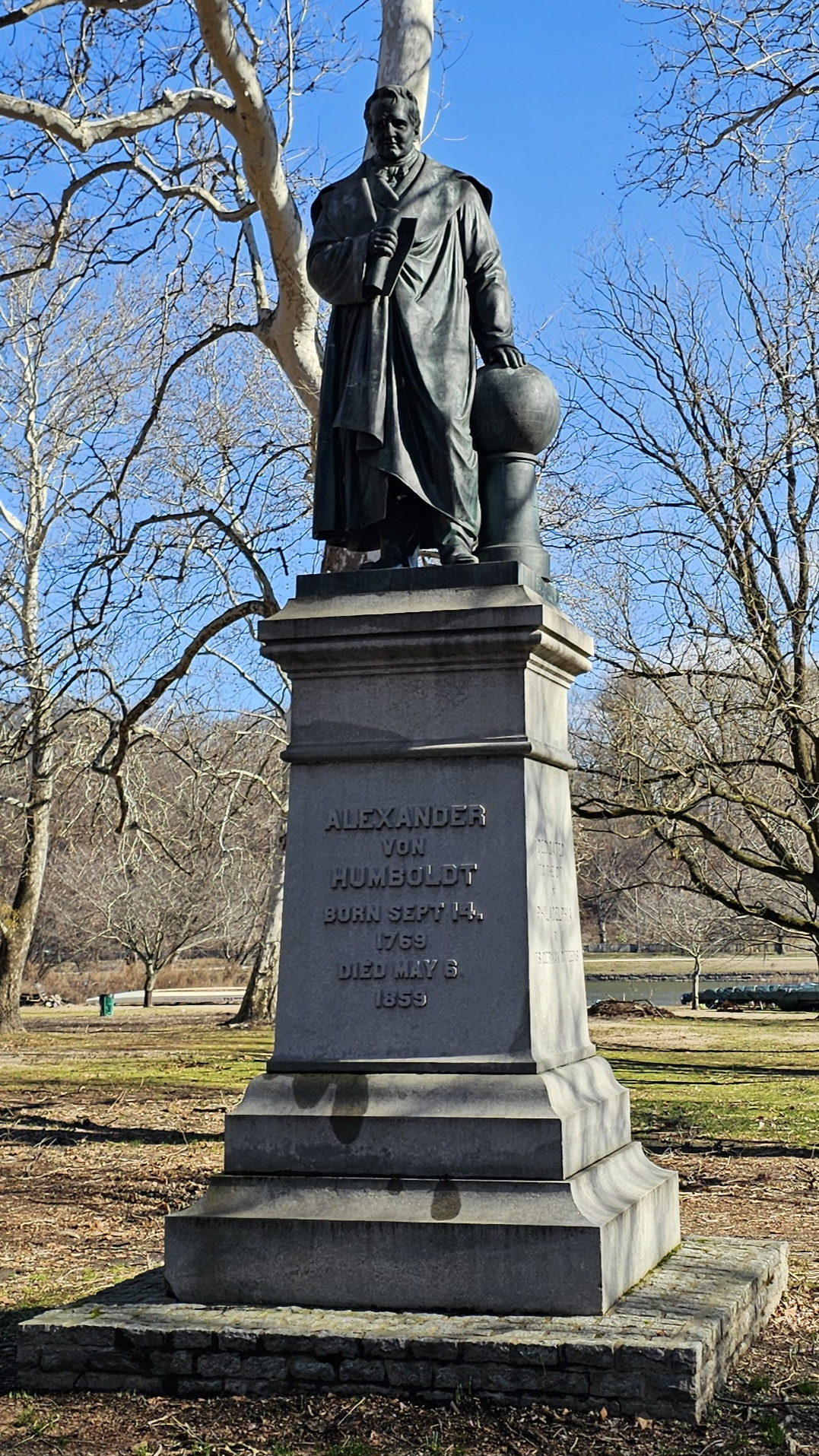
- The monument in 2024
- 39°58′56″N 75°12′21″W
- Location: Fairmount Park, Philadelphia, Pennsylvania, United States
- Designer: Friedrich Drake
- Material: Bronze; Granite (pedestal)
- Beginning date: September 13, 1869
- Completion date: 1871
- Dedicated date: 1876
- Dedicated to: Alexander von Humboldt

The Alexander von Humboldt statue is a monumental statue of Alexander von Humboldt in Philadelphia, Pennsylvania, United States. Located in Fairmount Park, the statue was completed in 1871 and donated to the city in 1876.

== History ==
Alexander von Humboldt was a Prussian polymath active during the late 18th and early 19th centuries. In May 1804, on the last stage of his scientific journey through the Americas, he visited Philadelphia. On September 13, 1869, on the centennial anniversary of Humboldt's birth, the cornerstone for a monument honoring him was laid in Fairmount Park, on a knoll overlooking the Girard Avenue Bridge, by the city's German society. The statue on Humboldt was designed by Friedrich Drake, a German sculptor based in Berlin. It was dedicated in 1871. Several years later, in 1876, on the centennial of American independence, the statue was gifted to the city of Philadelphia and dedicated again. According to the Association for Public Art, the statue was moved to another part of the park in 1977.

== Design ==
The monument consists of a bronze sculpture of Humboldt placed on a granite socle. Humboldt is wearing a long coat, with his left hand on a globe. In his right hand is a scroll with "COSMOS" written on it.

== See also ==
- 1871 in art

== Bibliography ==
- Philadelphia, a Guide to the Nation's Birthplace. Compiled by the Federal Writers' Project, sponsored by the Pennsylvania Historical Commission (1st ed.). The Telegraph Press. 1937. p. 549. ISBN 978-1-62376-058-8 – via Google Books.
- Andreas W. Daum, "Nation, Naturforschung und Monument: Humboldt-Denkmäler in Deutschland und den USA" [Humboldt monuments in Germany and the US]. Die Kunst der Geschichte: Historiographie, Ästhetik, Erzählung, ed. Martin Baumeister et al. Göttingen: Vandenhoeck & Ruprecht, 2009, 99‒124.
- Daum, Andreas W. (2024). Alexander von Humboldt: A Concise Biography. Princeton University Press. ISBN 978-0-691-24736-6.
- Pohlsander, Hans A. (2010). German Monuments in the Americas: Bonds Across the Atlantic. Peter Lang. ISBN 978-3-0343-0138-1 – via Google Books.
- Scharf, J. Thomas; Westcott, Thompson (1884). History of Philadelphia, 1609-1884. Vol. III. L. H. Everts & Company – via Google Books.
- Tatlock, Lynne; Erlin, Matt, eds. (2005). German Culture in Nineteenth-century America: Reception, Adaptation, Transformation. Camden House Publishing. ISBN 978-1-57113-308-3 – via Google Books.
