= Christian Philipp Wolff =

German sculptor and master builder

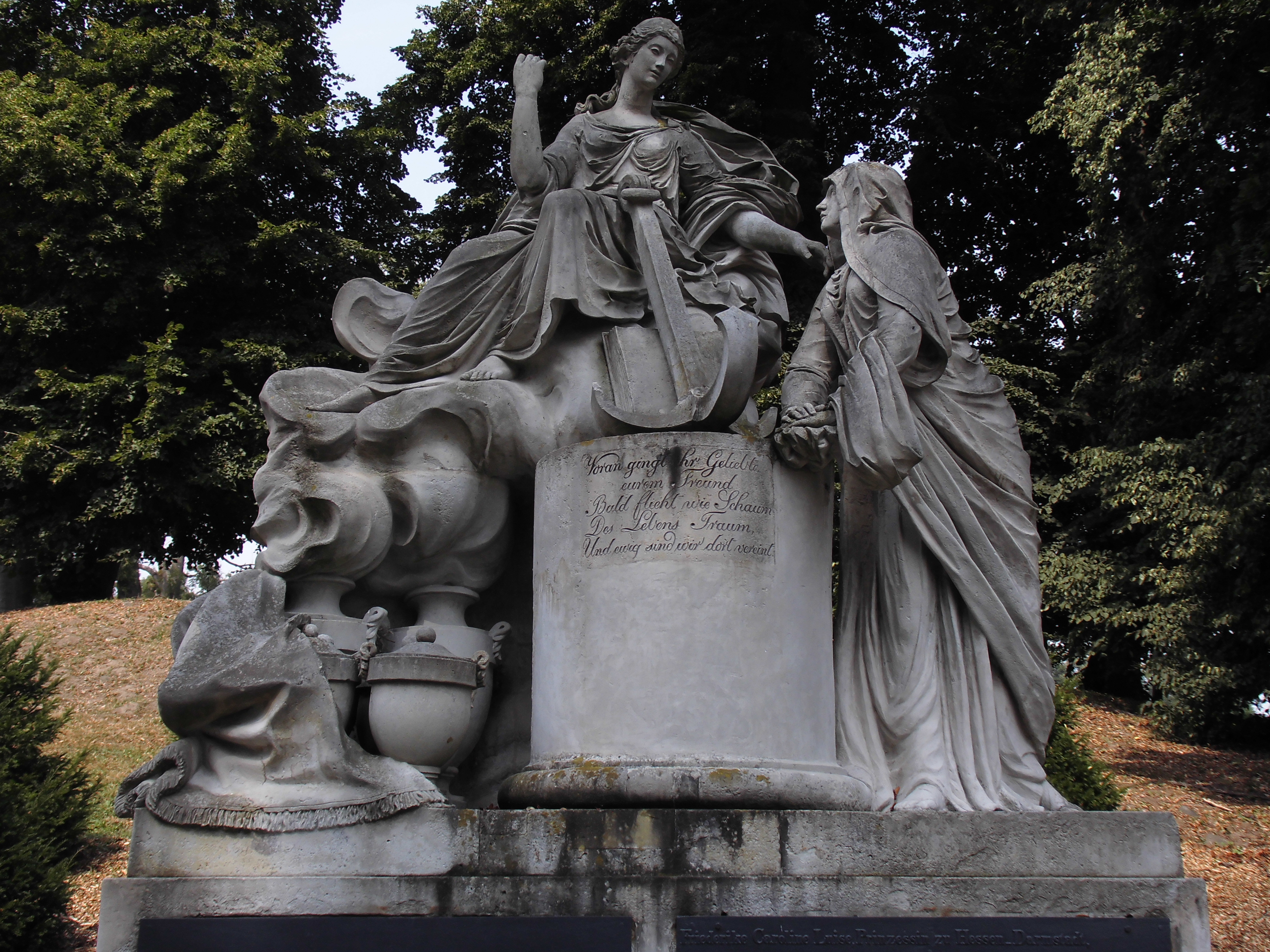
"Hope Comforts Grief", a monument to the wives and children of Charles II, Grand Duke of Mecklenburg-Strelitz

Christian Philipp Wolff (17 June 1772, Bad Arolsen - 27 August 1820, Berlin) was a German sculptor and master builder.

== Life and work ==
He was born to Johann Wilhelm Wolff (1725–1784), the valet and court tailor of Waldeck, and his wife Anna Elisabeth Christina, née Sude (died 1790), from Heringhausen.

He attended school in Bad Arolsen, then completed an apprenticeship with the court sculptor Friedrich Valentin.

After 1797, he worked as a sculptor in Neustrelitz, the royal capital of Mecklenburg-Strelitz. In 1809, he married Maria Christiane Wilhelmine Siemers, daughter of the Chief Forester. They had four children, one of whom, Albert, also became a sculptor.

In 1811, his death mask of Queen Louise was used by his friend, Christian Daniel Rauch, to create the Queen's grave monument.

At that time, his occupation was "construction manager". After 1816, he was a Master Builder; then the official Court Builder.

He was a Freemason and a co-founder of the St. Johannis Lodge, "Zum Friedensbunde" (peace alliance) in Neubrandenburg. He died while working in Berlin, and was succeeded as Court Builder by Friedrich Wilhelm Buttel.

In the 1820s, his designs were used to rebuild the Palais Neubrandenburg.

== Sources ==
- "Wolff, Christian Philipp". In: Hans Vollmer (Ed.): Allgemeines Lexikon der Bildenden Künstler von der Antike bis zur Gegenwart. Vol.36: Wilhelmy–Zyzywi. E. A. Seemann, Leipzig 1947, pg.193.
- Konrad Hustaedt: "Christian Philipp Wolff. Ein Mecklenburg-Strelitzer Hofbaumeister und Bildhauer". In: Mecklenburg-Strelitzer Heimatblätter. #7, 1931, Vol.4, pp.53–58.
- Sven-Hinrich Siemers: "Der Mecklenburg-Strelitzer Hofbaumeister Wolff. Ein vergessener Waldecker Bildhauer". In: Geschichtsblätter für Waldeck. Vol.97, 2009, pp.102–111.
