= Hermann Schievelbein =

German sculptor (1817–1867)

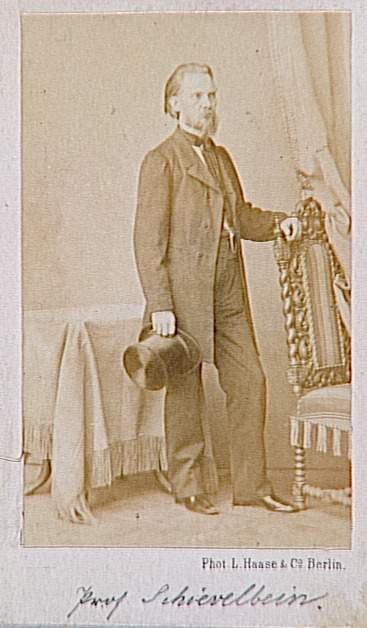
- Hermann Schievelbein (date unknown)
- Born: 18 November 1817; Berlin, Prussia
- Died: 6 May 1867 (aged 49); Berlin, Prussia

Friedrich Anton Hermann Schievelbein (18 November 1817 – 6 May 1867) was a German sculptor.

== Life ==
He was the son of a master carpenter and lost his parents early, growing up in the home of an older sister. His artistic education began with the landscape painter Carl Friedrich Trautmann (1804-1875). Afterwards, he attended the Prussian Academy of Art from 1835 to 1838, where he studied with the sculptor Ludwig Wilhelm Wichmann. After graduating, he spent three years in Saint Petersburg, helping to decorate Saint Isaac's Cathedral and the Winter Palace.

Two years later, he received the "Großen Staatspreis" for a figure of Merope about to kill her son Aepytus. The prize included a stipend that enabled him to travel in Italy. He broke off the trip in 1844 and returned early, having received a commission for a figure on the Schloßbrücke (Castle Bridge) in Berlin-Mitte. In 1860, he was appointed a professor at the academy, and became a member of its governing senate in 1866. In addition to his large-scale works, he also created sculptural decorations at the terracotta factory of Ernst March.

A persistent chest ailment forced him to take frequent curative trips to the south. He died of pleurisy, aged only fifty.

== Selected major works ==
- 1845-1847: Zinc statues of four of the Apostles on the Helsinki Cathedral
- 1850/1851: Terra cotta reliefs Auszug der Krieger (Retreat of the Warrior) and Heimkehr des siegreichen Heeres (Return of the Victorious Army) on the base of the Triumphal Arch, Potsdam
- 1853: Statue Athene unterrichtet den Jungen im Gebrauch der Waffen (Athena Instructing a Young Warrior), on the Schloßbrücke.
- 1863/1864: Models for allegorical figures representing six of the months, on the West and East wings of the Orangery Palace in Potsdam. The full statues were executed from 1865 to 1866 by Wilhelm Stürmer and Eduard Stützel.
- 1867−1869: Monument for Heinrich Friedrich Karl vom und zum Stein, formerly on the Dönhoffplatz on the Leipziger Straße, now in front of the Abgeordnetenhaus (House of Representatives) in Berlin.

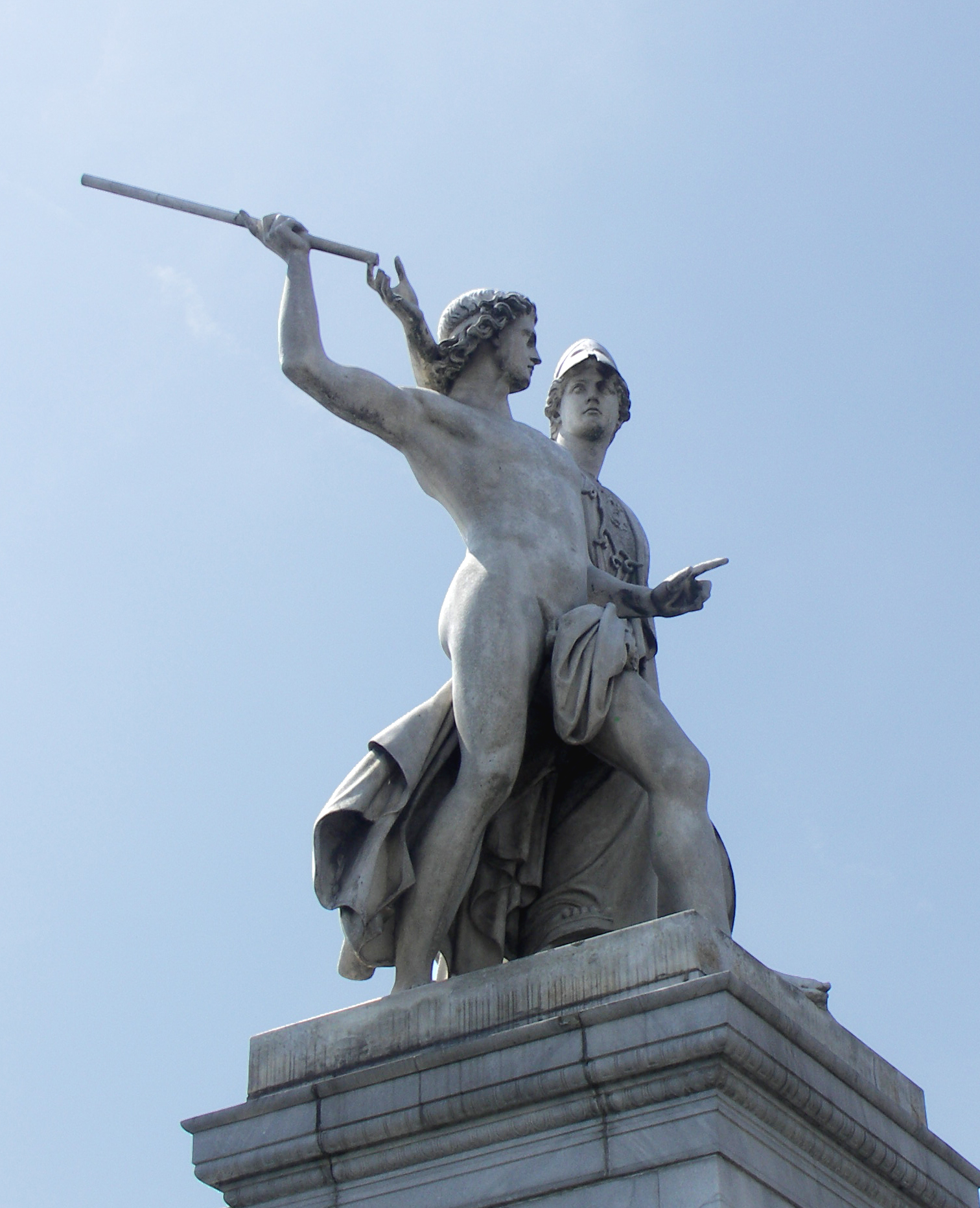
"Athena/Jungen", on the Schloßbrücke

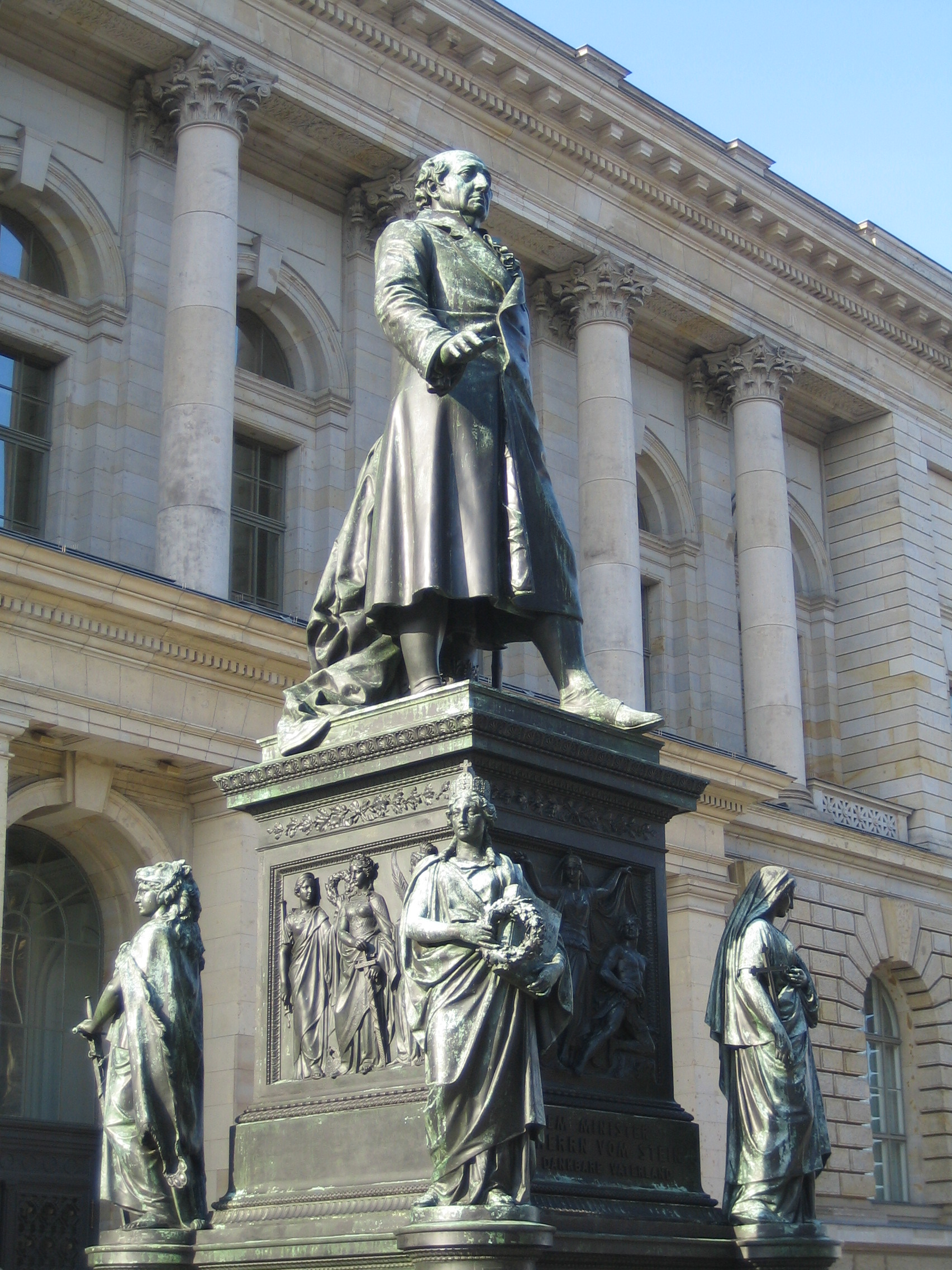
Monument to
Freiherr vom Stein

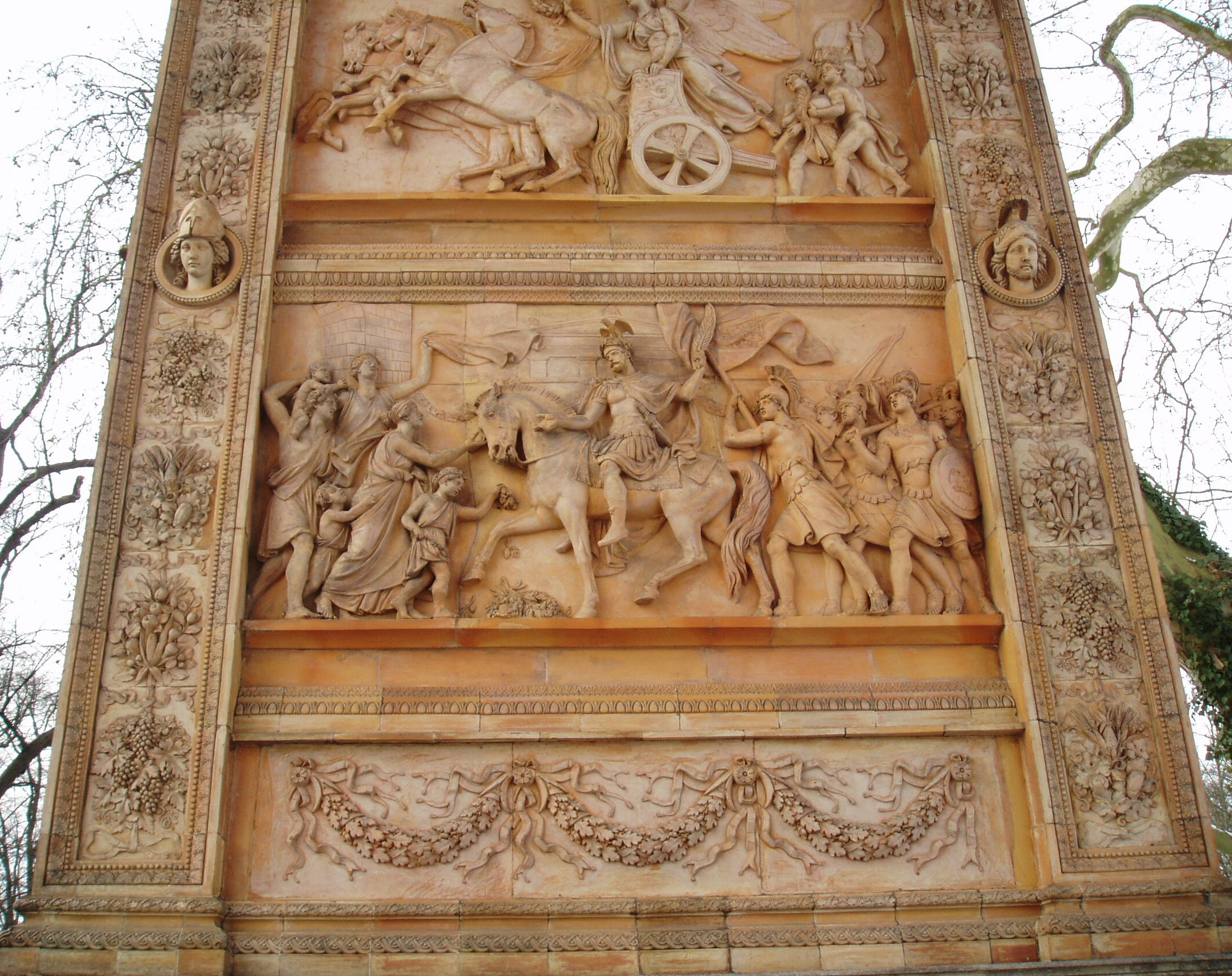
Reliefs on the Triumphal Arch

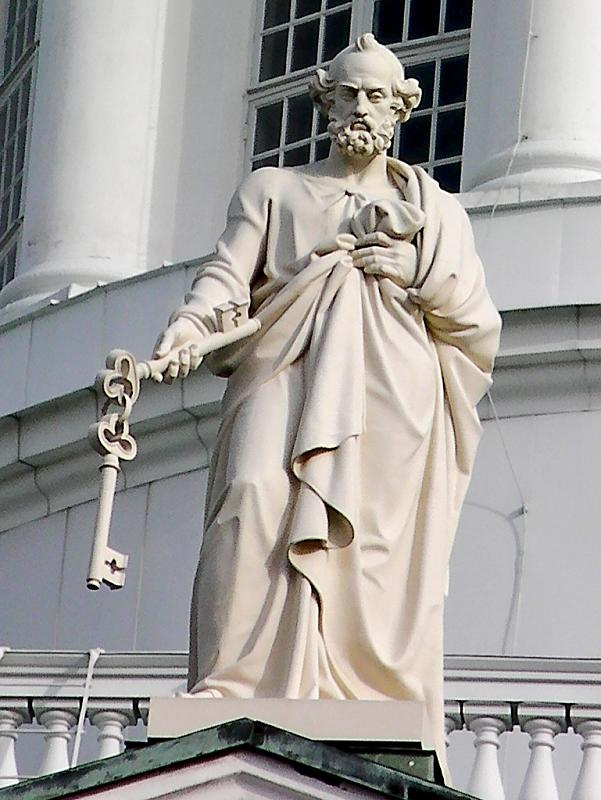
Saint Peter at the Helsinki Cathedral
