= Schlossbrücke =

Bridge located in Germany

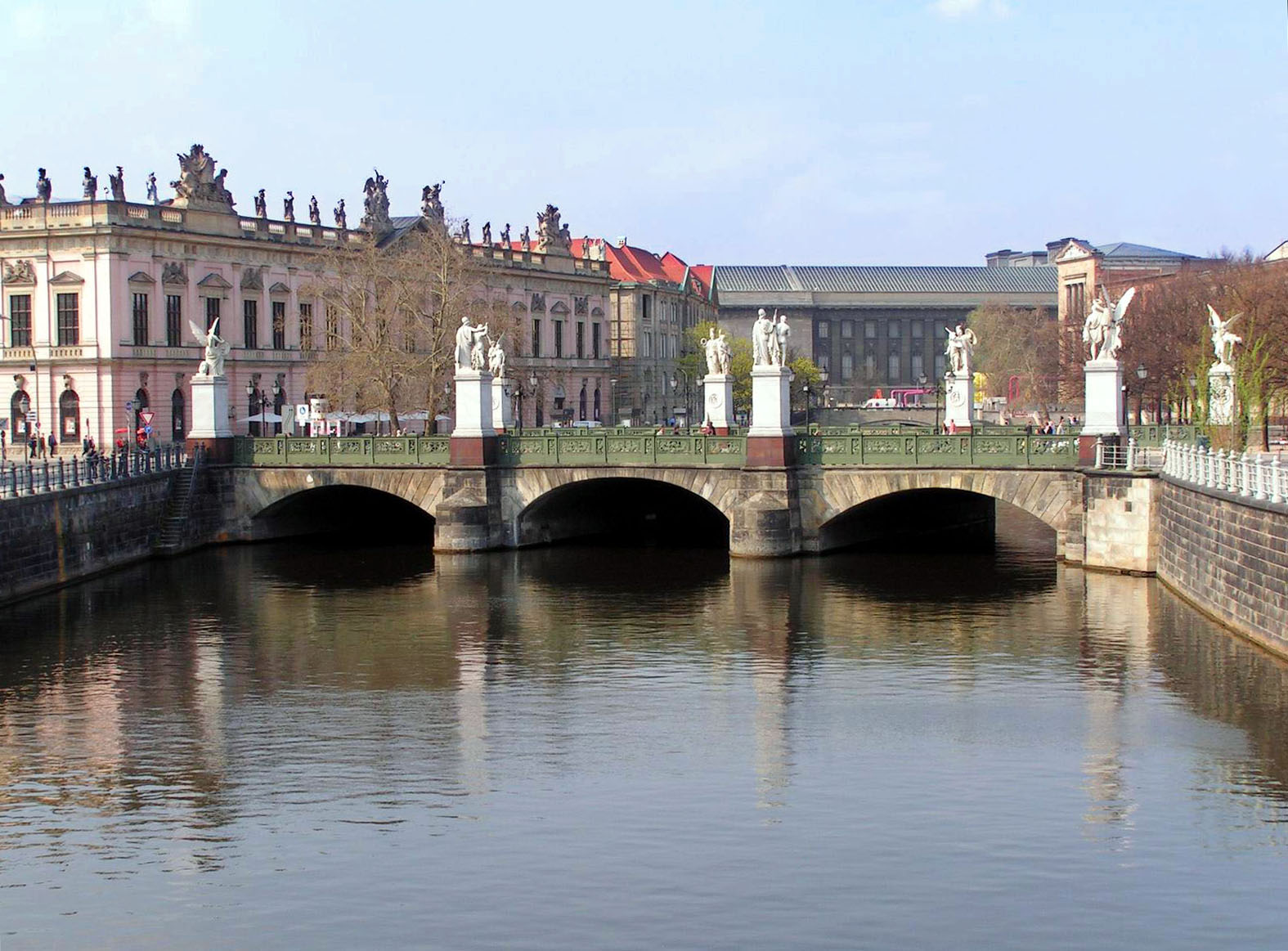
- Schlossbrücke
- Coordinates: 52°31′03″N 13°23′55″E
- Carries: Unter den Linden
- Locale: (Mitte) Berlin
- Named for: City Palace

Characteristics
- Material: Sandstone

History
- Designer: Karl Friedrich Schinkel
- Construction start: 1821
- Inaugurated: 1824

Location
- Interactive map of Schlossbrücke

Schlossbrücke (German: Schloßbrücke) is a bridge in the central Mitte district of Berlin, Germany. Built between 1821 and 1824 according to plans designed by Karl Friedrich Schinkel, it was named after the nearby City Palace (Stadtschloss). The bridge marks the eastern end of the Unter den Linden boulevard.

The monumental figures on the three-arched bridge were created to commemorate the Wars of Liberation. They depict warriors and goddesses of victory and reference the statues of generals and reliefs of Victory at the Neue Wache. After the Second World War, the damaged bridge was restored, and the removed figures were reinstalled in 1983–1984.

== History ==
A bridge at the site, leading across the Spree canal, already existed in the 15th century, when Berlin emerged as the residence of the Brandenburg margraves. The Hohenzollern rulers passed it, when they left their Stadtschloss residence for hunting in the Tiergarten grounds. Then called Hundebrücke, after the accompanying packs of dogs, the pile bridge was rebuilt in 1738 and later served Napoleon's troops as a direct route into the city centre.

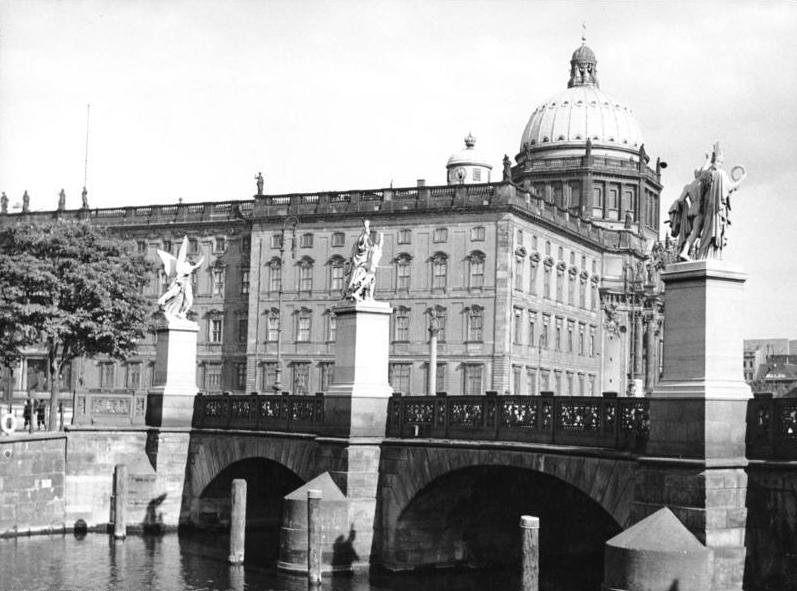
Schlossbrücke and City Palace, about 1900

In the early 19th century, the wooden bridge was considered inadequate by King Frederick William III of Prussia, who ordered a new prestigious construction and commissioned his court architect Karl Friedrich Schinkel. First studies and drafts date from 1819; construction started two years later, then part of a general project to refurbish the whole area on Unter den Linden between Spree and present-day Bebelplatz. From the new arch bridge built of sandstone, the broad Unter den Linden boulevard ran in a direct line to the western city limits at Brandenburg Gate. Schinkel also had the adjacent Lustgarten premises in the east restored and designed the nearby Neue Wache to commemorate the veterans of the Napoleonic Wars. On 29 November 1823, during the marriage of Crown Prince Frederick William IV with Princess Elisabeth Ludovika of Bavaria, large crowds thronged across the yet uncompleted construction and 22 people drowned falling into the river. The bridge was opened to the traffic in Summer 1824.

Again enlarged in 1912 and equipped with a reinforced concrete structure in the 1920s, the bridge suffered only minor damage in World War II. In 1951 the East German authorities renamed it Marx-Engels-Brücke, along with the adjacent Marx-Engels-Platz (present-day Schloßplatz). Its original name was restored on 3 October 1991, one year after German reunification.

== Statues ==
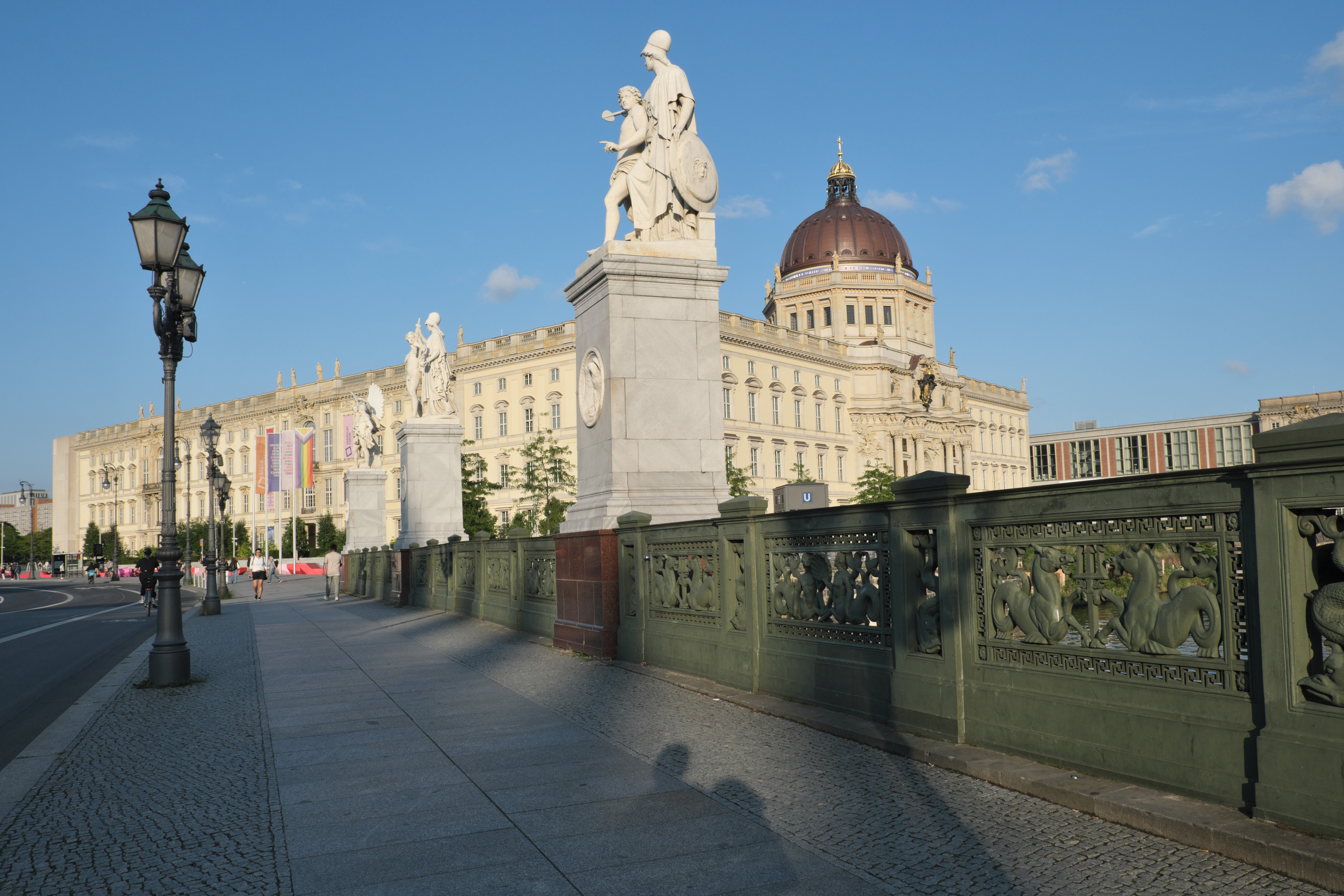
View from the Schlossbrücke to the City Palace in 2025

Statues erected on the bridge include:

- Athena Arms the Warrior (1851)
- Athena Leads the Young Warrior into the Fight (1853)
- Athena Protects the Young Hero (1854)
- Athena Teaches the Young Man How to Use a Weapon (1853)
- Iris Takes the Fallen Hero to Olympus (1857)
- Nike Assists the Wounded Warrior (1853)
- Nike Crowns the Hero (1853)
- Nike Instructs the Boy in Heroic History

Statues on south side of the bridge from west to east

- Nike Instructs the Boy in Heroic History by Emil Wolff, 1847
- Athena Teaches the Young Man How to Use a Weapon by Hermann Schievelbein, 1853
- Athena Arms the Warrior by Karl Heinrich Möller, 1851
- Nike Crowns the Hero by Friedrich Drake, 1853
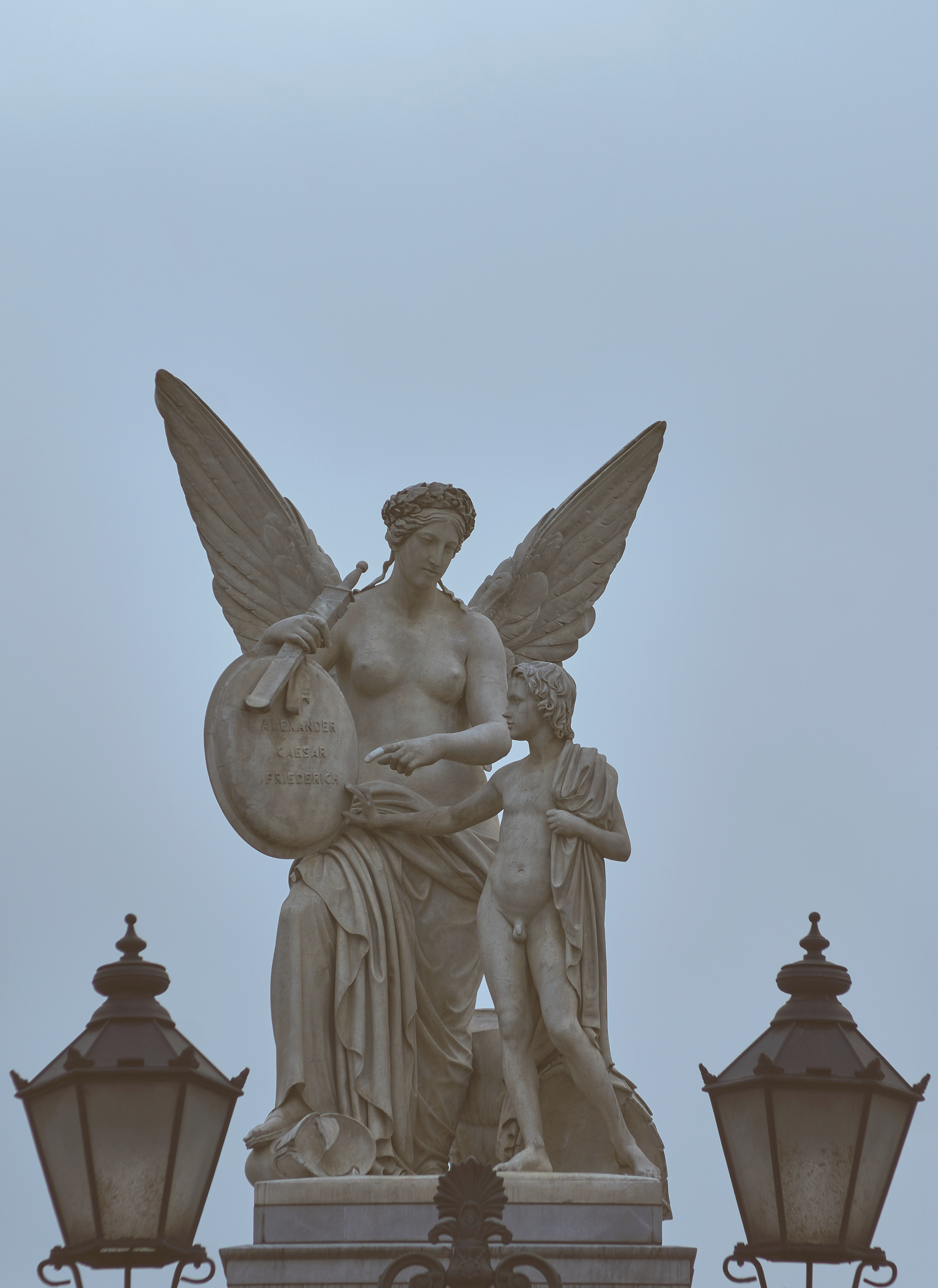
Nike Instructs the Boy in Heroic History

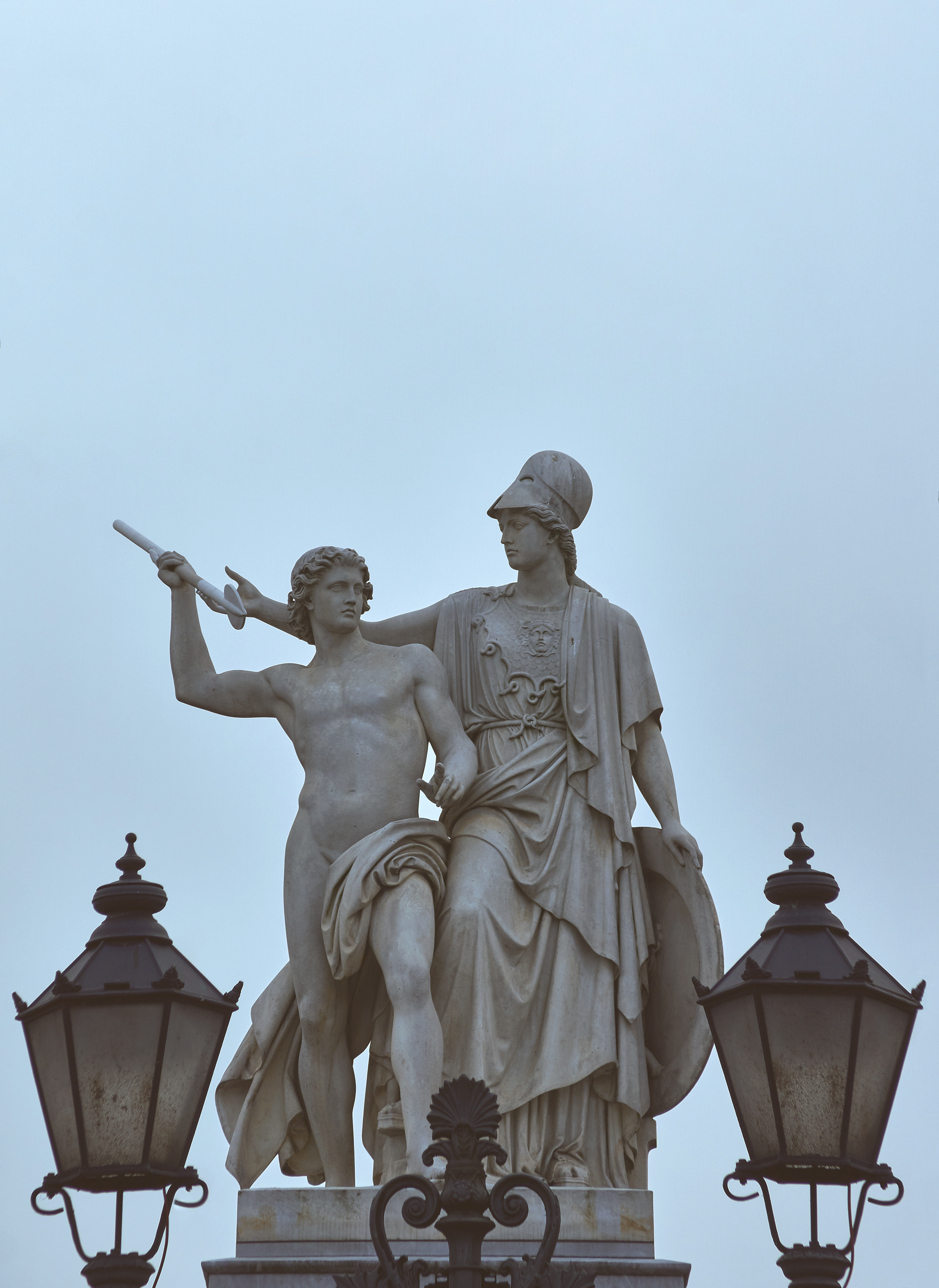
Athena Teaches the Young Man How to Use a Weapon

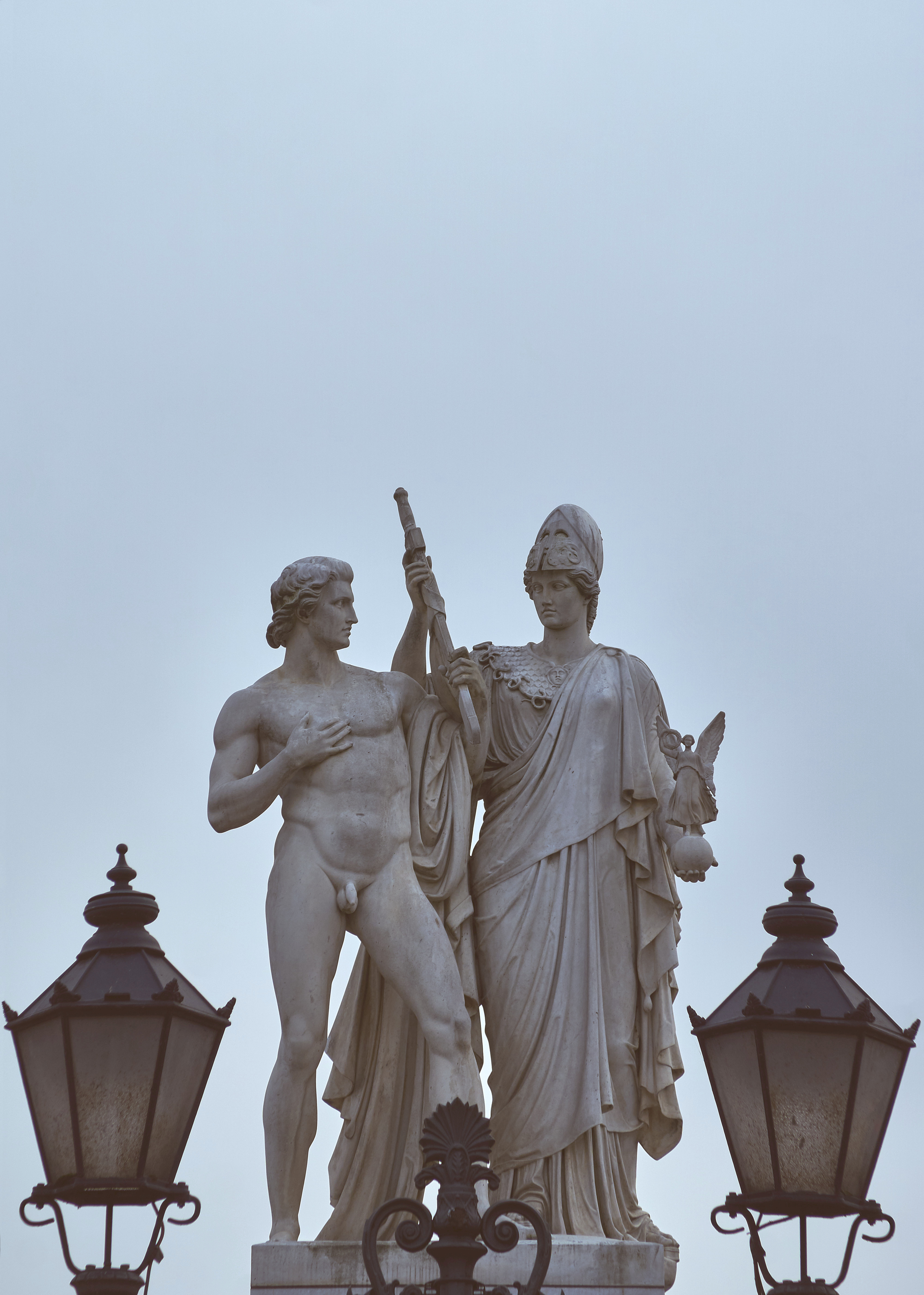
Athena Arms the Warrior

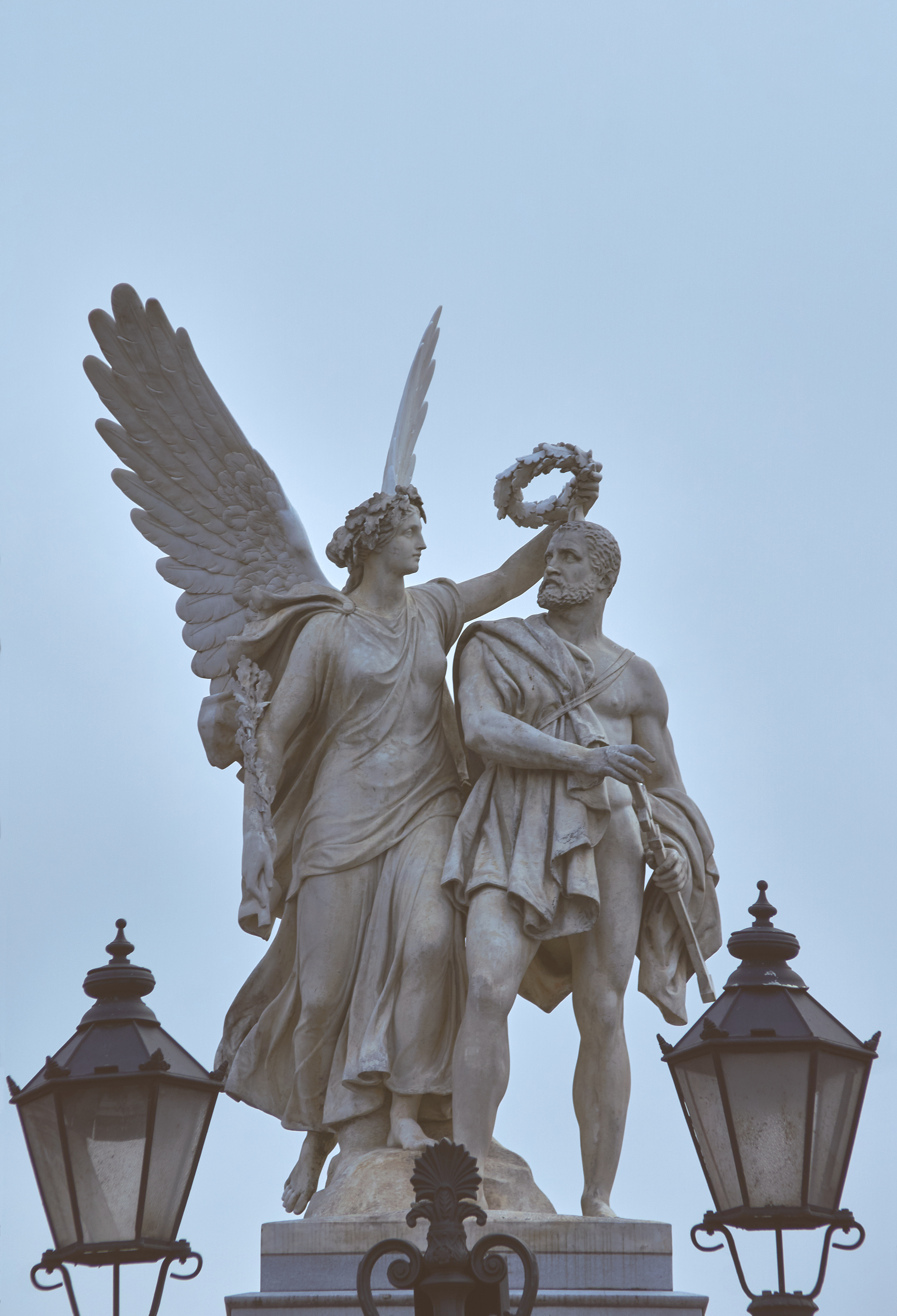
Nike Crowns the Hero

Statues on north side from west to east

- Nike Assists the Wounded Warrior by Ludwig Wilhelm Wichmann, 1853
- Athena Leads the Young Warrior into the Fight by Albert Wolff, 1853
- Athena Protects the Young Hero by Gustav Blaeser, 1854
- Iris Takes the Fallen Hero to Olympus by August Wredow, 1857
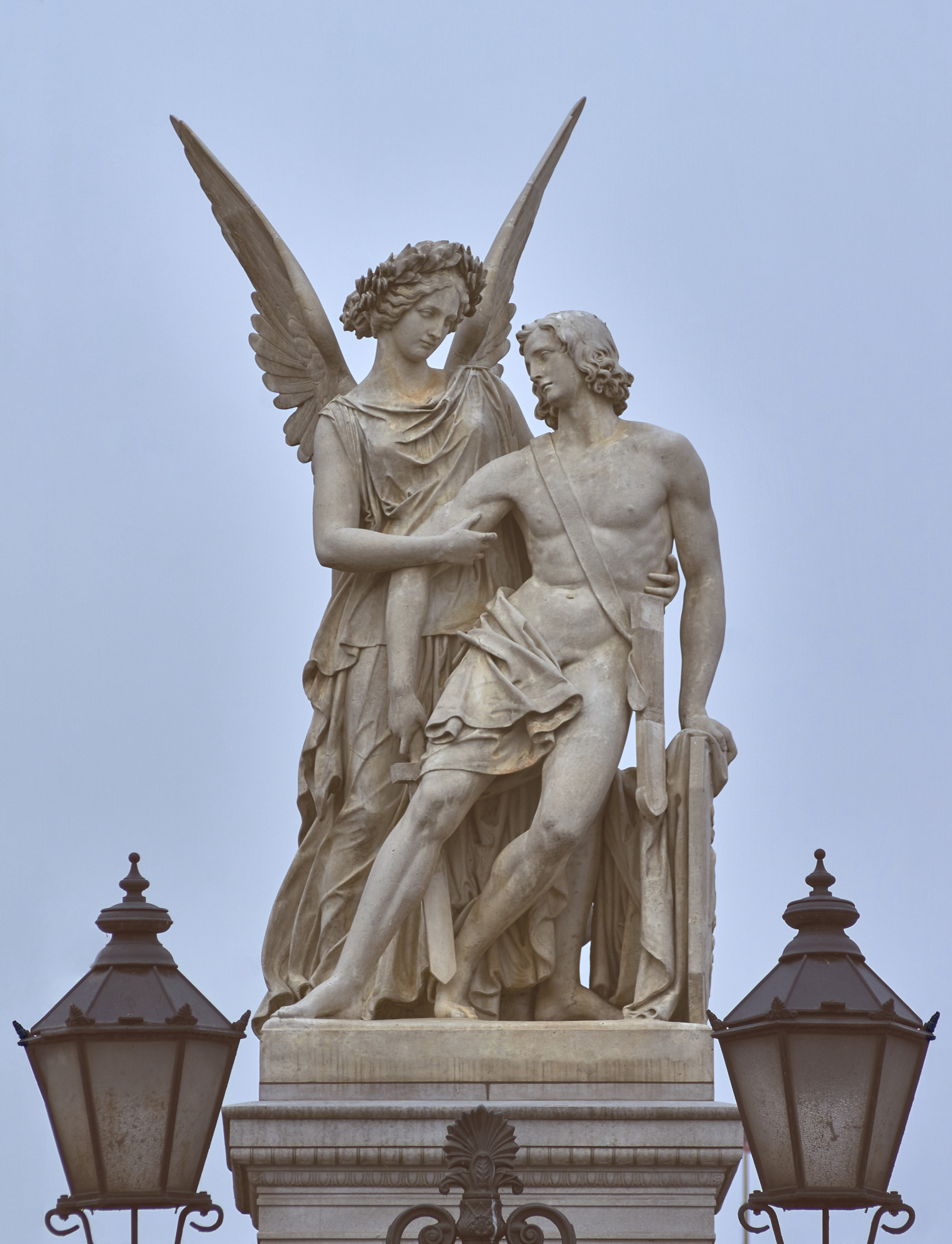
Nike Assists the Wounded Warrior

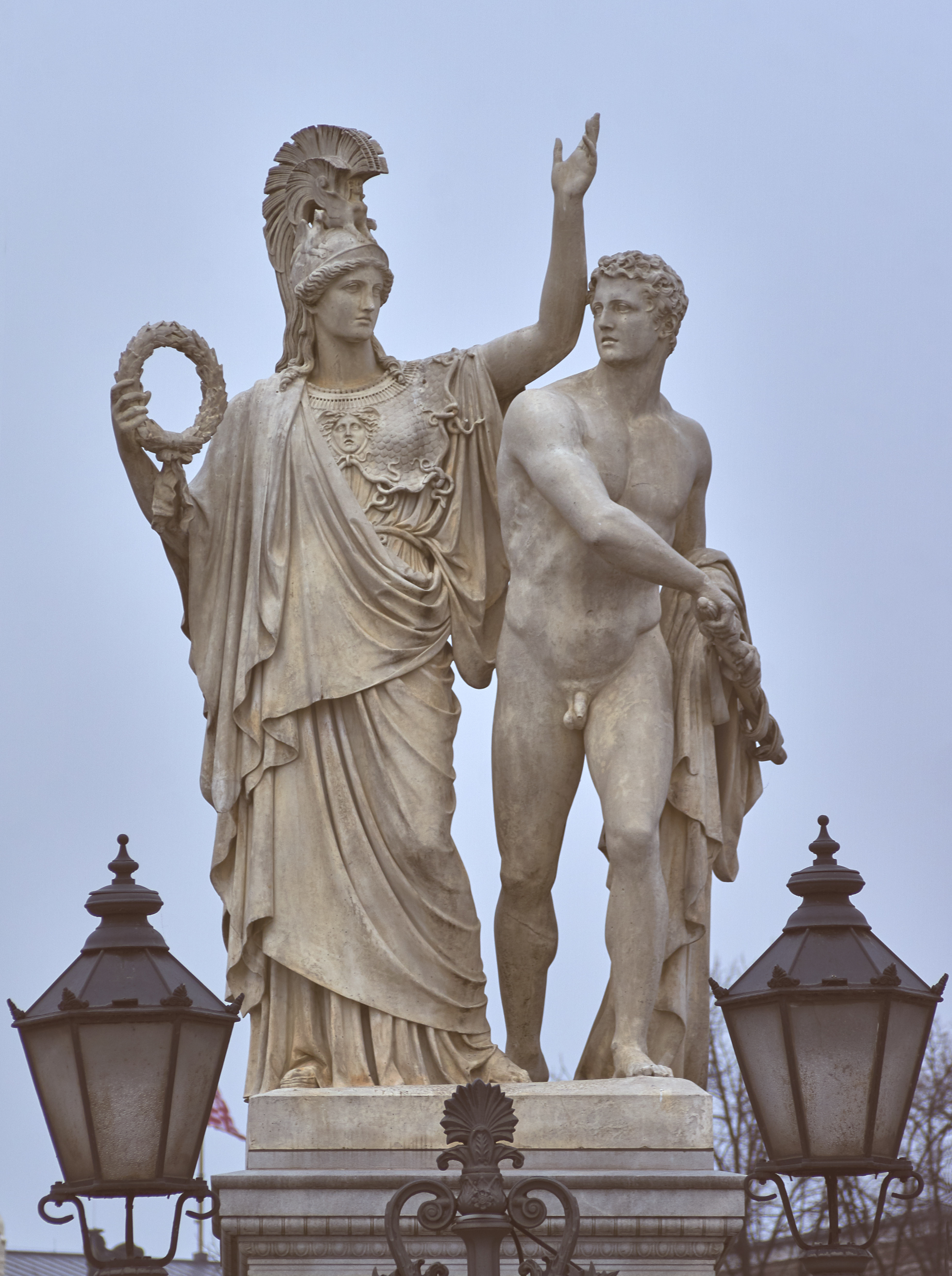
Athena Leads the Young Warrior into the Fight

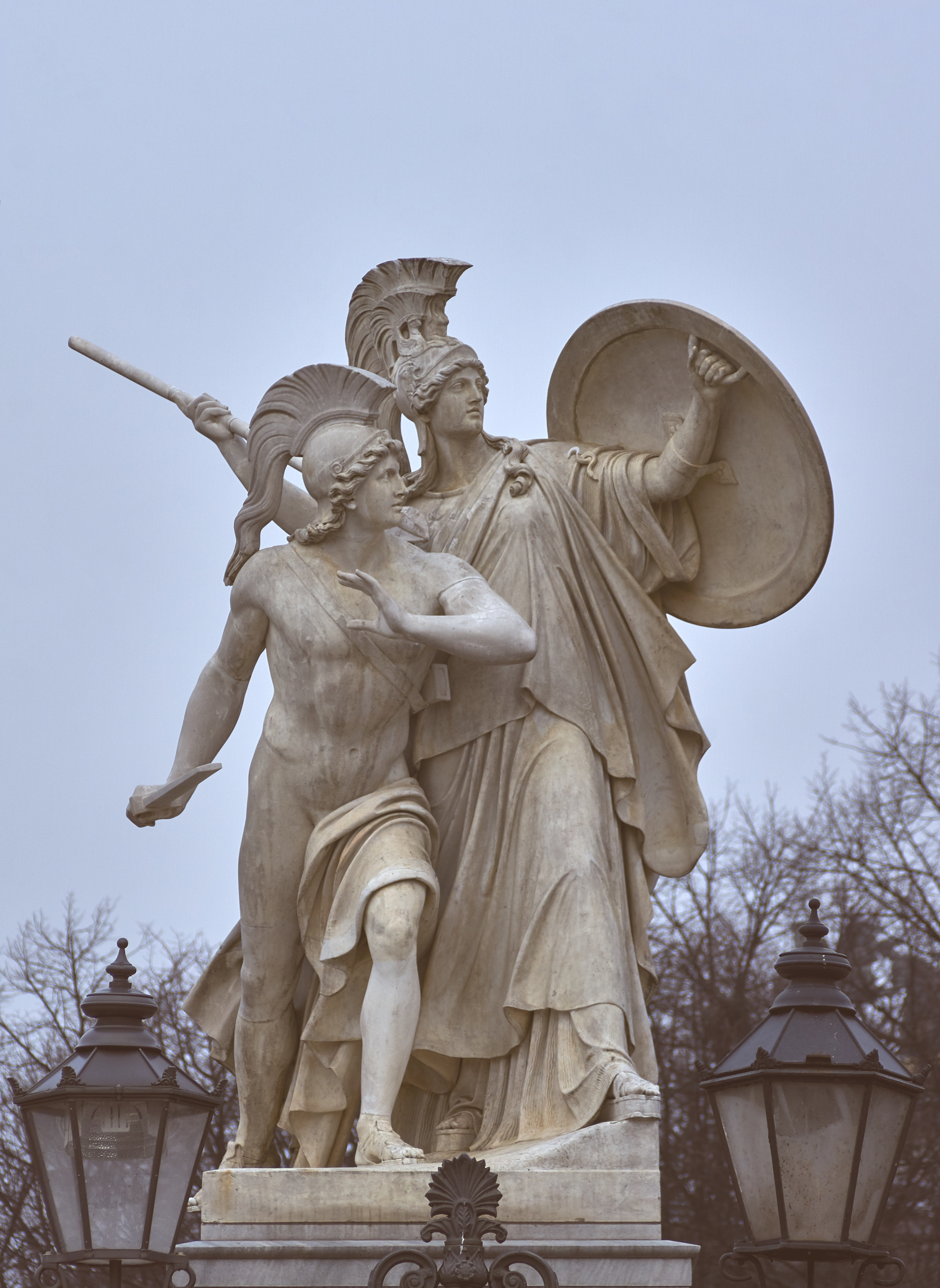
Athena Protects the Young Hero

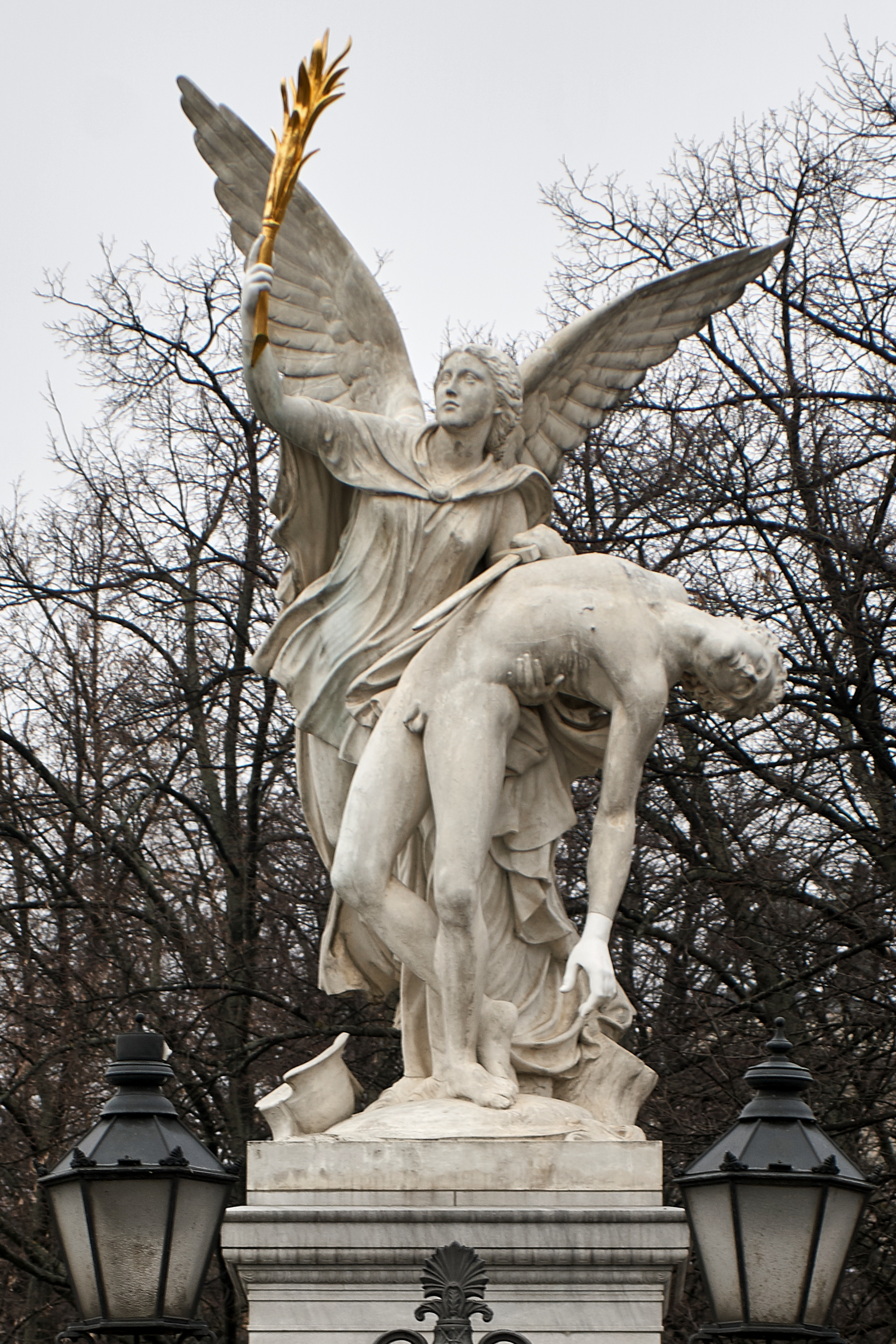
Iris Takes the Fallen Hero to Olympus
