= Nike Crowns the Hero =

Sculpture in Berlin, Germany

- Nike krönt den Sieger (German)
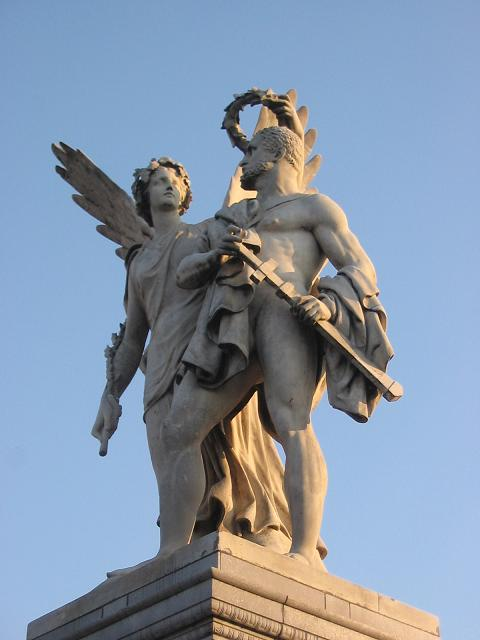
- The sculpture in 2006
- Artist: Friedrich Drake
- Year: 1853
- Type: Sculpture
- Location: Berlin, Germany

Nike Crowns the Hero (German: Nike krönt den Sieger) is an outdoor 1853 sculpture by Friedrich Drake, installed on Schlossbrücke in Berlin, Germany.
