= Athena Teaches the Young Man How to Use a Weapon =

Sculpture in Berlin, Germany

- Athena unterrichtet den Jungen im Waffengebrauch (German)
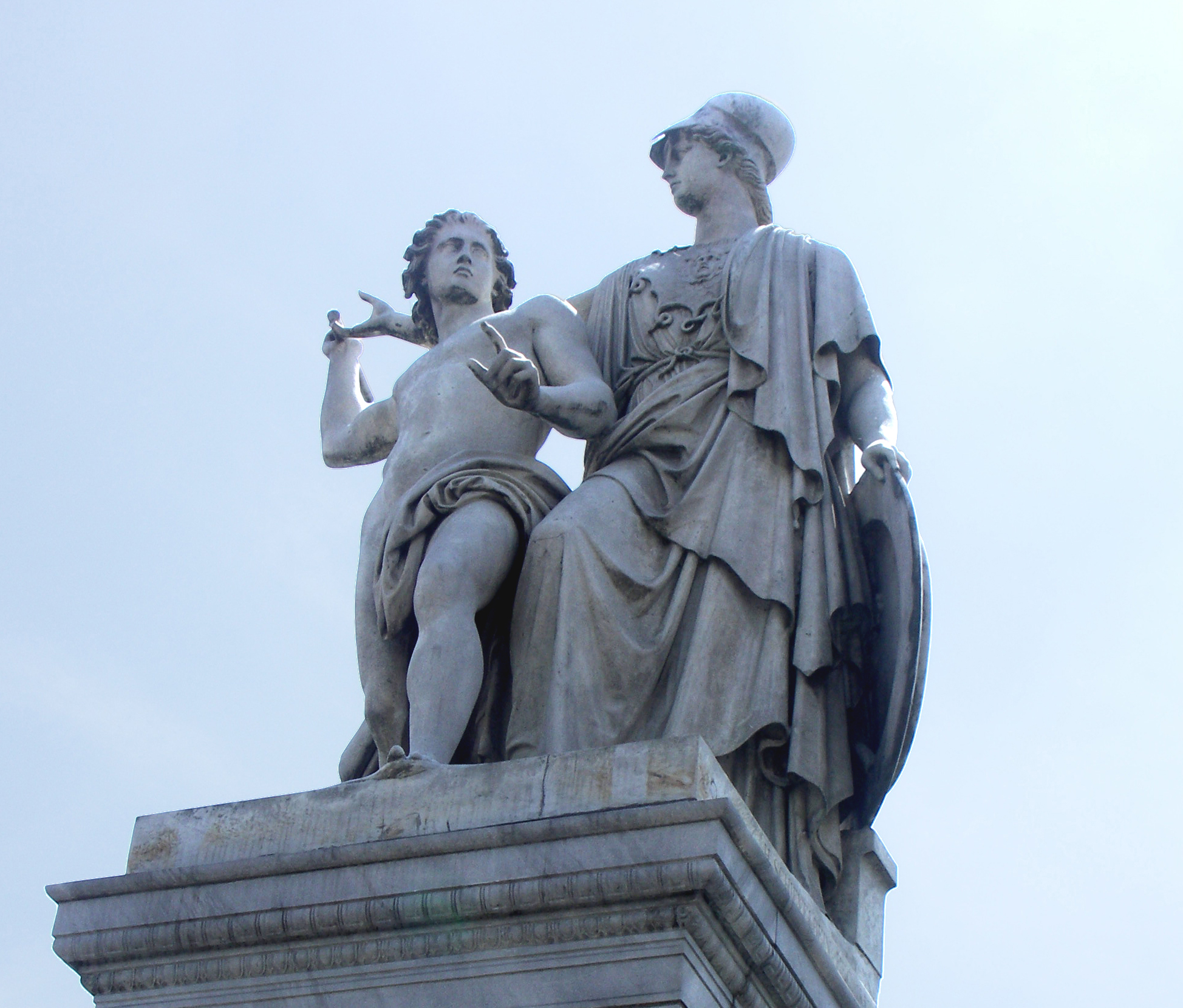
- The sculpture in 2007
- Artist: Hermann Schievelbein
- Year: 1853
- Type: Sculpture
- Location: Berlin, Germany; 52°31′03″N 13°23′54″E

Athena Teaches the Young Man How to Use a Weapon (German: Athena unterrichtet den Jungen im Waffengebrauch) is an 1853 sculpture by Hermann Schievelbein, installed on Schlossbrücke in Berlin, Germany.

== See also ==
- 1853 in art
- Greek mythology in popular culture
