= Athena Arms the Warrior =

Sculpture in Berlin, Germany

- Athena bewaffnet den Krieger (German)
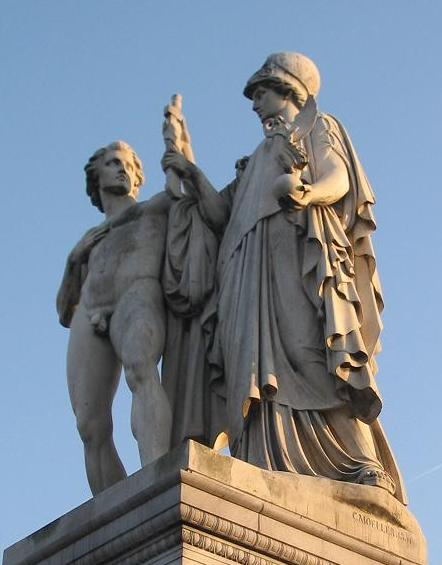
- The sculpture in 2006
- Artist: Karl Heinrich Möller
- Year: 1851
- Type: Sculpture
- Location: Berlin, Germany; 52°31′03″N 13°23′55″E

Athena Arms the Warrior (German: Athena bewaffnet den Krieger) is an 1851 sculpture by Karl Heinrich Möller, installed on Schlossbrücke (Palace Bridge) in Berlin, Germany. It depicts the goddess Athena bestowing arms upon a warrior. The sculpture is one of eight allegorical statues adorning Berlin's Schlossbrücke (Palace Bridge), each depicting mythological scenes that celebrate heroism and virtue.

== See also ==
- 1851 in art
- Greek mythology in popular culture
