= Justus Möser =

German jurist and social theorist (1720–1794)

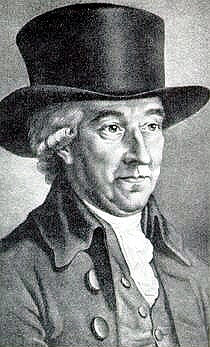
Justus Möser

Justus Möser (14 December 1720 – 8 January 1794) was a German jurist, social theorist, and conservative commentator best known for his innovative history of Osnabrück which stressed social and cultural themes. Möser is generally seen as the founder of German Conservatism.

== Biography ==
Möser was born in Osnabrück. Having studied law at the universities of Jena and Göttingen, he settled in his native town as a lawyer and was soon appointed advocatus patriae (state attorney) by his fellow citizens. From 1762 to 1768 he was justiciarius (chief justice) of the criminal court in Osnabrück, and in 1768 was made Geheimer Referendar (privy councillor of justice). For 20 years, he was the legal adviser of the lay Protestant bishop of Osnabrück, Prince Frederick, Duke of York and Albany, a son of George III of the United Kingdom and of his Queen consort Charlotte of Mecklenburg-Strelitz.

In addition to being a statesman and administrator, Möser was also a publicist, historian, and social analyst. His history of Osnabrück (1768; 2nd edition 1780; 3rd edition 1819) was and remains highly regarded. In his Patriotische Phantasien (1775-1786; 2nd edition by his daughter, IWJ von Voigts, 1804; new ed. by Reinhard Zöllner, 1871) he pleaded for a natural, organic development of the state in place of arbitrary laws imposed by the sovereign. He died in his home city of Osnabrück.

== Legacy ==
In his review of Justus Möser's economic views, Jerry Muller (1990) stated that Moser was a "precursor of modern conservatism" and that his views on 18th Century capitalism would offend many a 21st Century conservative. Muller (1990) points out that "for Moser the expansion of the market was primarily a threat". According to Möser the market "in tandem" with "cameralism and capitalism threatened to erode the existing... institutions which he so valued." Muller (1990) added more on this point: "New forms of capitalist economic organization... have led to the disappearance of the link between ownership of property and civic responsibility." Möser lamented that "Men are so involved in acquisition... that they no longer have time for political concerns and public life."

Thus Muller (2002) argues that Möser's views on the economic and political aspects of society contrast sharply with those of his much more renowned contemporary Adam Smith. Möser anticipate some of the ideas of the German Historical School and the social market economy. Möser can be seen as the German counterpart to Edmund Burke. Knudsen (1986) sees him as a man of the Age of Enlightenment who sought to understand the world around him.

== Möser's Vermischte Schriften (1797–1798) ==
Möser's Vermischte Schriften (1797–1798) published by Christoph Friedrich Nicolai with a biography balances its insights into human nature with humour and witty sallies. He was also a poet of some repute, and in 1749 published a tragedy, Arminius. Möser also wrote short stories, at least one of which was published in English, a witty letter from a lady to her Chaplain, on the terrors of idleness. A statue of him by Drake was unveiled in Osnabrück in 1836.

== Sämtliche Werke ==
Möser's collected works in 10 volumes, Sämtliche Werke, were published by B.R. Abeken, 1842–1844. His daughter, Jenny Voigts edited and published Justus's letters.They are online in German at the Internet Archive. Goethe was interested in his writings and included information about him in his own autobiography.
