= Iris Takes the Fallen Hero to Olympus =

Sculpture in Berlin, Germany

- Iris trägt den gefallenen Helden zum Olymp empor (German)
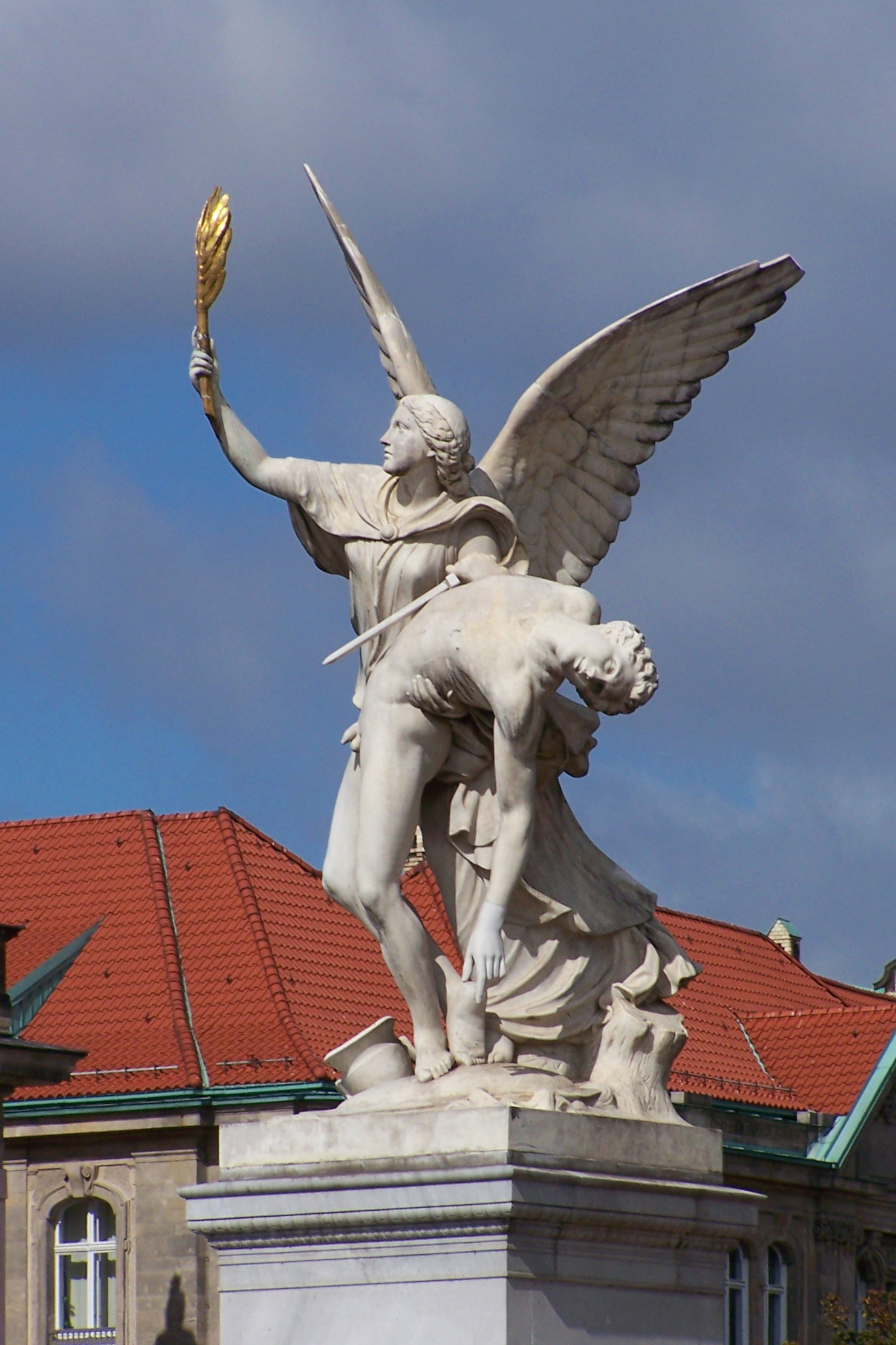
- The sculpture in 2007
- Artist: August Wredow
- Year: 1857
- Type: Sculpture
- Location: Berlin, Germany

Iris Takes the Fallen Hero to Olympus (German: Iris trägt den gefallenen Helden zum Olymp empor), or sometimes Nike Takes the Fallen Hero to Olympus (German: Nike trägt den gefallenen Helden zum Olymp empor) is an 1857 sculpture by August Wredow, installed on Schlossbrücke in Berlin, Germany.

== See also ==
- 1857 in art
