= Athenebrunnen =

Fountain in Stuttgart, Germany

Coordinates: 48°46′06″N 9°09′53″E

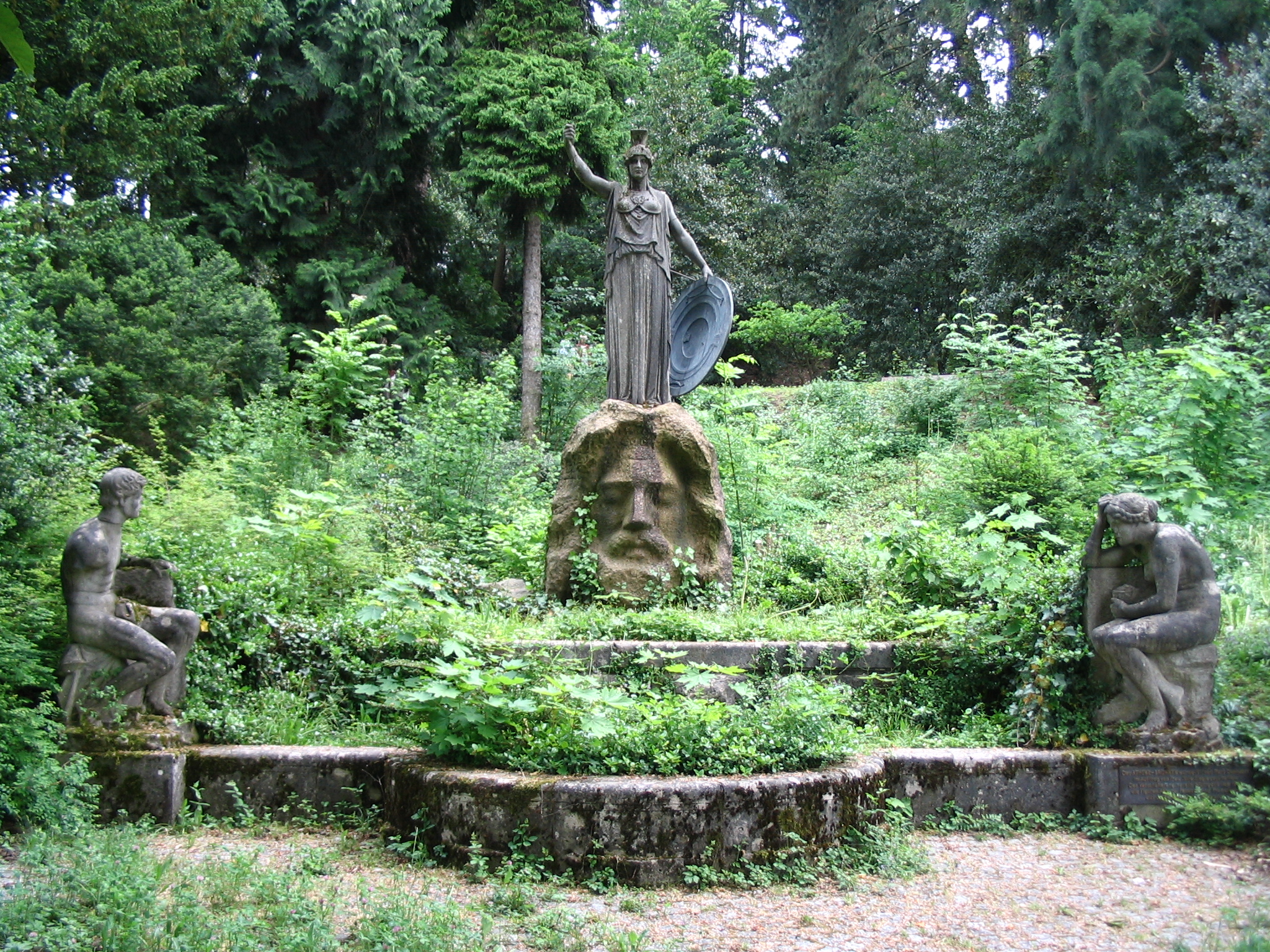

The Athenebrunnen (or Fountain of Pallas Athena) is a fountain that bears the name of the Greek goddess Athena and is along Jean-Amery-Weg towards Karlsruhe in the western part of Stuttgart. (Note: Karlshöhe is also the name of the area south of the Höhe in the southern part of Stuttgart.) It is a creation of Karl Donndorf (1870–1941), dating from 1911. This fountain, important both culturally and historically, has been fully operational since 2011.

== Story ==
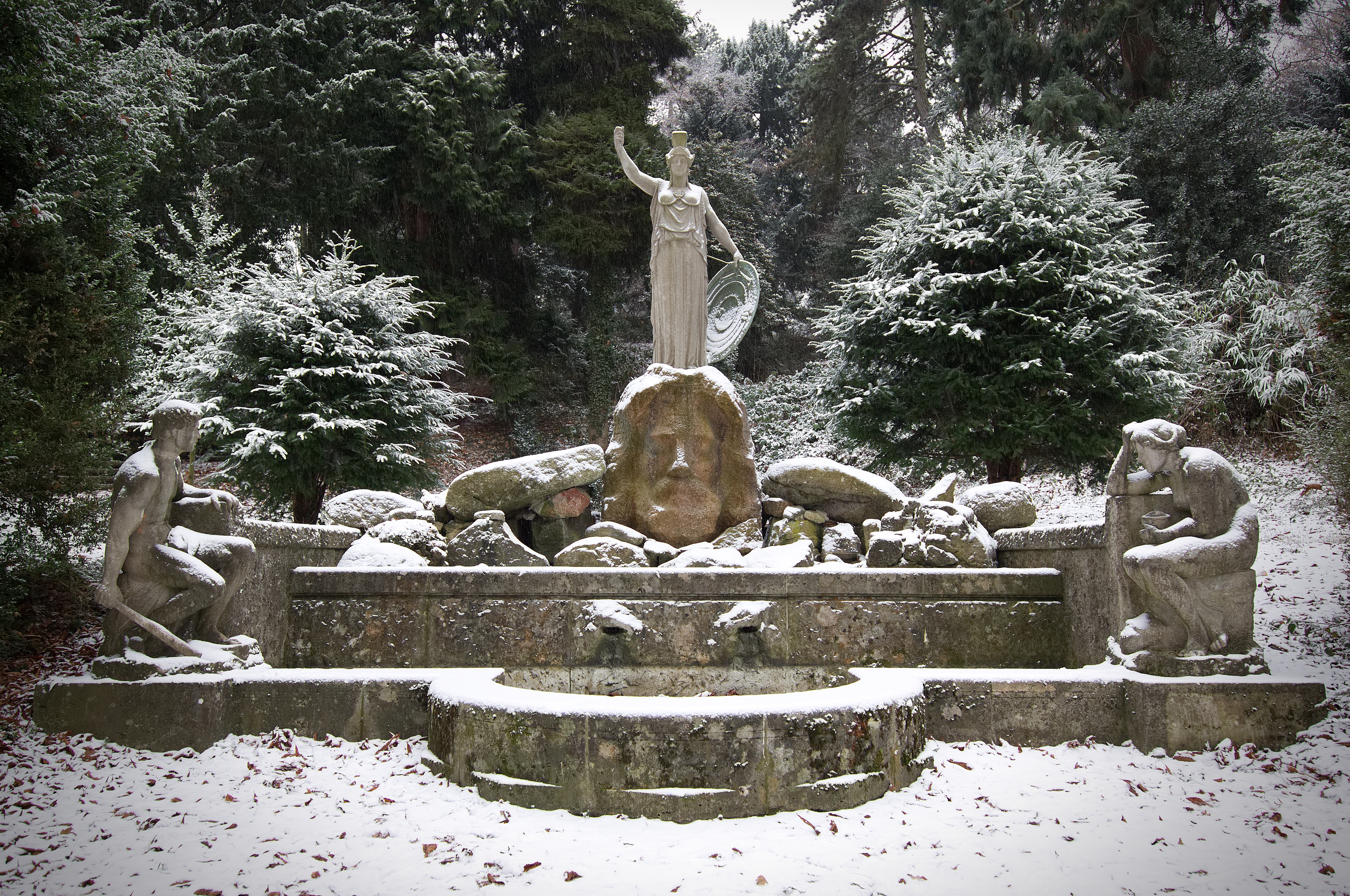
Athenebrunnen in winter

The fountain belonged to the park of the villa built in 1870 by the industrialist Gustav Siegle (1840–1905). His widow Julie had the fountain built by sculptor Karl Donndorf on the northern slope of Karlshöhe in a neoclassical style. It was located in the park above the Villa Siegle which is at the foot of Karlshöhe, and below the family's summer house "Sonnenschlösschen", which was at the top.

During the Second World War, the whole park suffered much damage. The villa had been destroyed in 1944 and the ruins demolished in 1953. The summer house was also demolished in 1961 and replaced by a viewing terrace with a bar which still exists today. Athena's fountain had also fallen into disrepair. In 1989, the Cultural Association Verschönerungsverein Stuttgart, which owns a large part of Karlshöhe, had the basins and figures of the fountains restored.

A notice-board next to the fountain reads: "For the 150th anniversary in 2011, the cultural association Verschönerungsverein Stuttgart restored the statues of Athena, Pandora, Prometheus, the head of Zeus and the system of fountains." The fountain has been functioning normally since then.

== Appearance ==
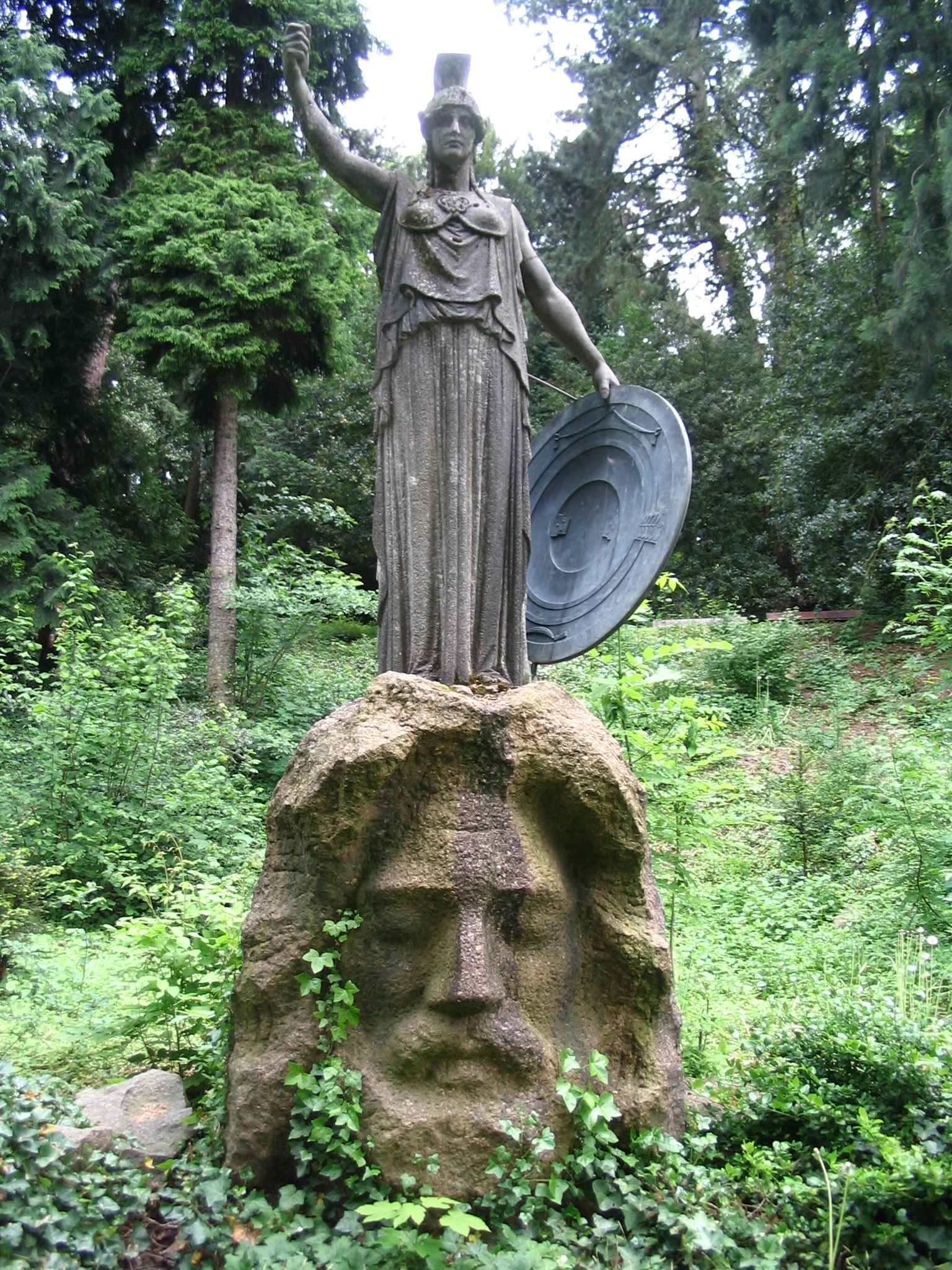
Bird of the Goddess Athena

In the center of the neoclassical fountain dominates the statue of the goddess Athena at the moment of her birth. According to Greek mythology – Hesiod's Theogony (886–900) – she emerged from the head of her father Zeus in full armor. (Note: "There the goddess (Athena) received [the aegis] whereby she excelled in strength all the deathless ones who dwell in Olympus, she who made the host-scaring weapon of Athena. And with it (Zeus) gave her birth, arrayed in arms of war." Hesiod, Theogony, translated by H.G. Evelyn-White; available at Hesiod, the Homeric Hymns and Homerica/The Theogony.) The stone statue of Athena wears a metal shield, spear, armor and helmet. Only the head of Zeus appears; this serves as a pedestal for the statue of the goddess.

Below the statue of Athena and the head of Zeus, two well basins lie like a staircase. Next to the lower basin, the stone figure of Prometheus can be seen on the right hand of Athena. On her left is the figure of Pandora with the famous box on her lap.

== Symbolism ==
The choice of the goddess Athena reflects how the Siegle family liked to see themselves. Athena is the protector of the city of Athens but moreover she is considered the goddess of wisdom and the patroness of the arts and sciences. Gustav and Julie Siegle were also generous supporters of cultural, social and scientific purposes. Not only was the first hospital (1893) in Feuerbach theirs, but also the Gustav-Siegle-Haus in Stuttgart in 1912, which was used for popular education.

Moreover, the system of fountains symbolizes the dual value of all human striving for knowledge. According to Greek mythology, Prometheus brought fire to men and was cruelly punished for his act by Zeus. On the other hand, Pandora brought all the evils to humanity by leaving them only hope.

Three years later, in 1914, Karl Donndorf undertook another work in Stuttgart on the ambivalence of good and bad with the Schicksalsbrunnen (Fountain of Destiny), composed of the Goddess of Fate in the center of a semicircle, on the left the statue of the allegory of pain, on the right the statue of the allegory of joy and love.

== Other photographs ==
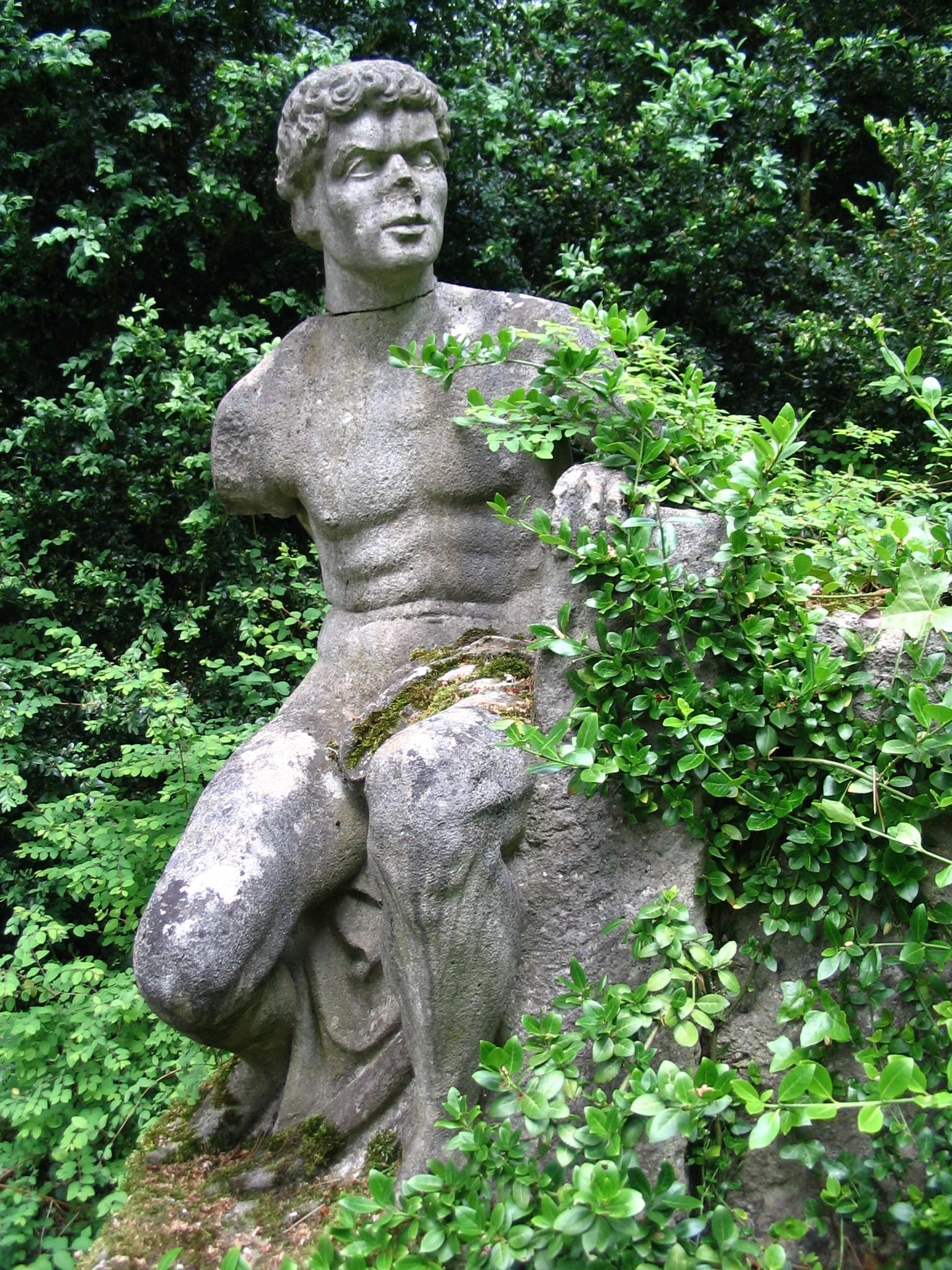
The statue of Prometheus

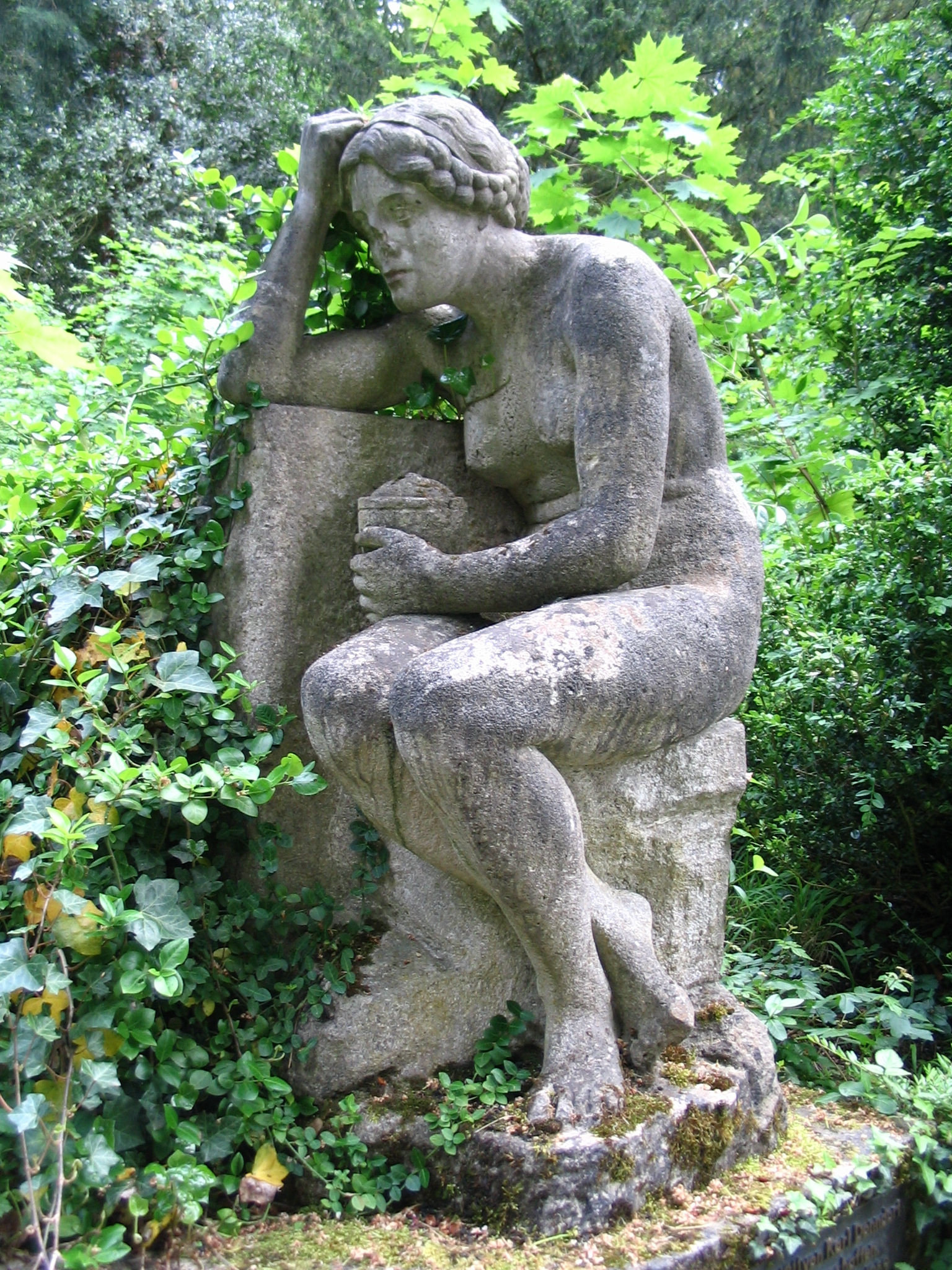
The statue of Pandora

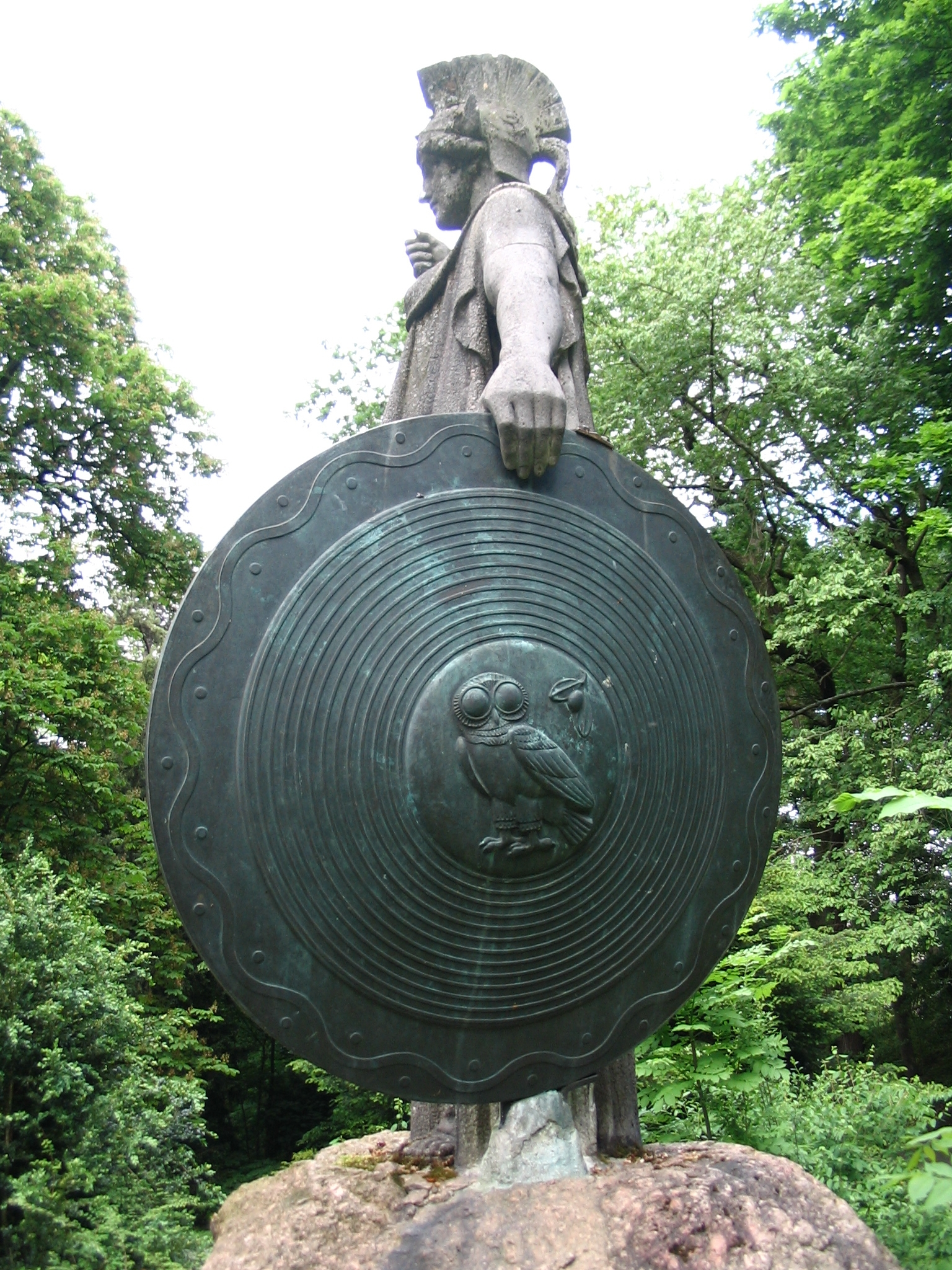
Athena's shield

== Literature ==
"Pallas-Athene-Brunnen." In: Bernd Langner and Wolfgang Kress, Ausblicke nach allen Richtungen: 150 Jahre Verschönerungsverein Stuttgart e.V.; 1861–2011. Stuttgart: Schönerungsverein Stuttgart, 2011; ISBN 9783000174599, page 171.
