= Eduard Stützel =

German woodcarver and sculptor

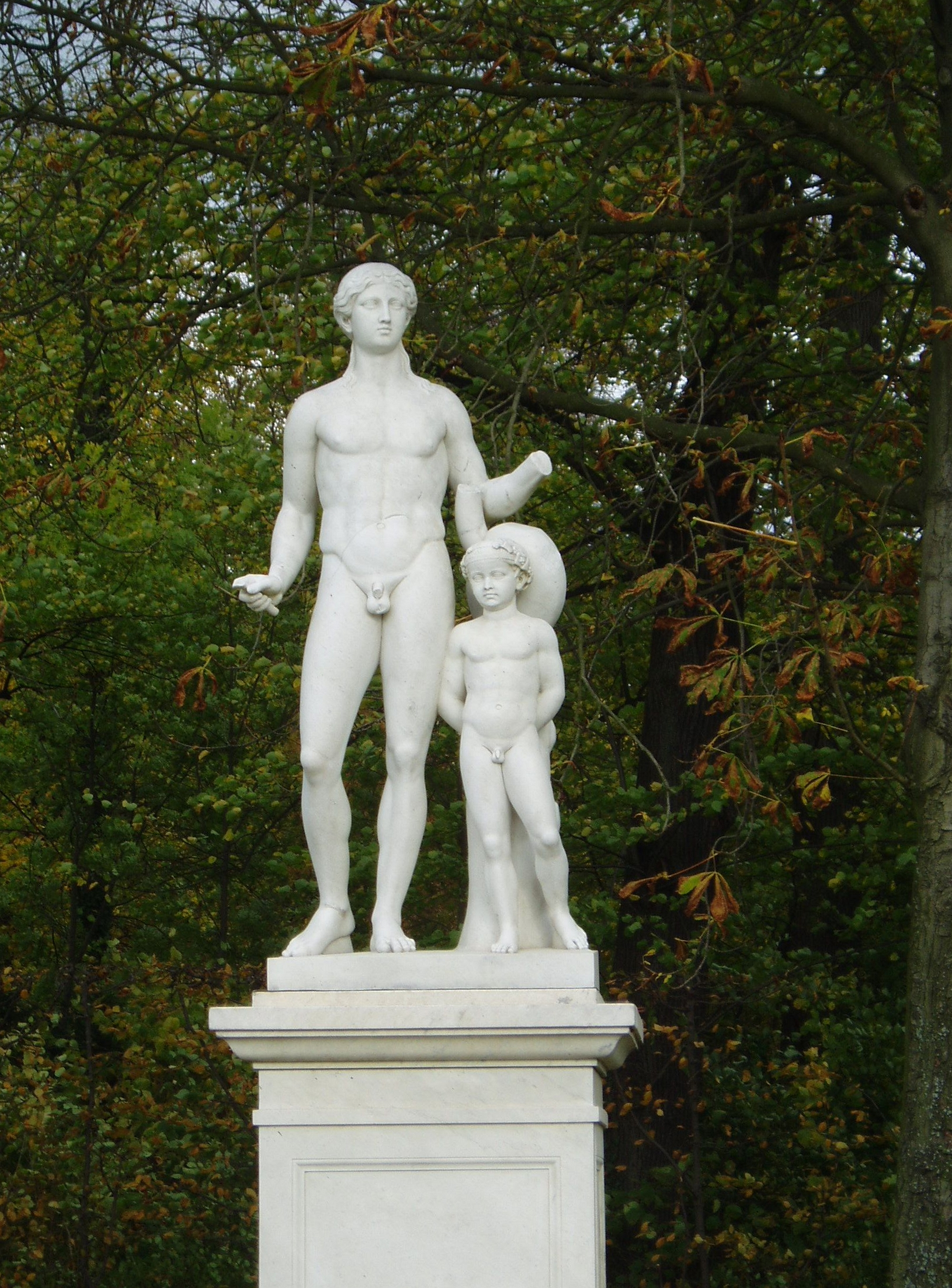
Apollo, with a youthful Mercury

Carl Heinrich Eduard Stützel, or Stietzel (11 June 1806, Berlin - after 1865) was a German wood carver and sculptor.

== Life and work ==
He completed his studies at the Prussian Academy of Arts. Between 1826 and 1840, he showed his woodwork at the Academy's exhibitions. This included statuettes of King Friedrich Wilhelm III and Johann Wolfgang von Goethe, done in boxwood. He also created busts and medallions, in marble and plaster of paris.

In 1840, he was summoned to Potsdam by King Friedrich Wilhelm IV, who was devoted to the construction of new building with sculptural decoration, and the restoration of old works of art. Some of the original figures at Sanssouci had been given to the Altes Museum, and its director, Ignaz von Olfers, was strongly opposed to putting them back in their original places. Stützel and several other artists were engaged to create replicas for the Neues Palais. Original busts and figures were also created, for new construction at Sanssouci and the Orangery Palace.

He married Hermine Charlotte Helene Krutisch in 1836. One of their children was the sculptor, Hermann Eduard Otto Stützel (1837-1862).
