= Louis Sussmann-Hellborn =

German sculptor

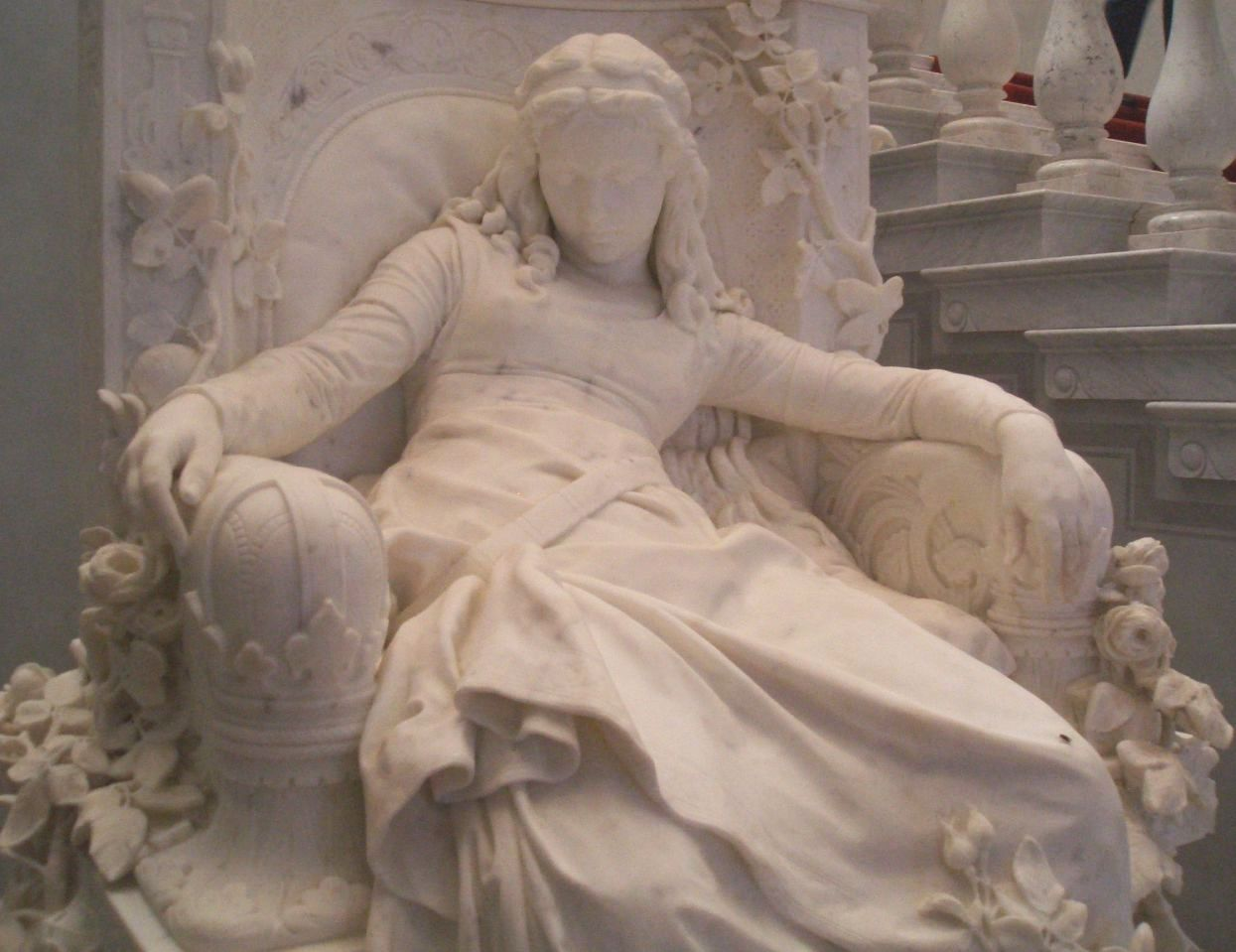
"Sleeping Beauty", by Louis Sußmann-Hellborn

Louis Sussmann-Hellborn (born as Ludwig Sussmann March 20, 1828 – August 15, 1908), also spelled Louis Sußmann-Hellborn, was a German sculptor, painter, art collector and contractor.

== Life ==
Louis Sussmann-Hellborn was born in Berlin.

Louis Sussmann-Hellborn received his training as a sculptor at the Berlin Academy of Arts. He traveled to study in France, Belgium and England. He lived In Rome from 1852 to 1856. The first major exhibition of his works was organized in Berlin in 1856. His villa at Tiergarten was one of the most representative buildings of the district and made him famous within the educated society of Berlin. In 1875 Arnold Bocklin bought Sussmann Hellborn's painting "Meeresidylle" ("Sea Idyll", aka "Triton and Nereid") for 10,000 marks (it was later at the National Gallery, and it's missing since 1945).

He was one of the founders of the Royal Museum of Decorative Arts and was also involved in building a sculpture collection at the Royal Museum in Berlin. From 1882 to 1887, Sussmann-Hellborn was head of the Royal Porcelain Manufactory (KPM) in Berlin. Otto Lessing (1846–1912) and he were at that time the only sculptors in the Berlin Association of Architects, which had probably to do with his work as an excellent sculptor.

Louis Sussmann-Hellborn was married to the celebrated beauty Bertha Hellborn.

He died in Berlin and is buried at the Jewish cemetery Schönhauser Allee.

== Works (selection) ==
- After 1852 to 1856: Italian braid; drunken Faun; Abandoned Psyche, Cupid in arms; boy as candelabra carrier; relief portrait of Edward Magnus, Alter Dorotheenstädtischer and Friedrich Werderscher Berlin cemetery
- 1862: Statue of King Frederick II of Brzeg
- 1869: Statue of King Frederick II for the ballroom of the Red City Hall (destroyed) statue of King Friedrich Wilhelm III for the ballroom of the Red Town Hall
- 1875: The German song (an allegorical group of maidens called "folk song" and "art song"), original cast in the socket building of the National Monument for the Liberation Wars on the Kreuzberg, with a copy of it made by Hans Starcke in the Tiergarten, Berlin
- 1878: Sleeping Beauty, Old National Gallery; Lutenist, Old National Gallery.
- 1881: Hans Holbein's seated figure, Martin-Gropius-Bau in Berlin (heavily damaged), seated figure of Peter Vischer, Martin-Gropius-Bau in Berlin (severely damaged).
- Numerous sculptural works.
- Numerous designs for decorative enamel work for the company Ravené & Sussman-Hellborn.

== See also ==
- Volksgesang, Tiergarten
