= Statue of Marshal Keith, Peterhead =

Statue in Aberdeenshire, Scotland

Statue of Marshal Keith
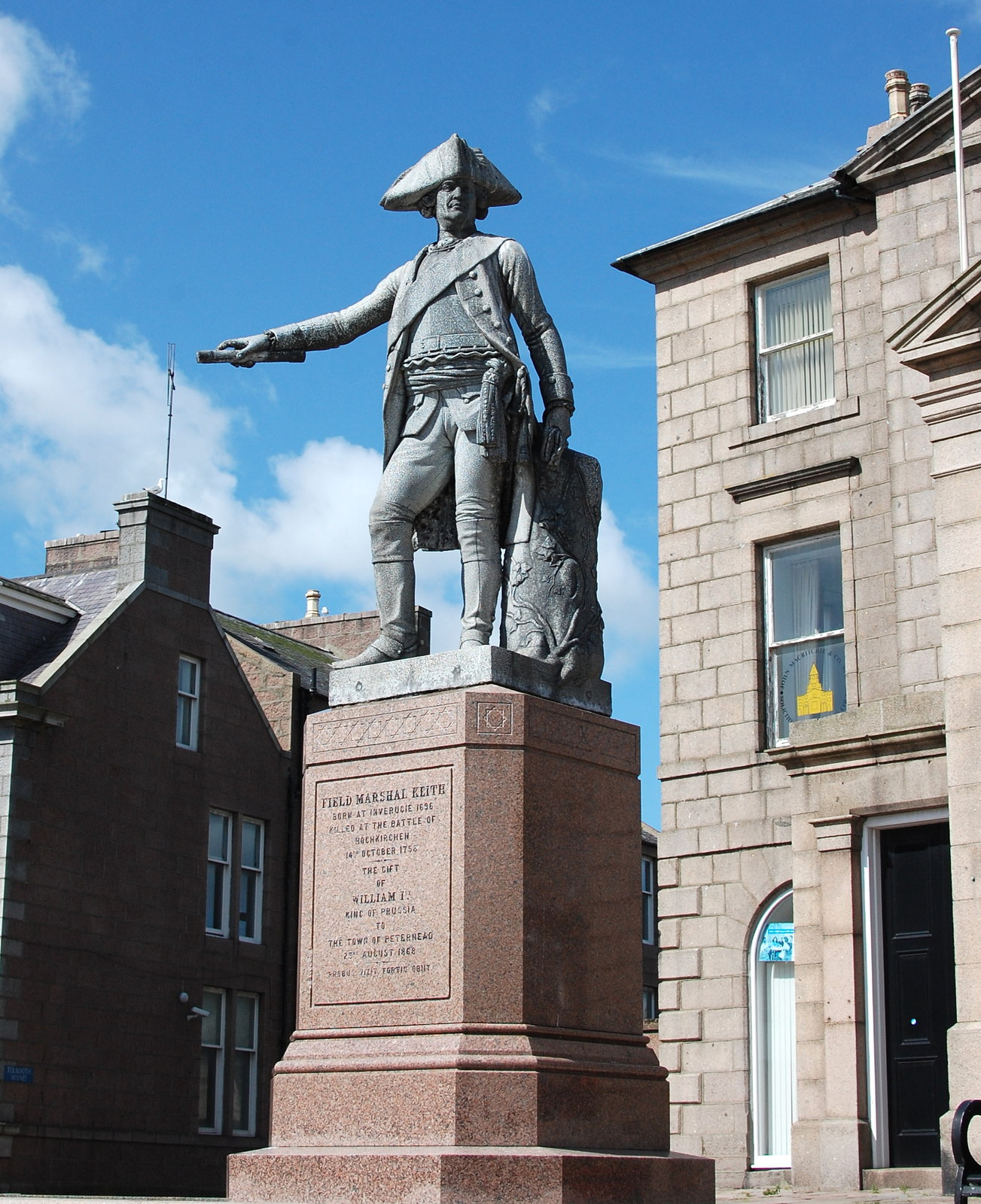
- The statue in 2015
- Interactive map of Statue of Marshal Keith
- Location: Broad Street; Peterhead; Scotland
- Coordinates: 57°30′17.6″N 1°46′39.1″W
- Type: Statue
- Material: Zinc
- Opening date: 1868
- Dedicated to: James Francis Edward Keith

The Statue of Marshal Keith is a Category B listed monument on Broad Street in Peterhead, Scotland, dedicated to James Keith, a Scottish soldier and Generalfeldmarschall of the Royal Prussian Army. The statue, which stands in front of the Peterhead Town House and faces east (Keith's head is turned to the northeast), was presented by William I, German Emperor. It is a zinc replica of one made of marble that originally stood in Wilhelmplatz, Berlin, but is now in that city's Bode Museum.

== See also ==
- List of listed buildings in Peterhead, Aberdeenshire
- Statue of Marshal Keith, Berlin
