= Statue of Marshal Keith, Berlin =

Statue in Berlin, Germany

Statue of Marshal Keith
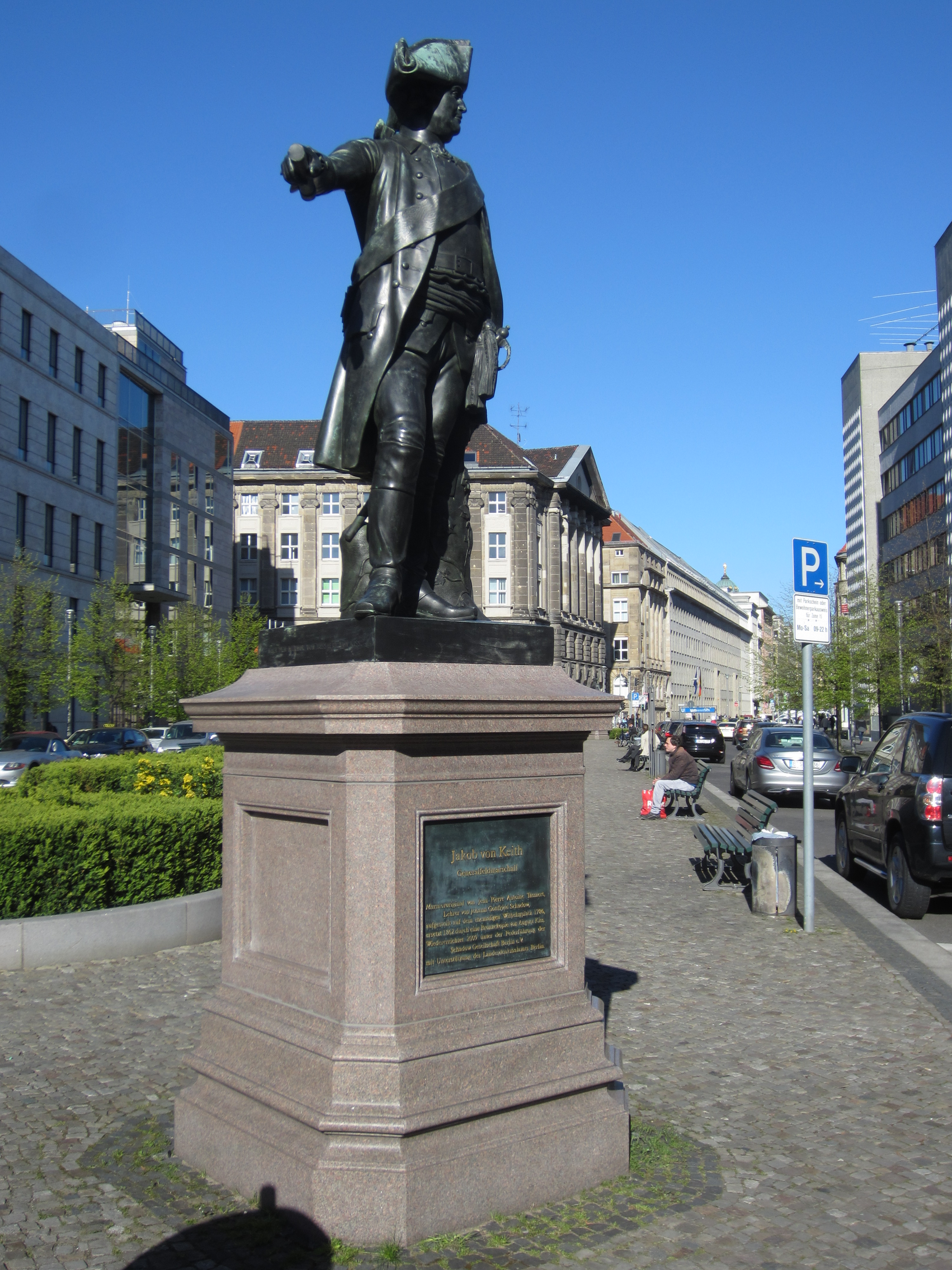
- The sculpture in 2016
- Artist: Antoine Tassaert
- Subject: James Francis Edward Keith
- Location: Berlin, Germany

The statue of James Francis Edward Keith is a bronze sculpture installed at Zietenplatz in Berlin, Germany.

The statue is one of six statues of Prussian military officers on the former Wilhelmplatz in Berlin. In 1857, on the advice of Christian Daniel Rauch, the sculptor August Kiss made bronze versions of the marble statues. The original statues are in the Bode Museum in Berlin.

A replica of the statue was gifted in 1868 to Peterhead, Keith's birthplace in Scotland, by William I, King of Prussia, in recognition of the marshal's loyalty to the Prussian Army under Frederick the Great.

== See also ==
- Statue of Friedrich Wilhelm von Seydlitz
