= Pony und Knappe =

Sculpture in Berlin, Germany

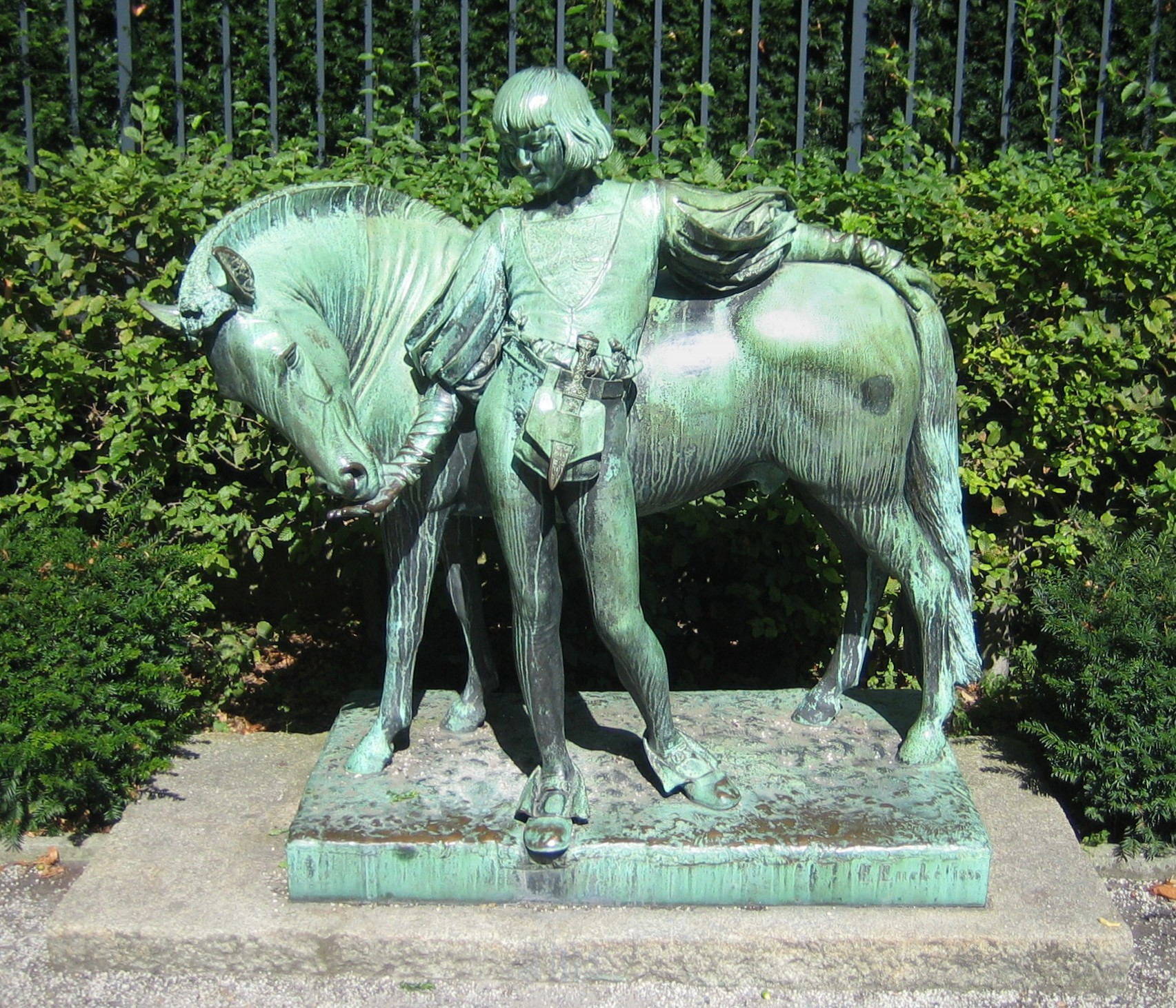
- The statue in 2009
- Artist: Erdmann Encke
- Year: 1896; 130 years ago
- Medium: Bronze
- Location: Berlin, Germany

Pony und Knappe (English: Pony and squire) is an outdoor 1896 bronze sculpture by German sculptor Erdmann Encke, has initially installed in the park of Bellevue Palace, Germany located in Central Berlin. Then moved to Fuchsiengarten in 1958. The sculpture now stands in the English Garden within the larger Tiergarten in Berlin.

The work itself depicts a boy standing on a rectangular gray granite slab with his back to his pony. He is seen feeding his pony with his right hand, which turns its head towards the boy's hand. His other hand rests on his pony's rump.
