= Dornröschen (Sussmann-Hellborn) =

Marble sculpture by Louis Sussmann-Hellborn

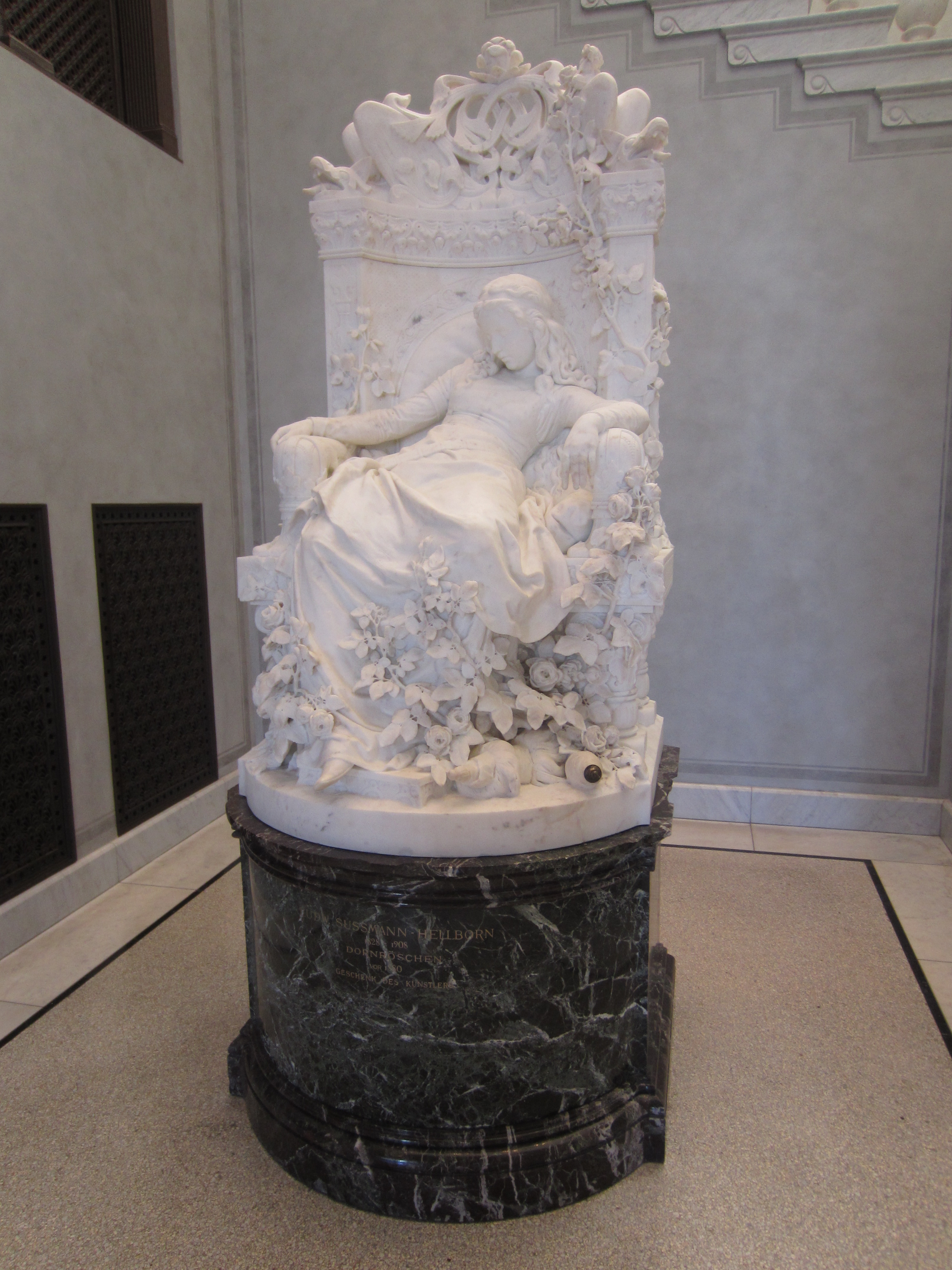
- The sculpture in 2016
- Artist: Louis Sussmann-Hellborn
- Location: Alte Nationalgalerie, Berlin, Germany

Dornröschen (English: Sleeping Beauty) is a marble sculpture by Louis Sussmann-Hellborn, housed at Alte Nationalgalerie in Berlin, Germany.

Description (translated) from the catalog:

Sleeping Beauty sits slumbering in the throne chair, decorated with fantastic Romanesque ornamentation, her arms resting on the armrests; her feet are covered by rampant roses that climb up the chair, and the fateful spindle lies on the floor - Inscribed L. Sussmann, Berlin. Carrara marble, life-size figure. Gift from the artist in 1888

The features of the sculpture are apparently based on the Brothers Grimm version of the fairy tale, Sleeping Beauty. The sculpture was completed a few years prior to the premier of Sleeping Beauty Ballet.
