= Löwenkämpfer =

Equestrian statue in Berlin, Germany

- English: The Lion Fighter
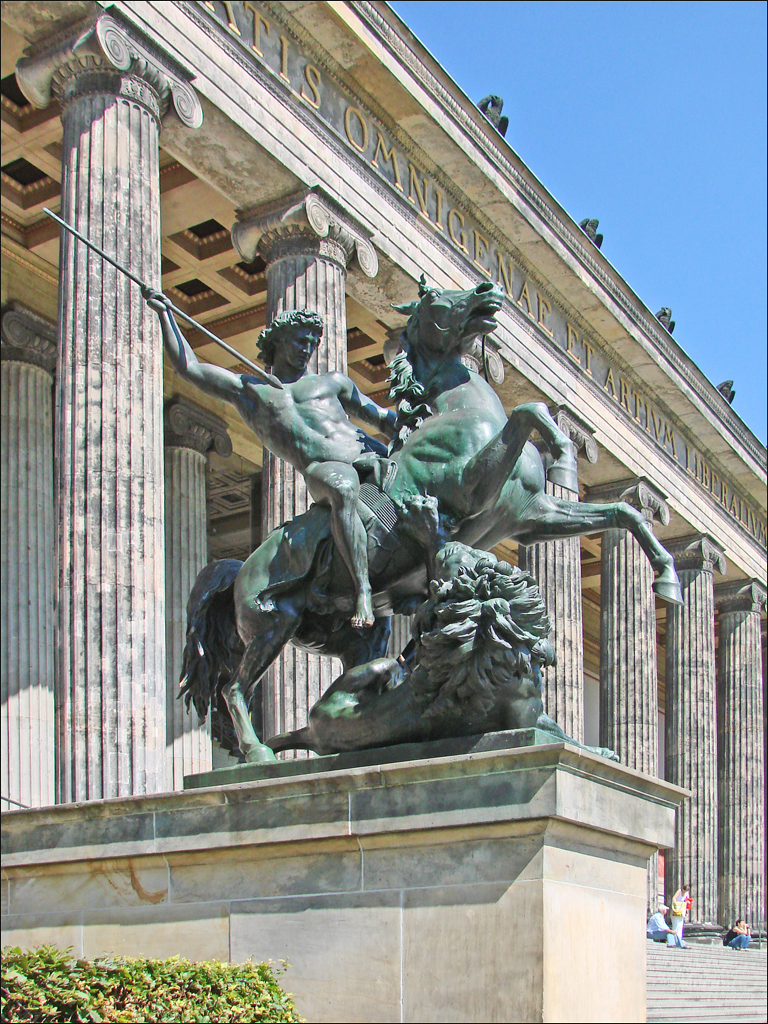
- The sculpture in 2011
- Artist: Albert Wolff
- Year: 1858
- Location: Berlin, Germany
- 52°31′08″N 13°23′55″E

Löwenkämpfer (The Lion Fighter) is an 1858 bronze equestrian statue by Albert Wolff, installed outside the Altes Museum in Berlin, Germany. An 1892 copy stands in front of the Philadelphia Museum of Art. The companion piece is Amazone zu Pferde, also installed outside the Altes Museum.

== See also ==
- 1858 in art
