= Volksgesang =

Sculpture in Berlin, Germany

- Artist: Louis Sussmann-Hellborn
- Location: Tiergarten in Berlin, Germany

Volksgesang is a sculpture by Louis Sussmann-Hellborn, installed in the Tiergarten in Berlin, Germany.

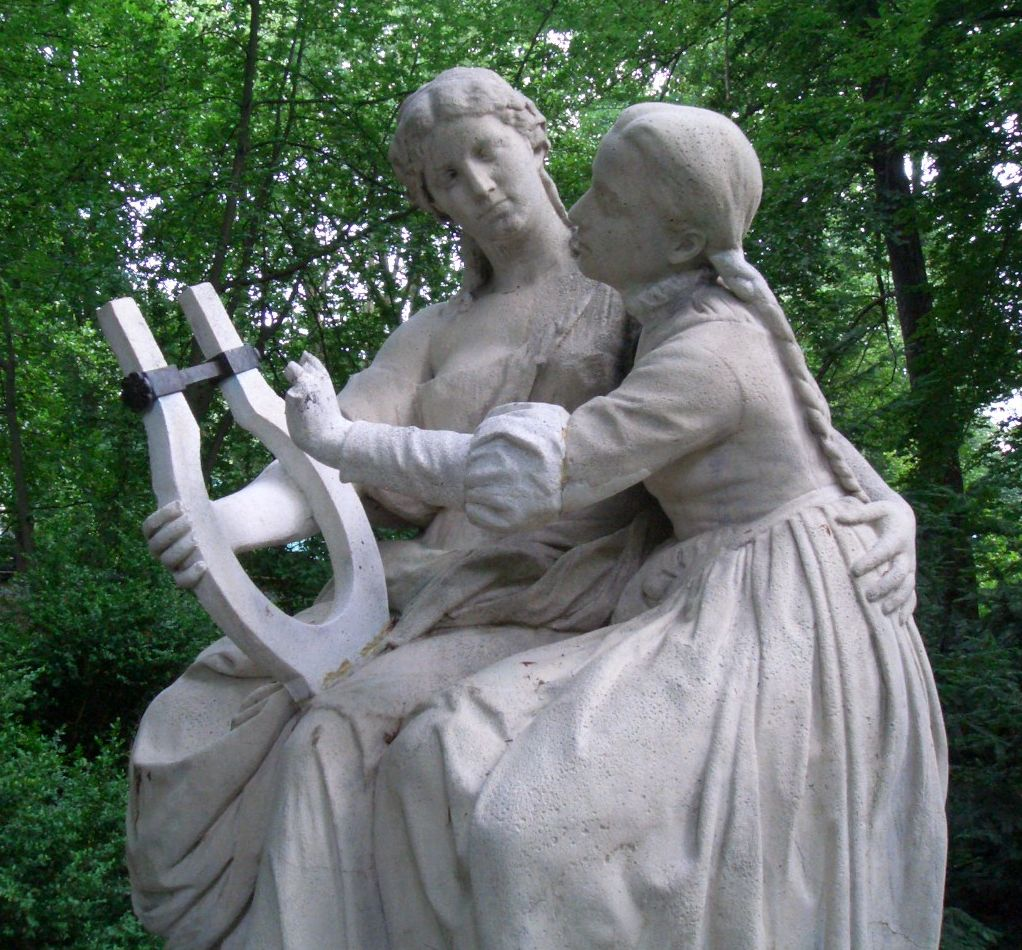
2007

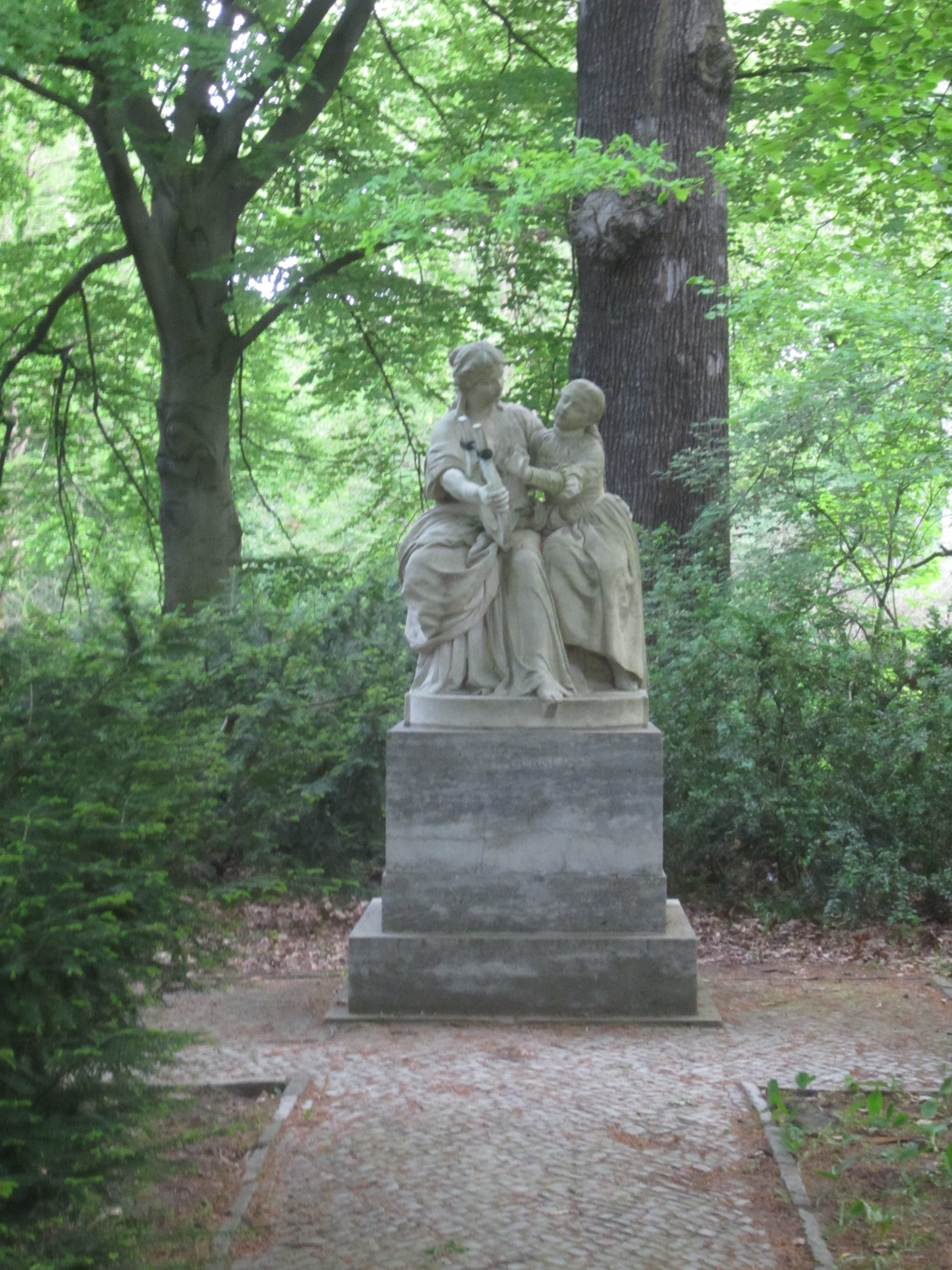
2015
