= Indischer Brunnen =

Fountain in Berlin, Germany

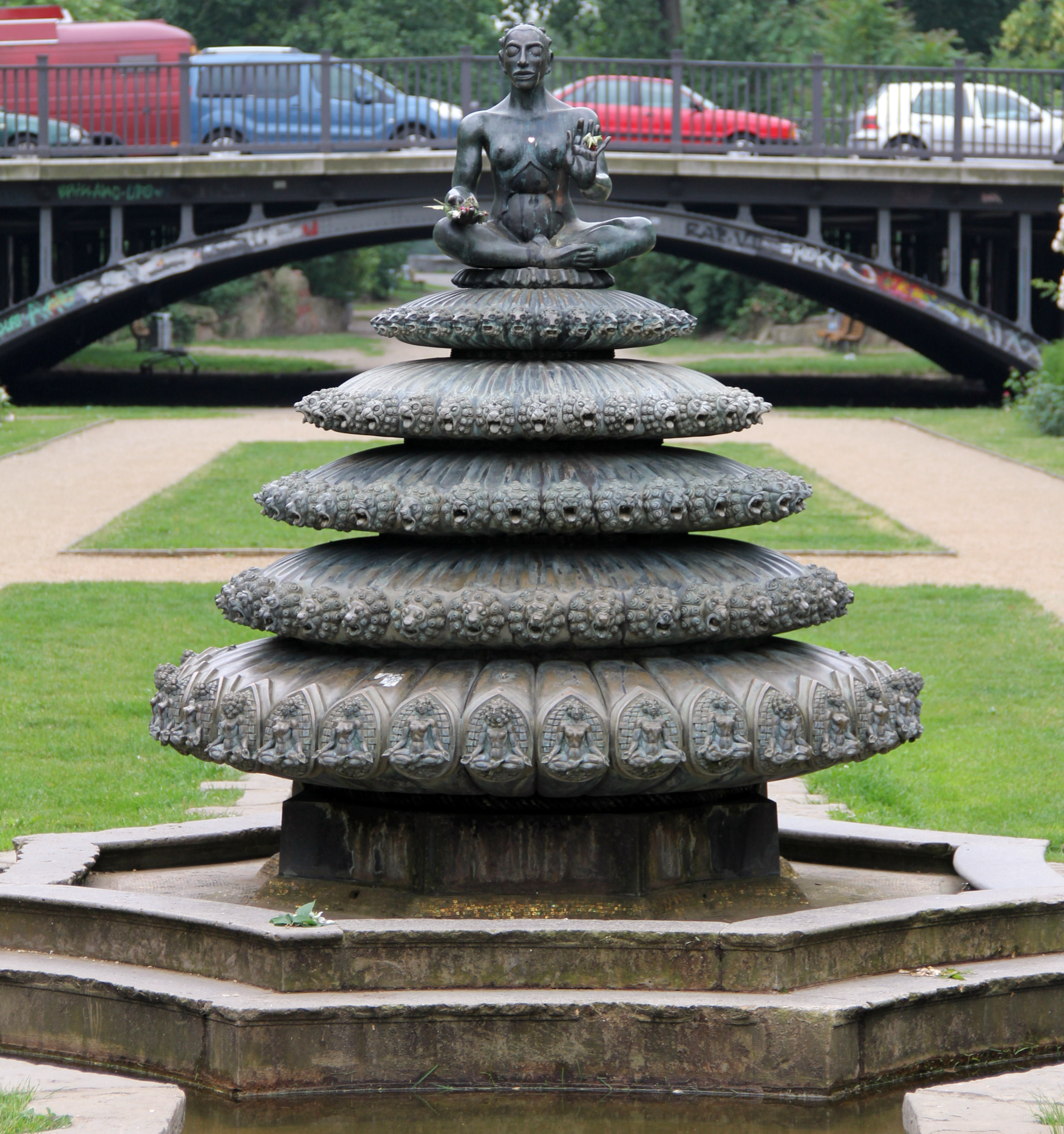
- The fountain in 2012
- Location: Berlin, Germany
- 52°30′17″N 13°25′03″E

Indischer Brunnen (German for "Indian Fountain") is a fountain at Luisenstadt Canal in Mitte, Berlin, Germany.
