= Borghese Gladiators =

Statues in Charlottenburg, Berlin, Germany

- German: Borghesischer Fechter
- The statues with Charlottenburg Palace in the background in 2012
- Location: Berlin, Germany

The Borghese Gladiators (German: Borghesischer Fechter) are a pair of statues outside Charlottenburg Palace in Berlin, Germany.

== See also ==
- Borghese Gladiator, the classical sculpture in the Louvre
