= Hunne zu Pferde =

Sculpture by Erich Hösel

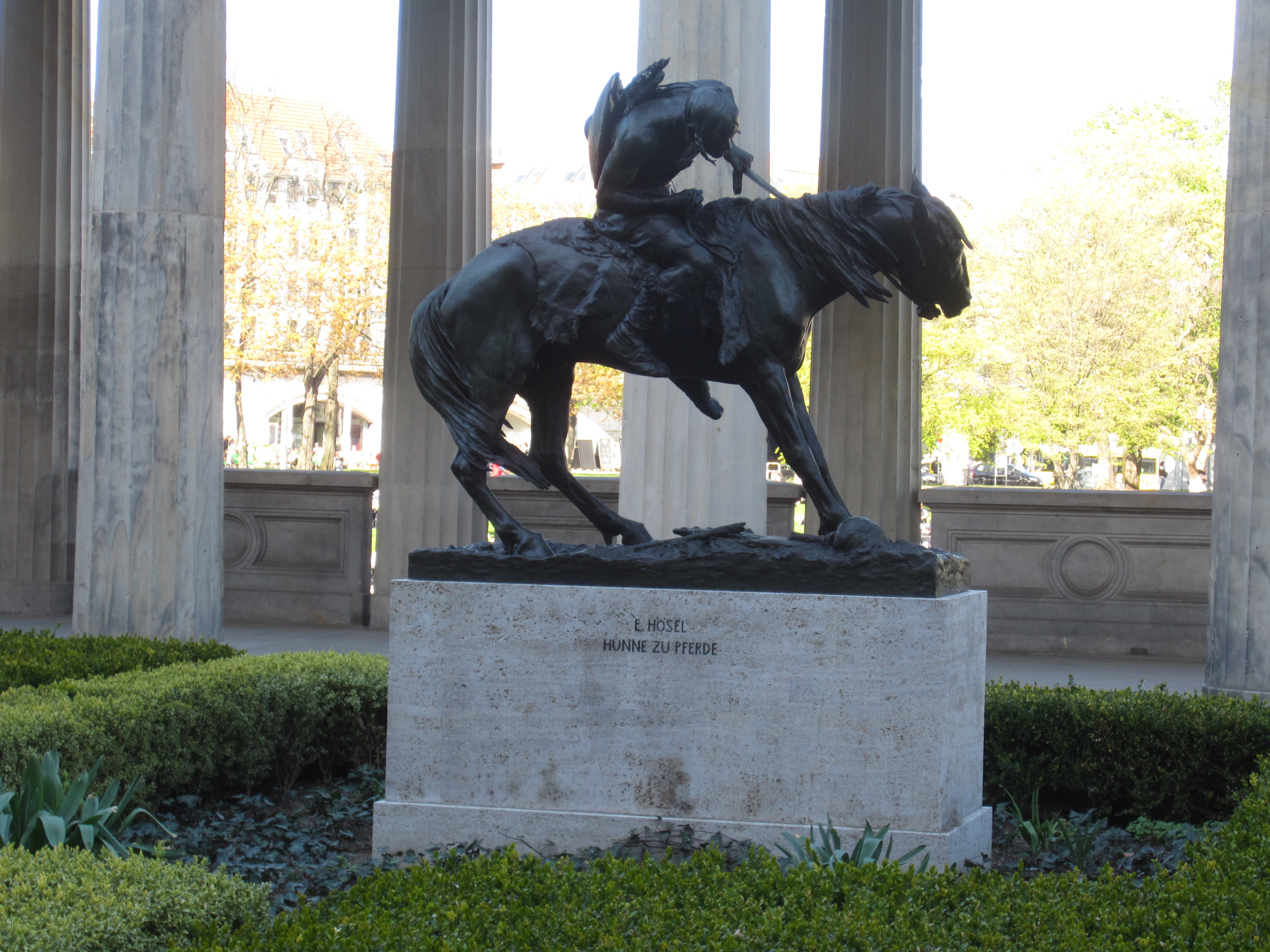
- The sculpture in 2016
- Artist: Erich Hösel
- Type: Sculpture
- Location: Alte Nationalgalerie; Berlin, Germany

Hunne zu Pferde is a sculpture by Erich Hösel, installed outside the Alte Nationalgalerie in Berlin, Germany.
