= Bülow Memorial, Berlin =

Bülow Memorial
- Bülow-Denkmal (German)
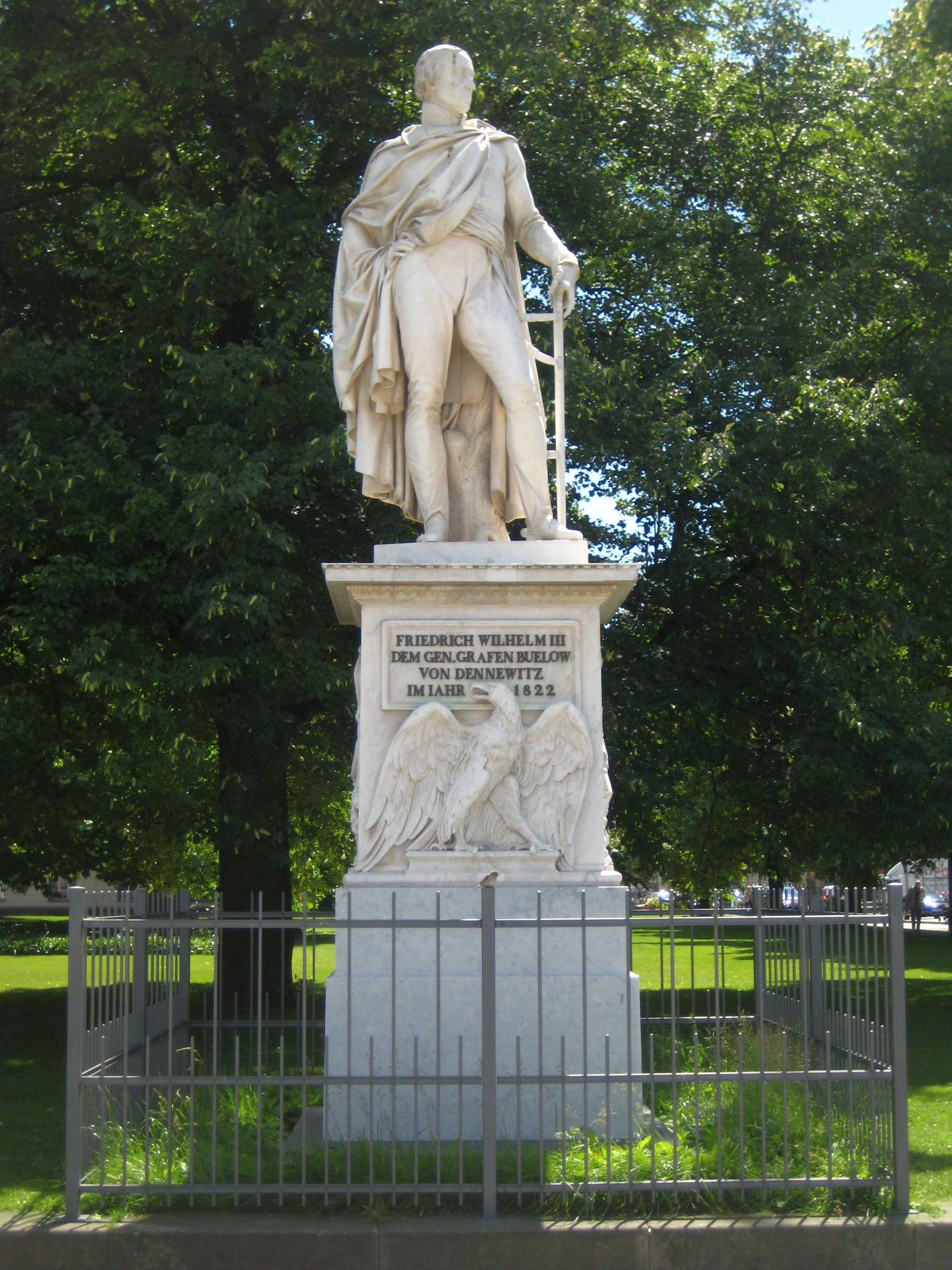
- Artist: Christian Daniel Rauch
- Year: 1822
- Medium: Marble
- Dimensions: 5.73 m (18.8 ft)
- Location: Unter den Linden, Berlin, Germany; 52°31′02″N 13°23′44″E

The Bülow Memorial on Unter den Linden avenue in Berlin's Mitte district commemorates the Prussian army general and freedom fighter Friedrich Wilhelm Bülow von Dennewitz (1755–1816). Created from 1819 to 1822 by Christian Daniel Rauch in neoclassical style, it is a masterpiece of the Berlin school of sculpture.

Until 1951 the memorial stood to the left of the Neue Wache, with which it formed an urban ensemble, and since 2002 it has stood opposite it. The marble statue was removed in 2021 due to weathering and will be replaced by a replica. In this context the re-erection at the original location is being discussed.

== Gallery ==
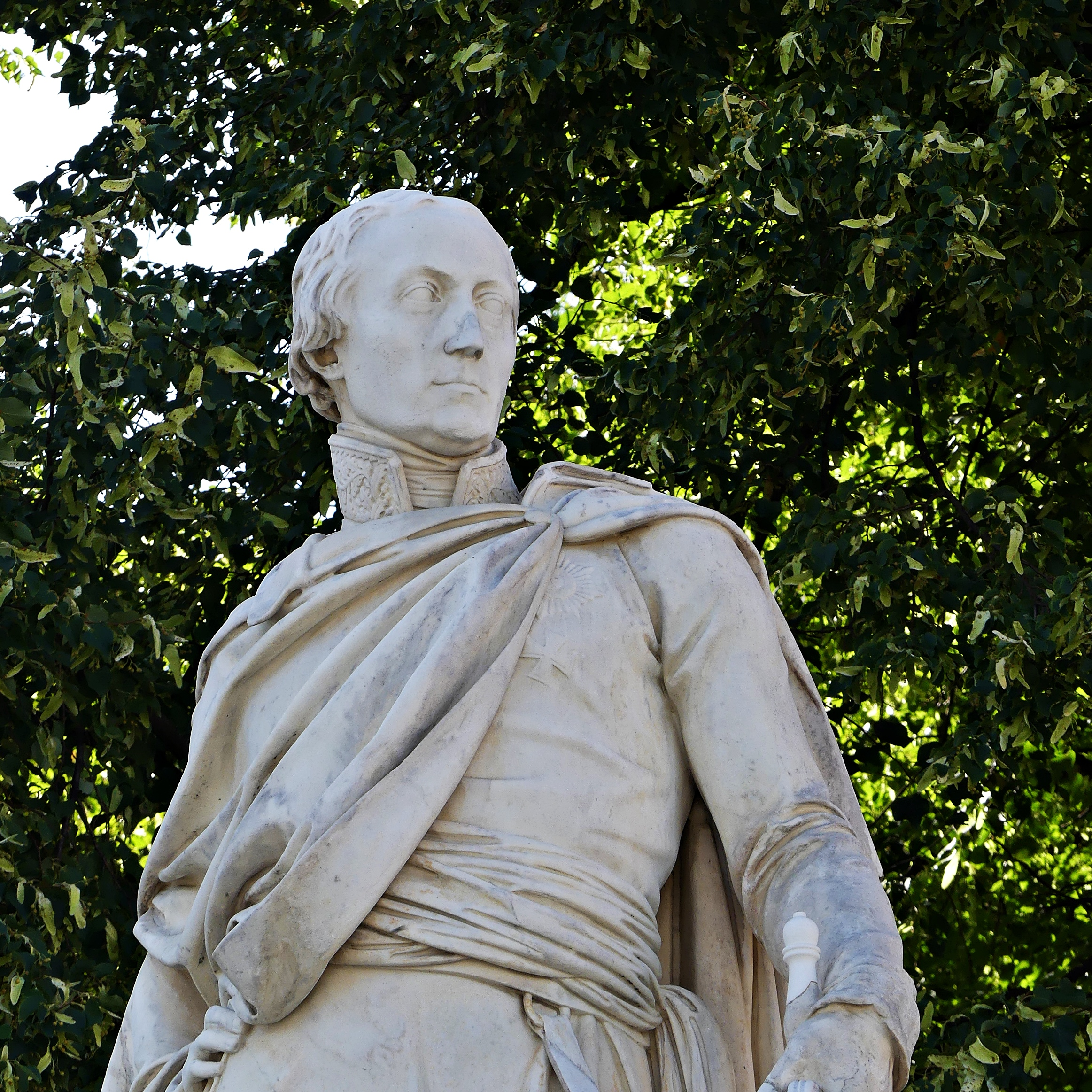
Bülow statue

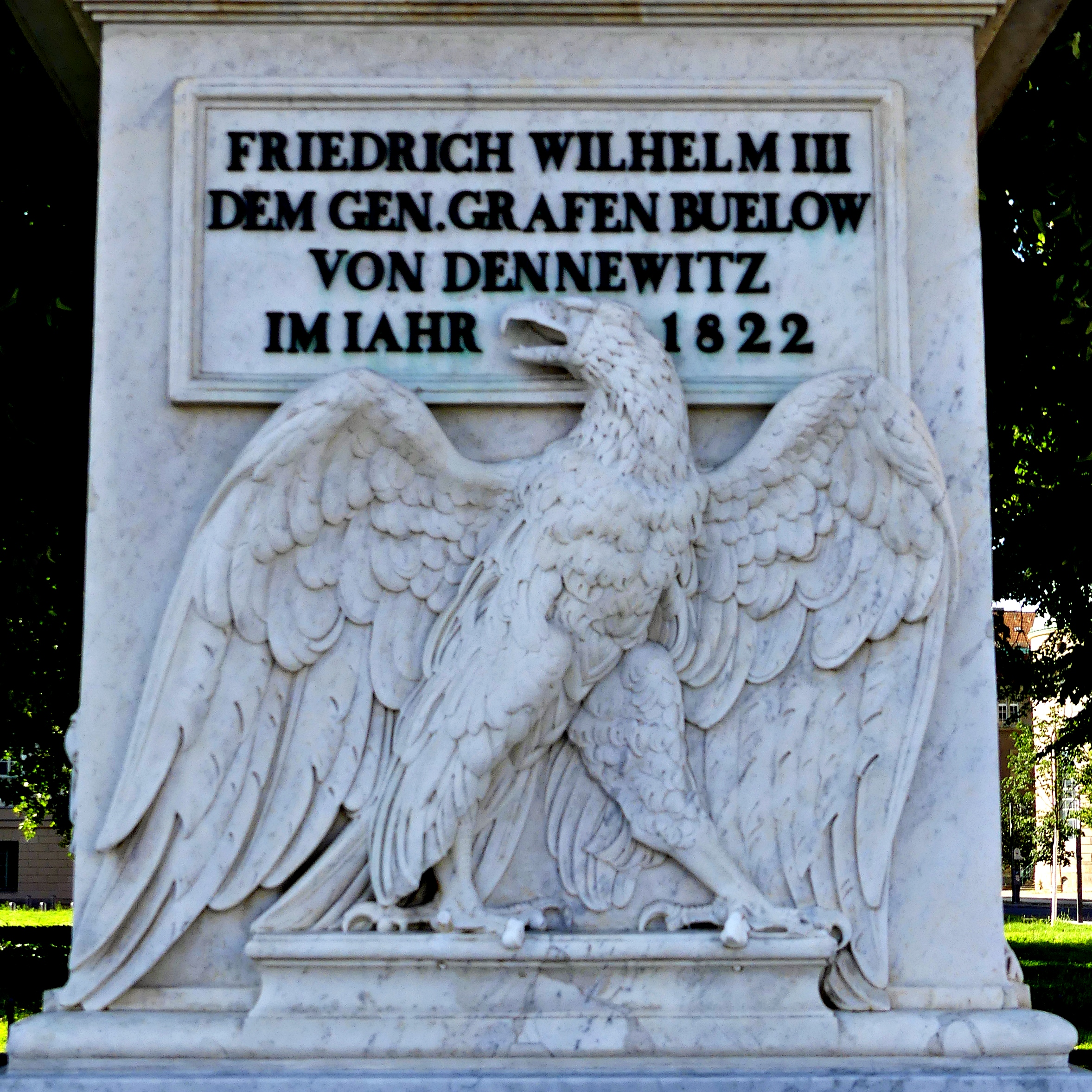
Front relief

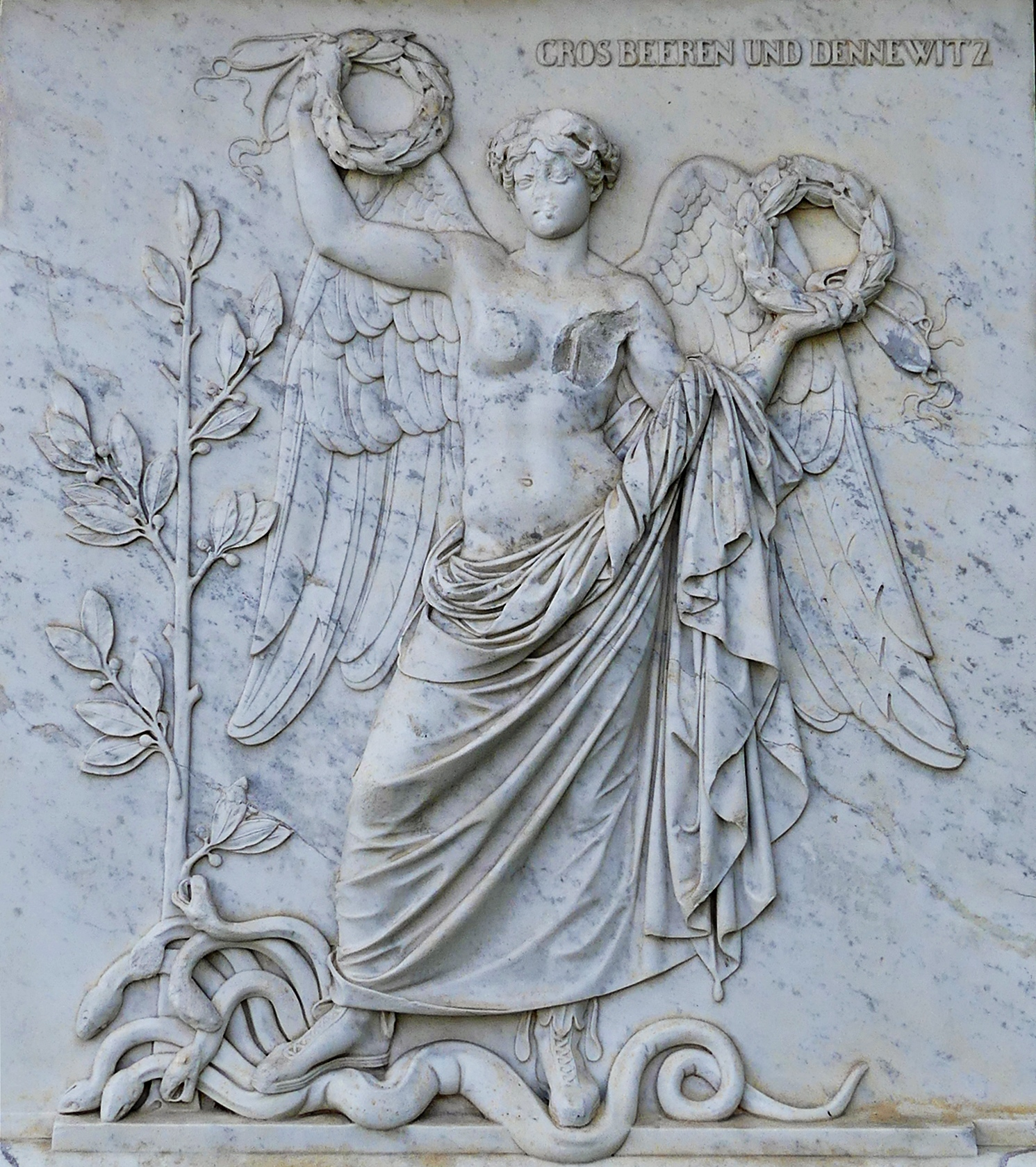
Right relief

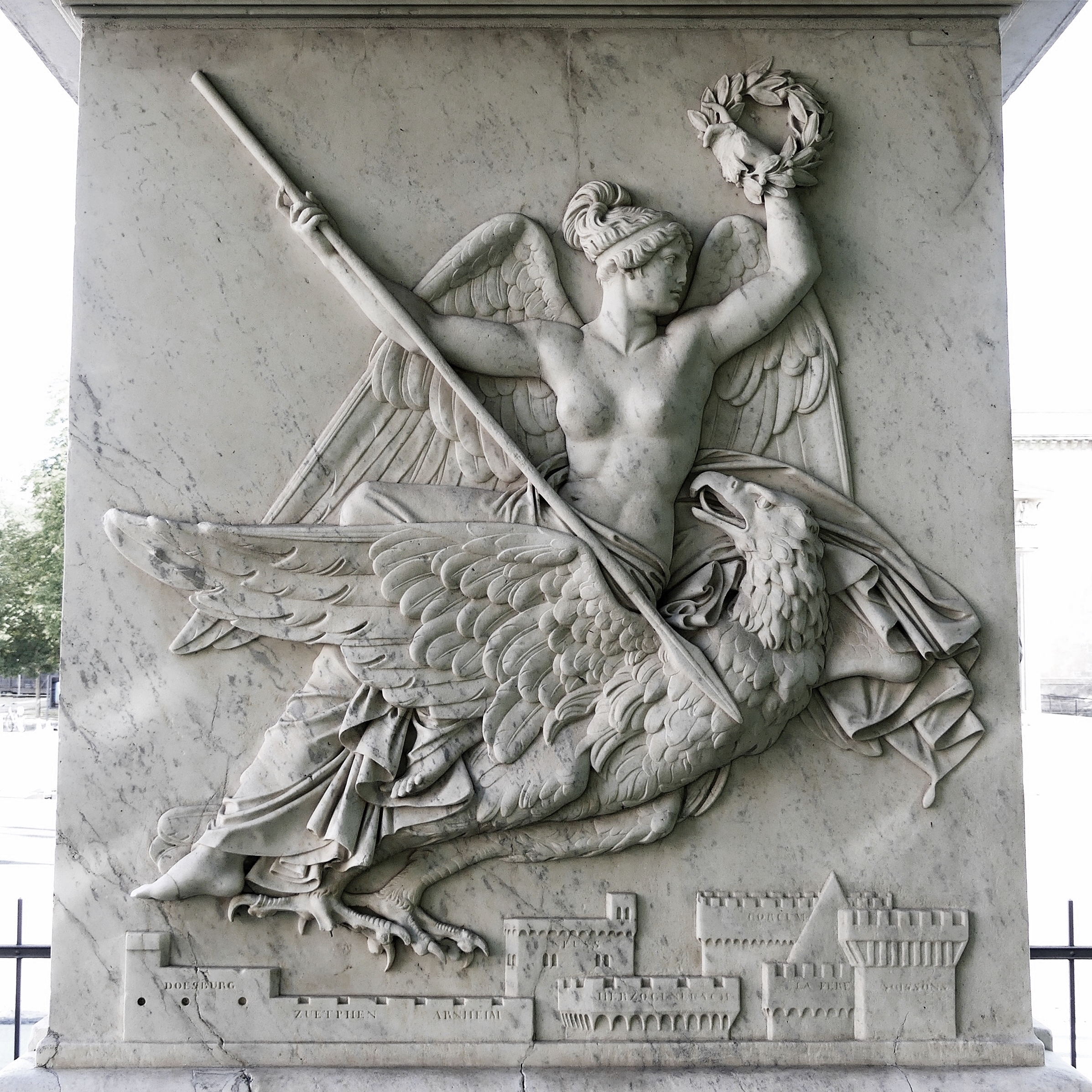
Back relief

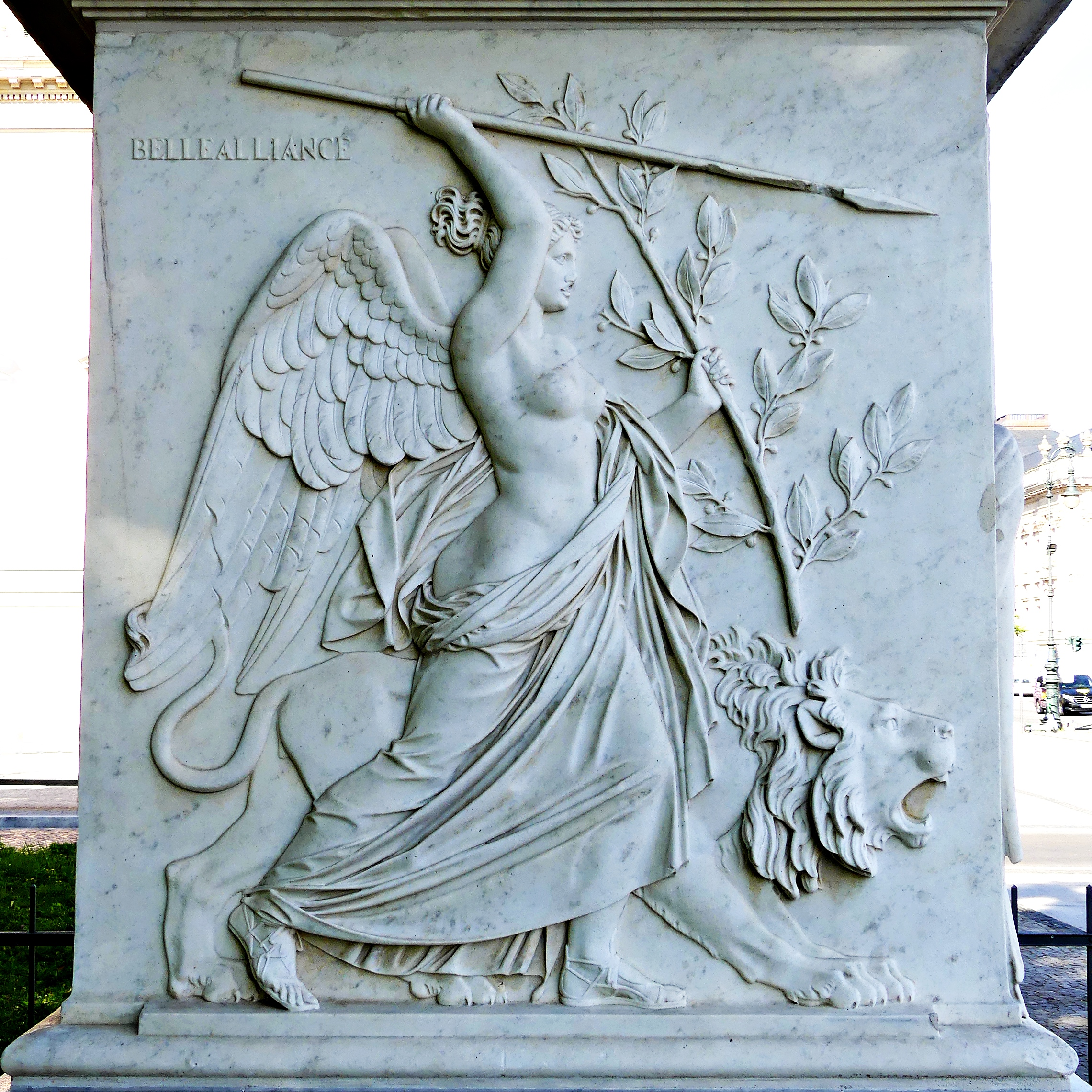
Left relief

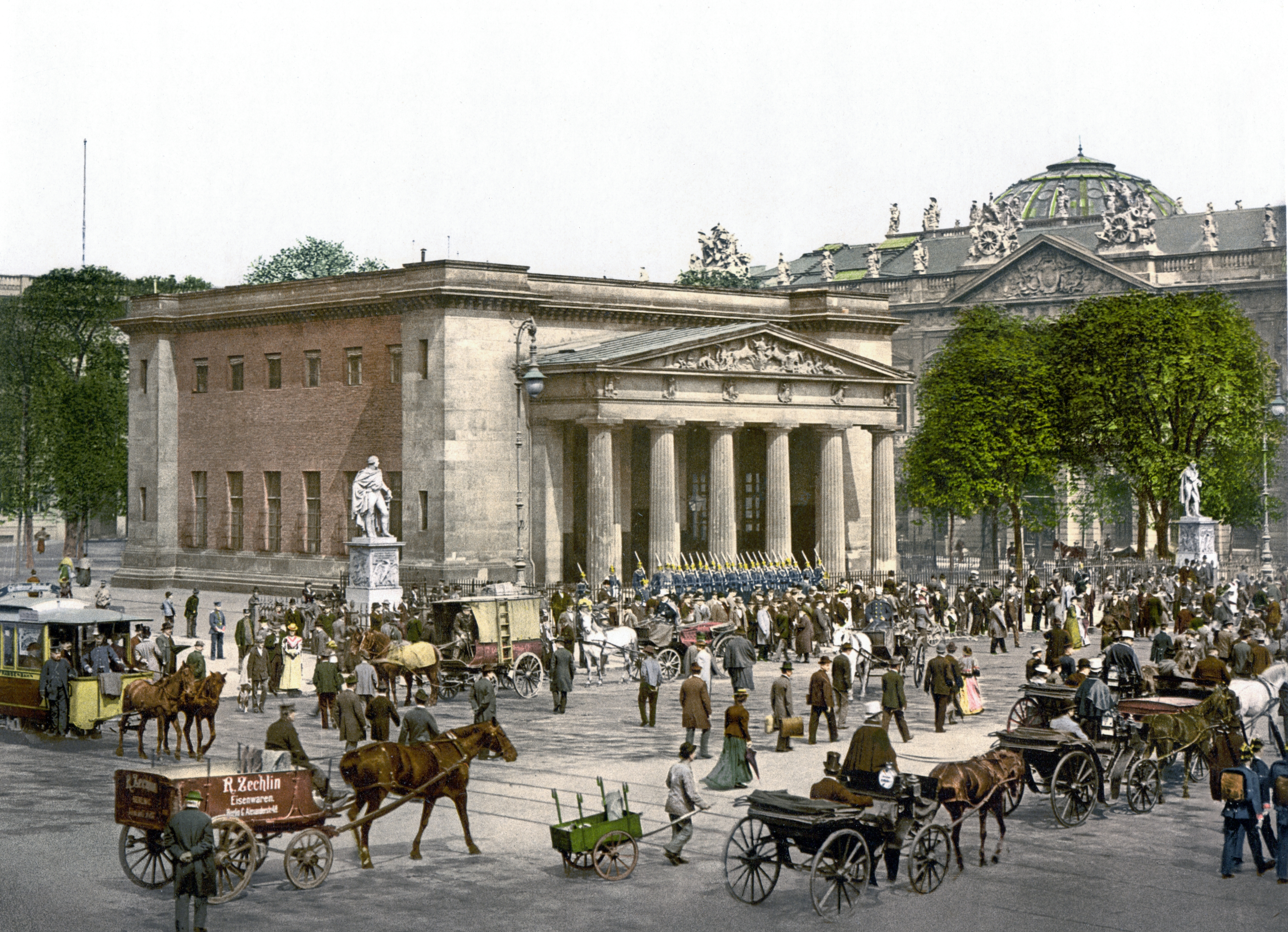
Original location at Neue Wache

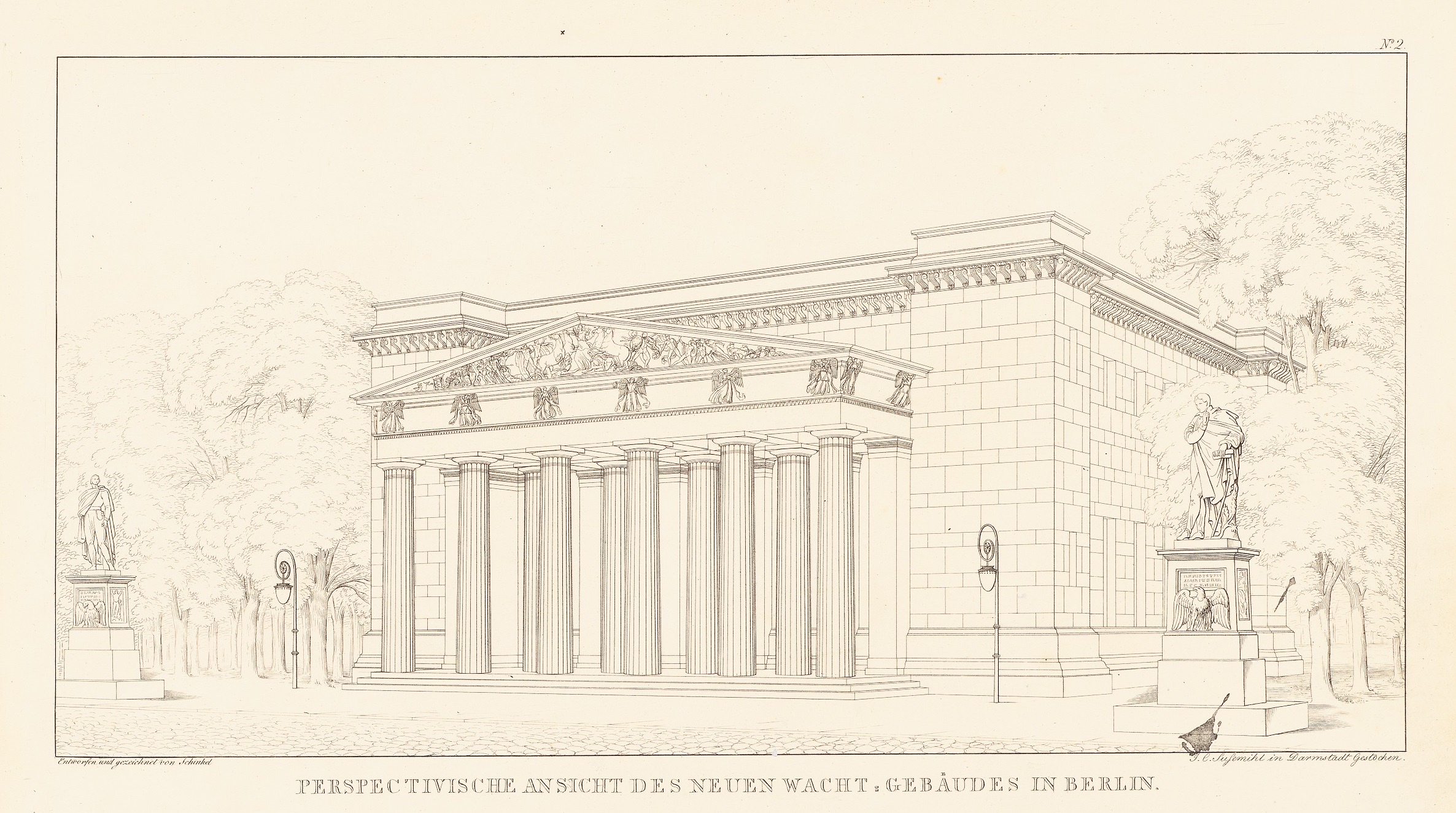
Drawing by Karl Friedrich Schinkel

Painting by Franz Krüger

== See also ==
- Scharnhorst Memorial, Berlin
