= Erdmann Encke =

German sculptor

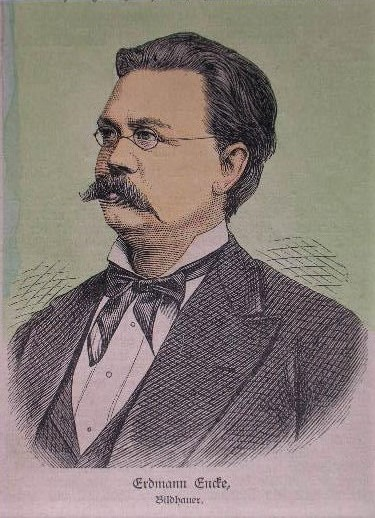
Portrait of Erdmann Encke (c. 1880)

Erdmann Encke (26 January 1843 – 7 July 1896) was a German sculptor.

== Biography ==
Encke was born in Berlin. He studied at the academy in Berlin and with Albert Wolff. Several of the finest pieces of statuary in Berlin were designed by him, among them the following: “Friedrich Ludwig Jahn,” bronze statue (Hasenheide, Berlin); “Frederick I, Elector of Brandenburg” (Façade of Town Hall, Berlin); “Queen Louise of Prussia” (Thiergarten, Berlin); and the sarcophagi of Emperor William I and Empress Augusta in the mausoleum at Charlottenburg. He also executed a number of important bronze portrait busts, in which he used polychromy with success. He was appointed a professor of the Berlin Academy in 1883. He died, aged 53, at Babelsberg.

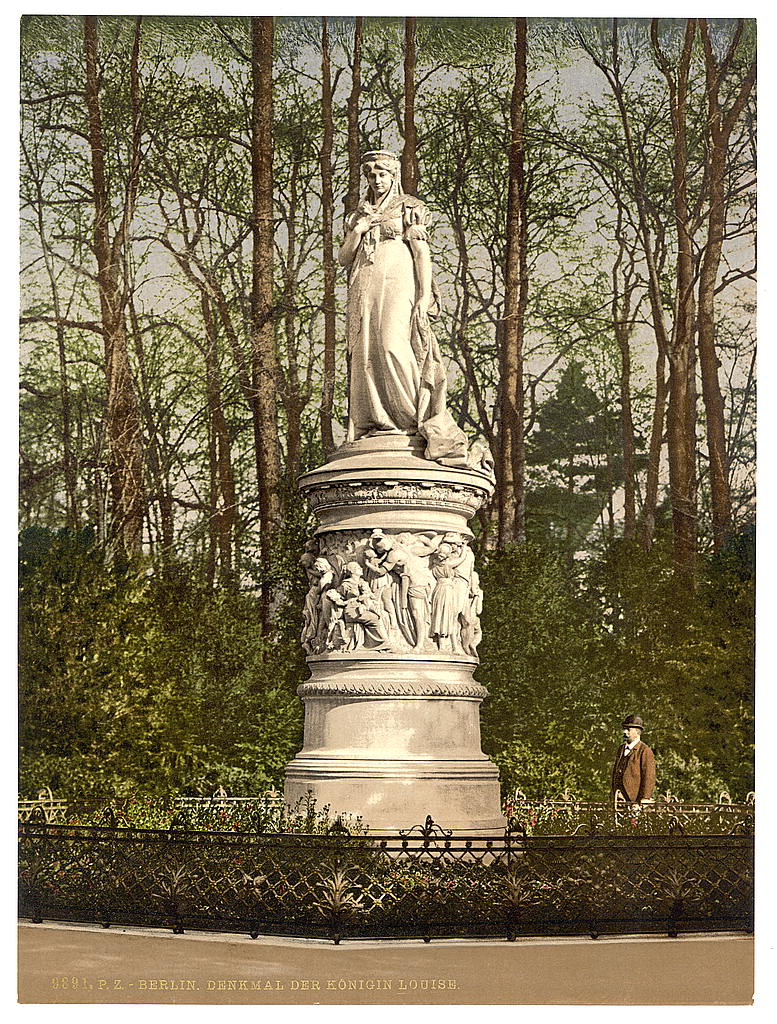
Queen Louise of Prussia, Großer Tiergarten (today occupied by a cement copy)
