= Scharnhorst Memorial, Berlin =

Scharnhorst Memorial
- Scharnhorst-Denkmal (German)
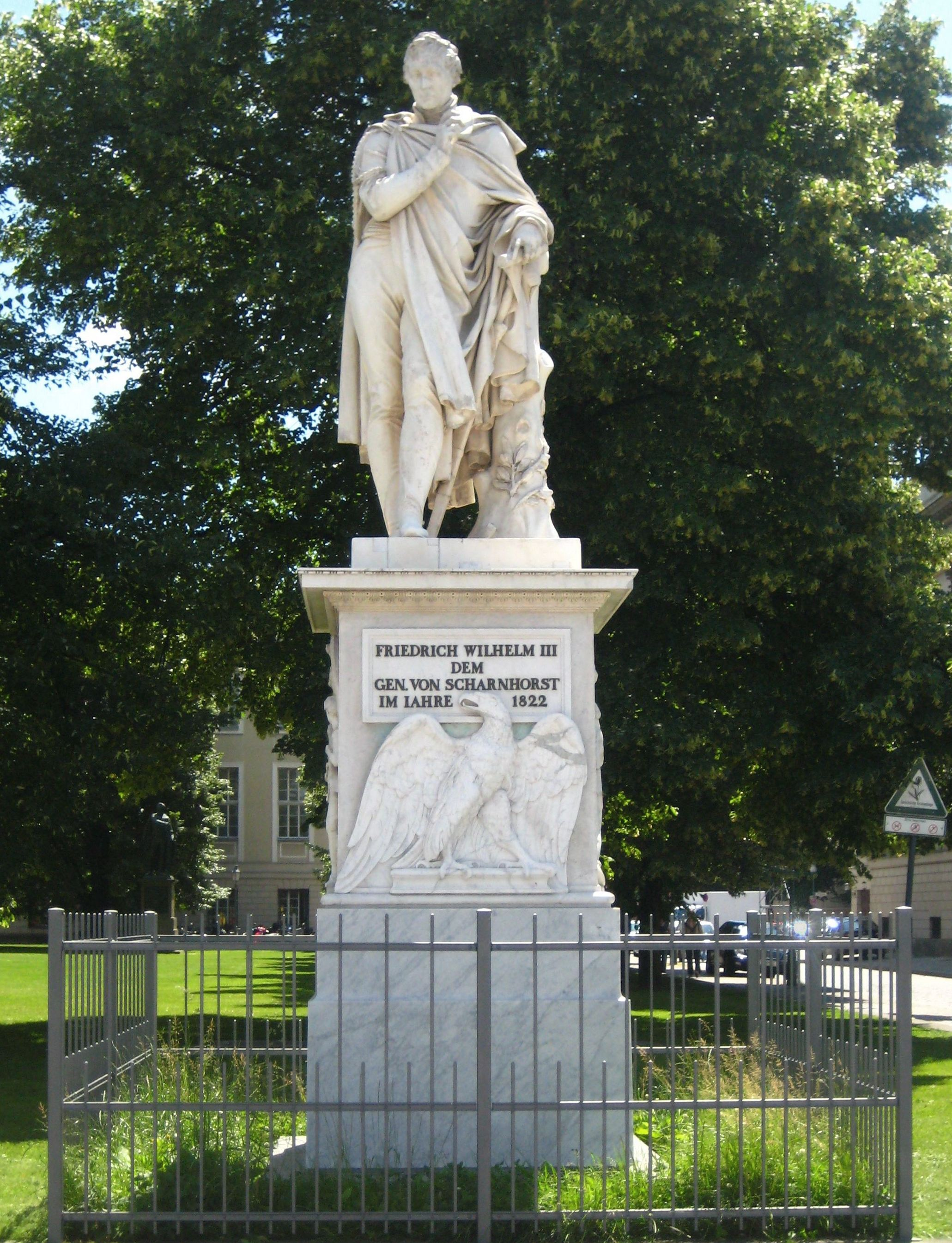
- Artist: Christian Daniel Rauch
- Year: 1822
- Medium: Marble
- Dimensions: 5.73 m (18.8 ft)
- Location: Unter den Linden, Berlin, Germany

The Scharnhorst Memorial on Unter den Linden avenue in Berlin's Mitte district commemorates the Prussian military reformer and freedom fighter Gerhard von Scharnhorst (1755–1813). Created from 1819 to 1822 by Christian Daniel Rauch in neoclassical style, it is a masterpiece of the Berlin school of sculpture.

Until 1951 the memorial stood to the right of the Neue Wache, with which it formed an urban ensemble, and since 1963 it has stood opposite it. The marble statue was removed in 2021 due to weathering and will be replaced by a replica. In this context the re-erection at the original location is being discussed.

== Gallery ==
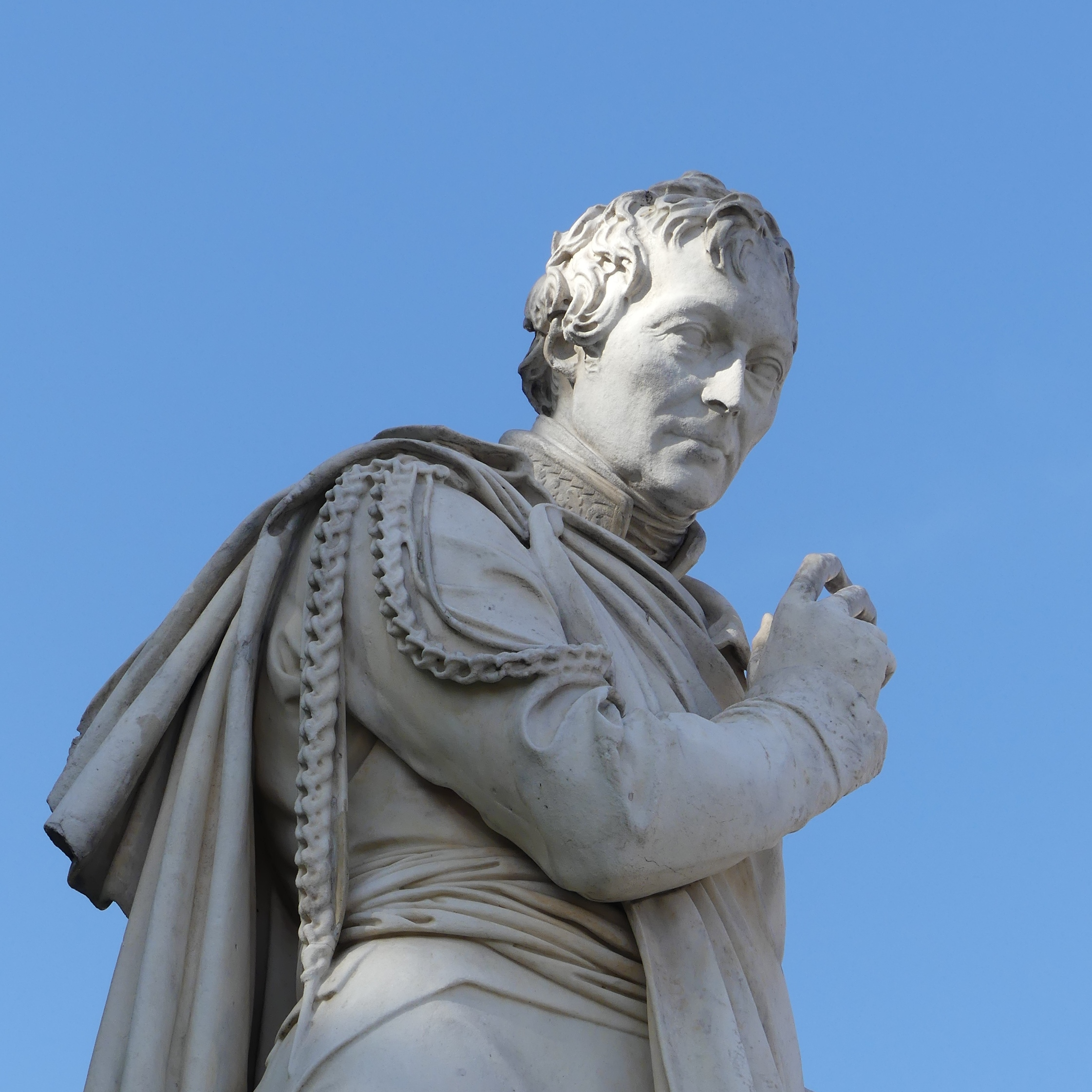
Scharnhorst statue

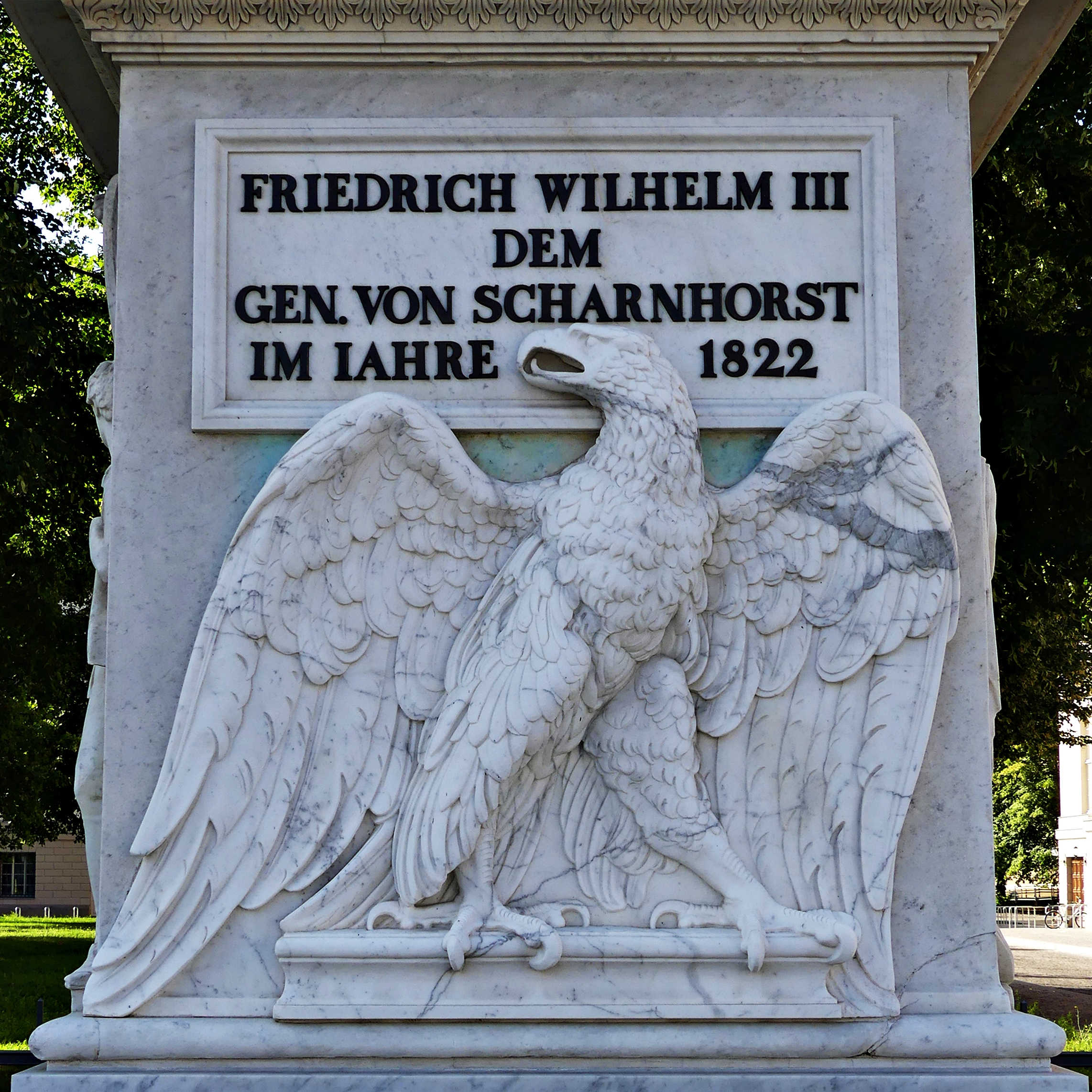
Front relief

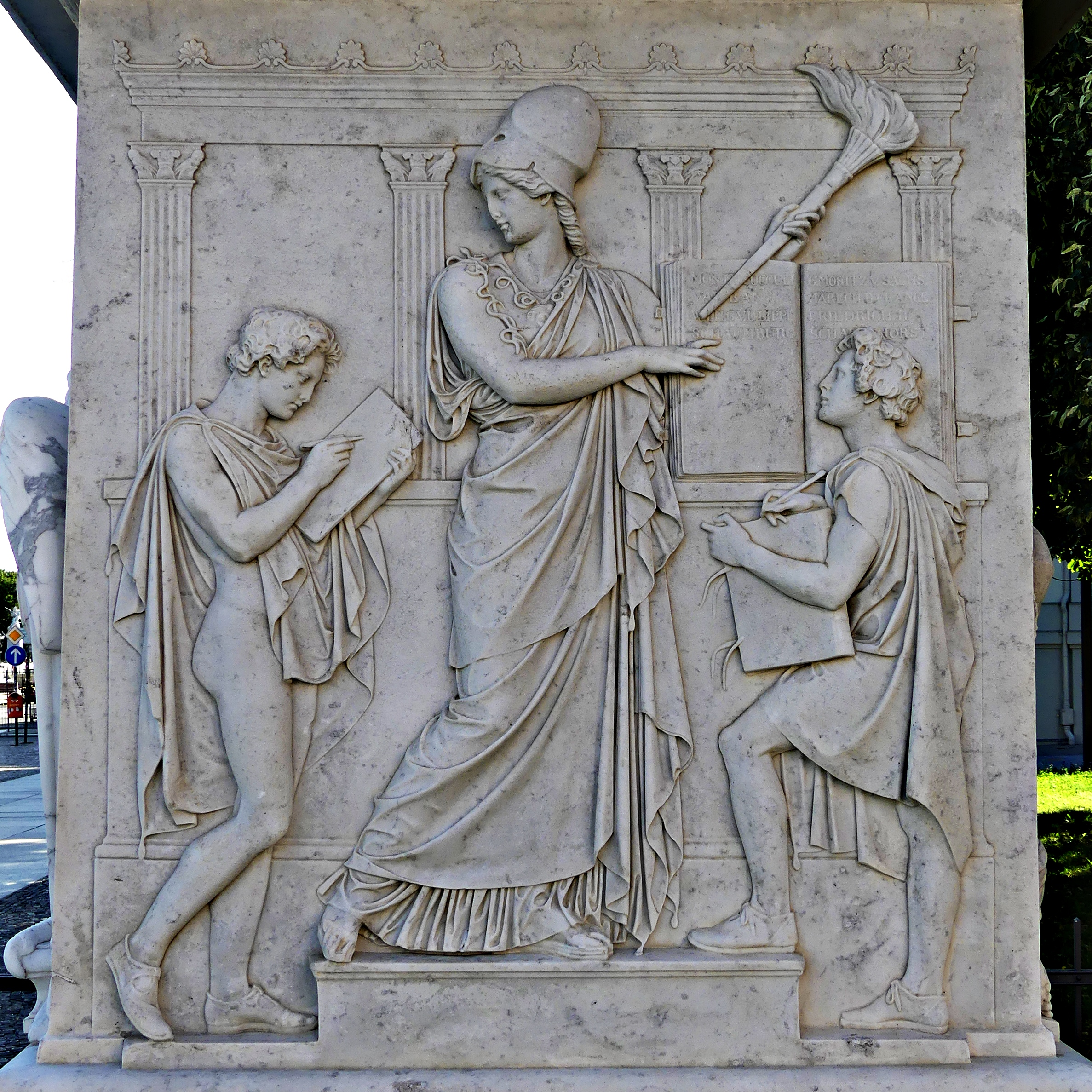
Right relief

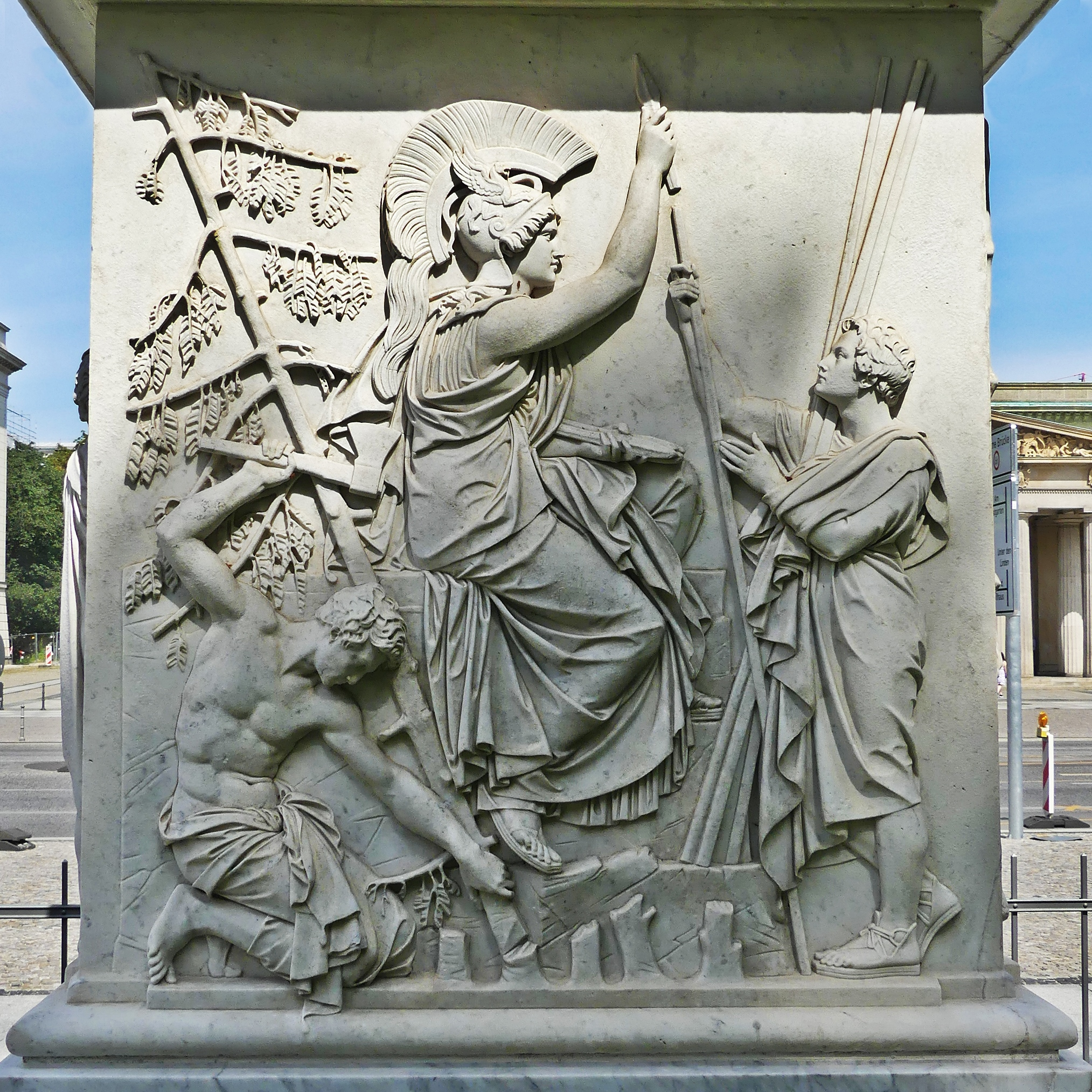
Back relief

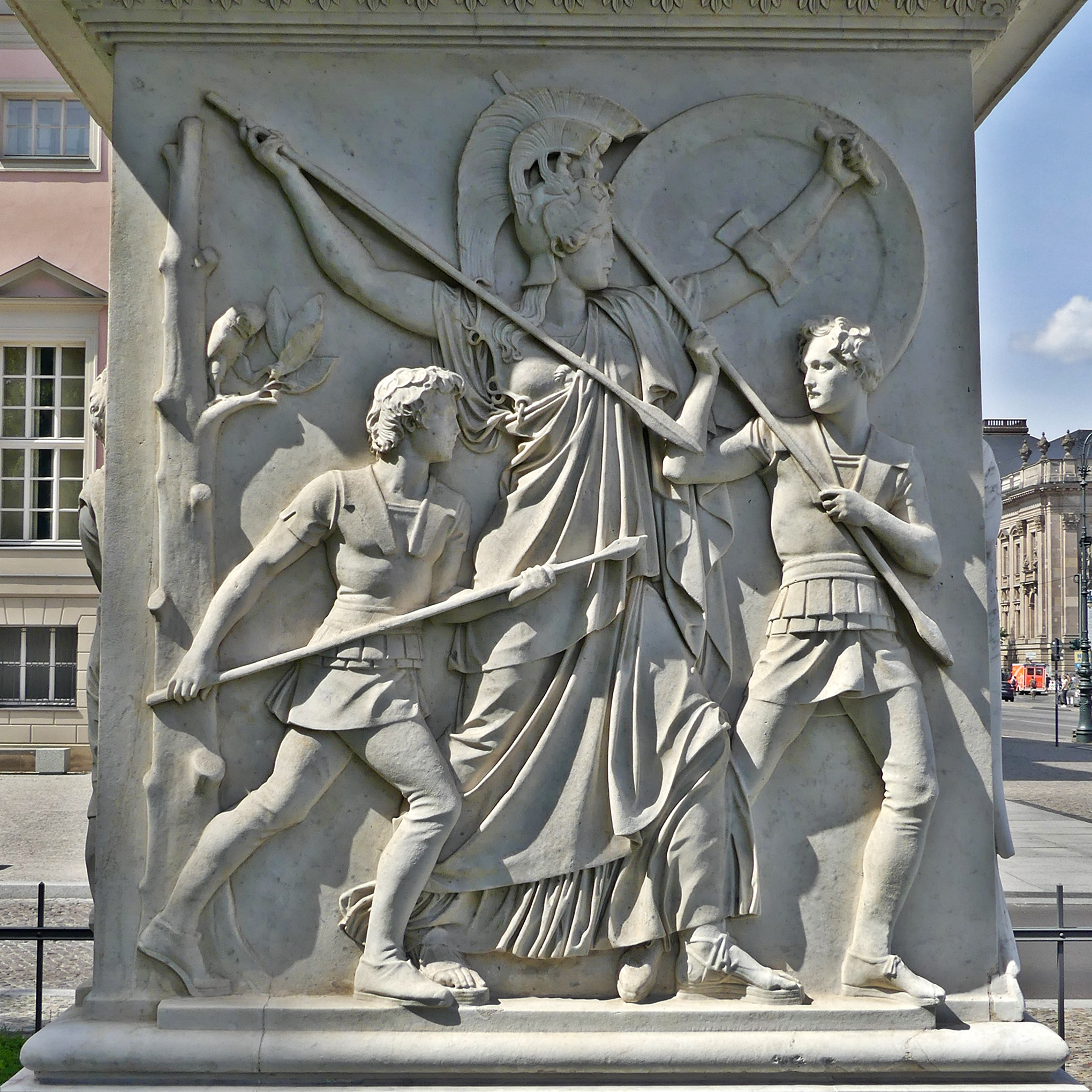
Left relief

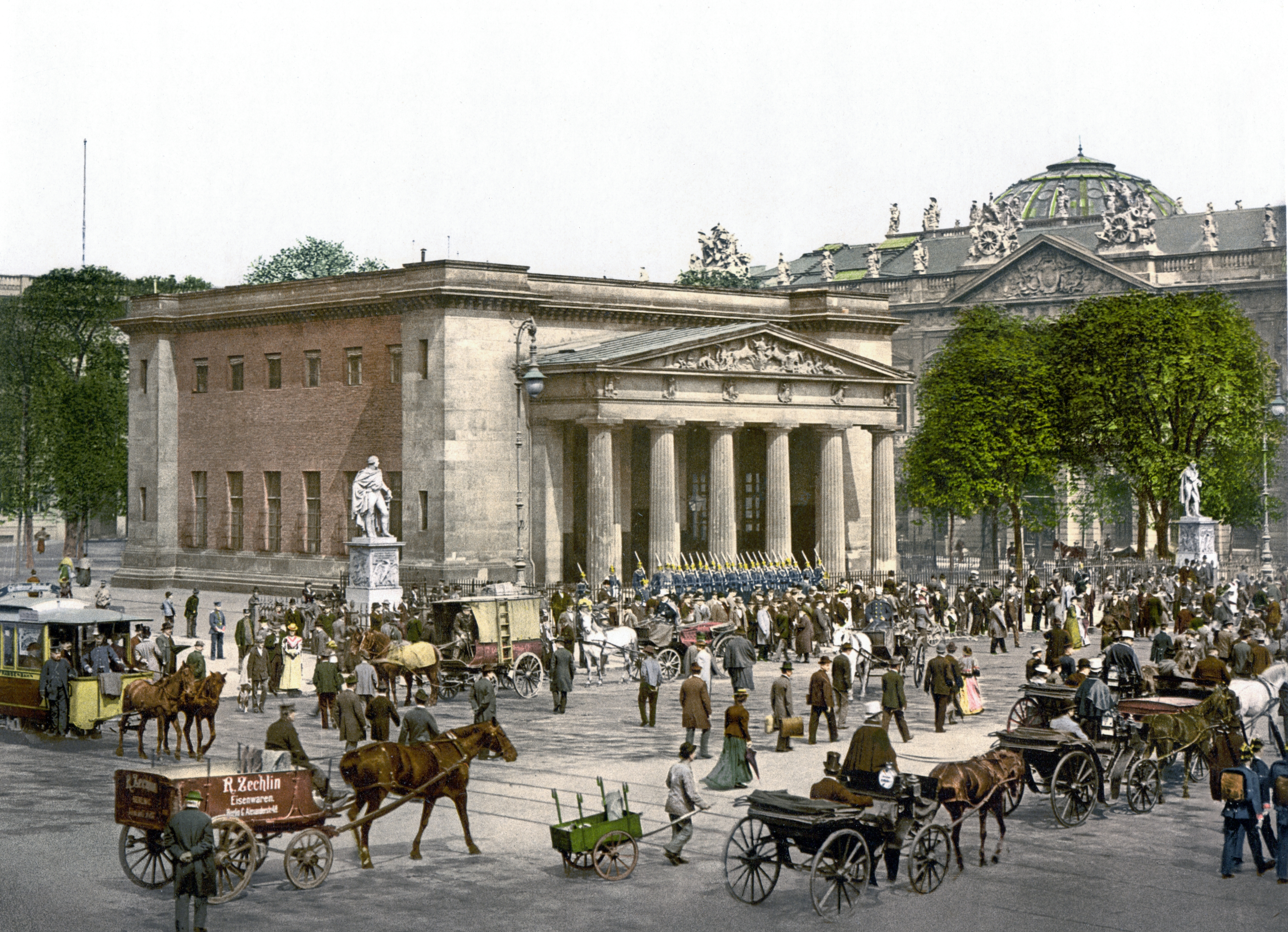
Original location at Neue Wache

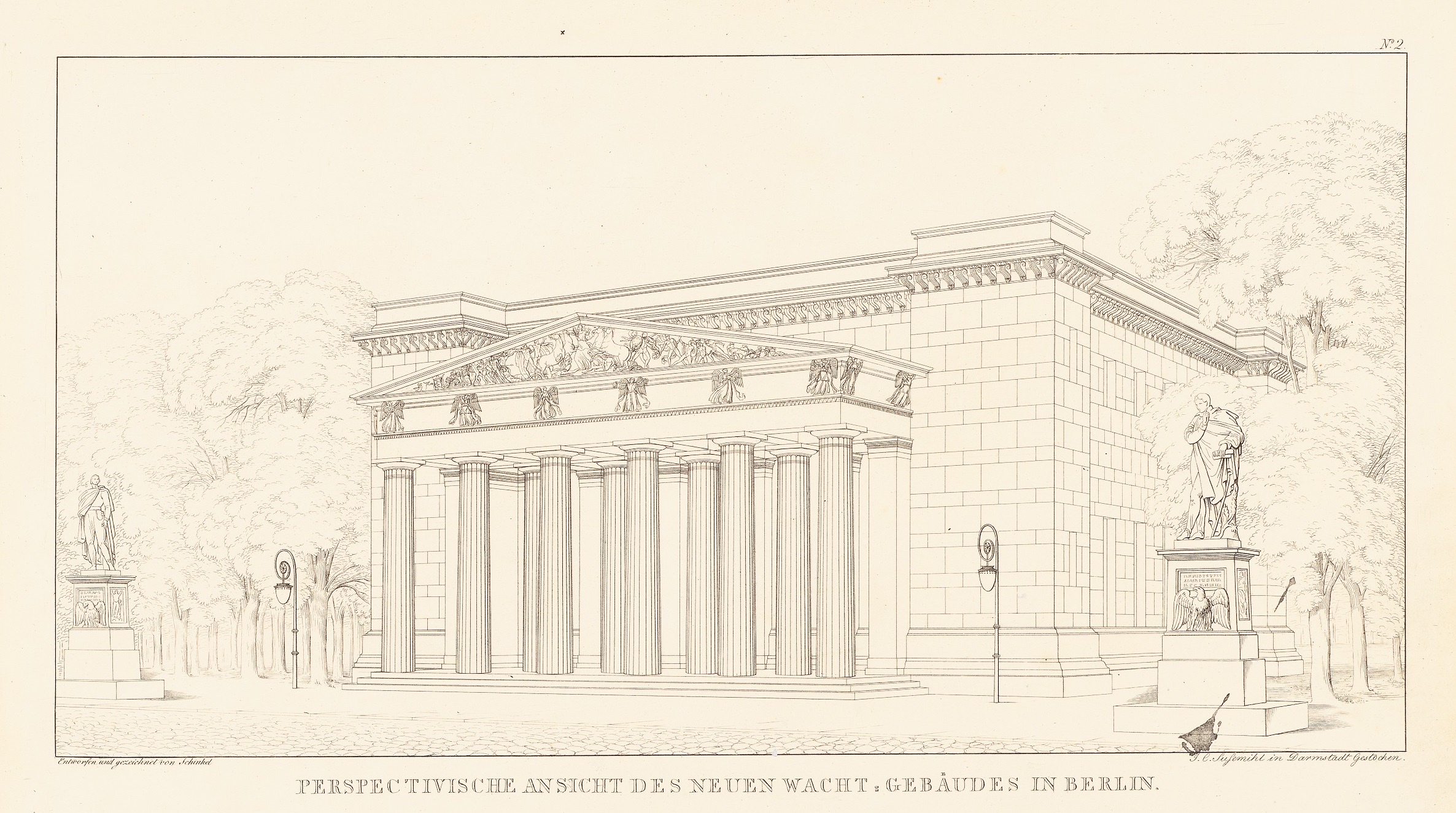
Drawing by Karl Friedrich Schinkel

Painting by Franz Krüger

== See also ==
- Bülow Memorial, Berlin
