= Statue of Hermann von Helmholtz =

Statue in Berlin, Germany

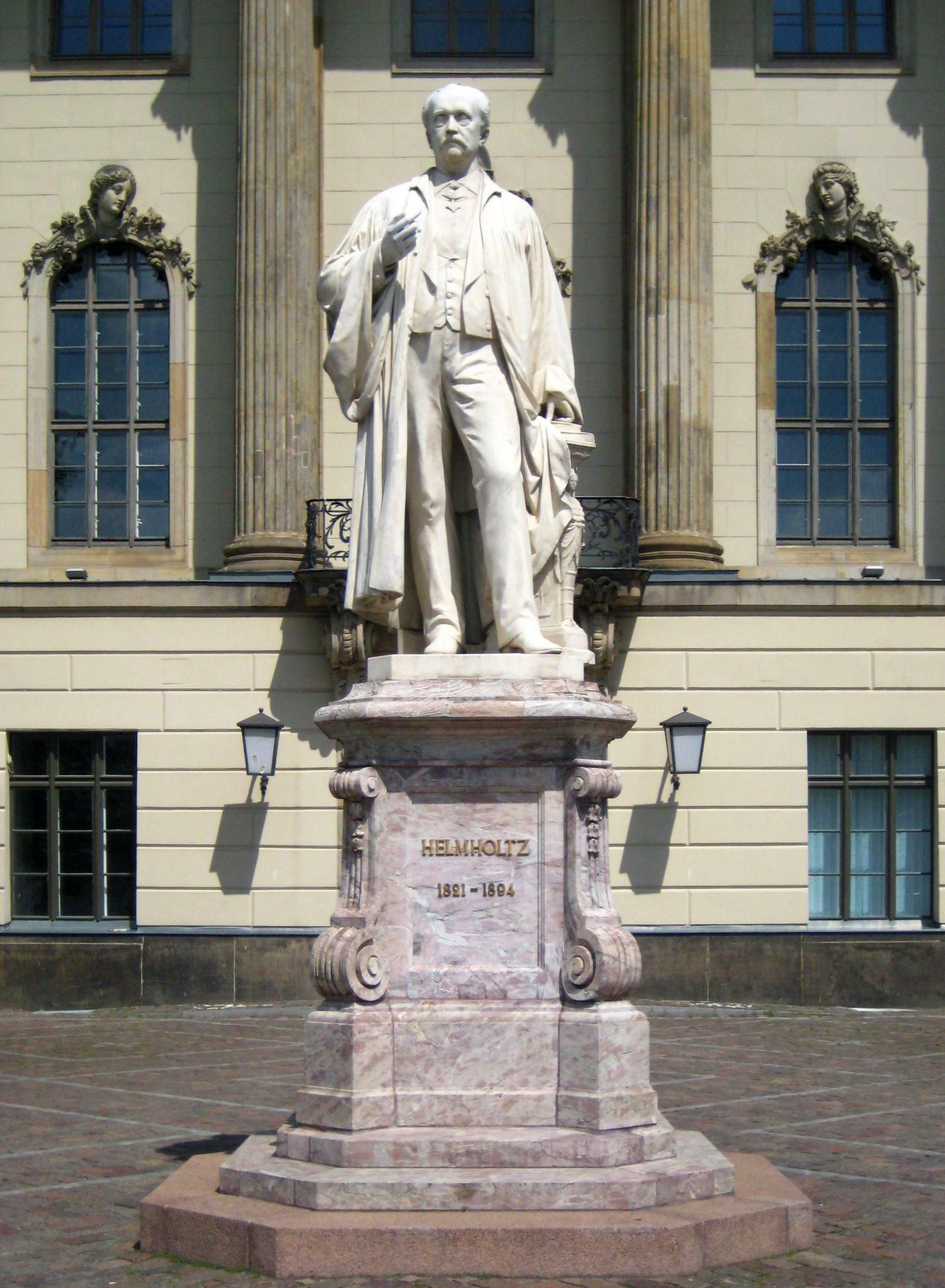
- The statue in 2009
- Artist: Ernst Herter
- Subject: Hermann von Helmholtz
- Location: Berlin, Germany; 52°31′04″N 13°23′37″E

The statue of Hermann von Helmholtz by Ernst Herter is located at Humboldt University of Berlin in Berlin-Mitte, Germany.
