= Amazone zu Pferde (Kiss) =

Sculpture by August Kiss in Altes Museum, Berlin, Germany

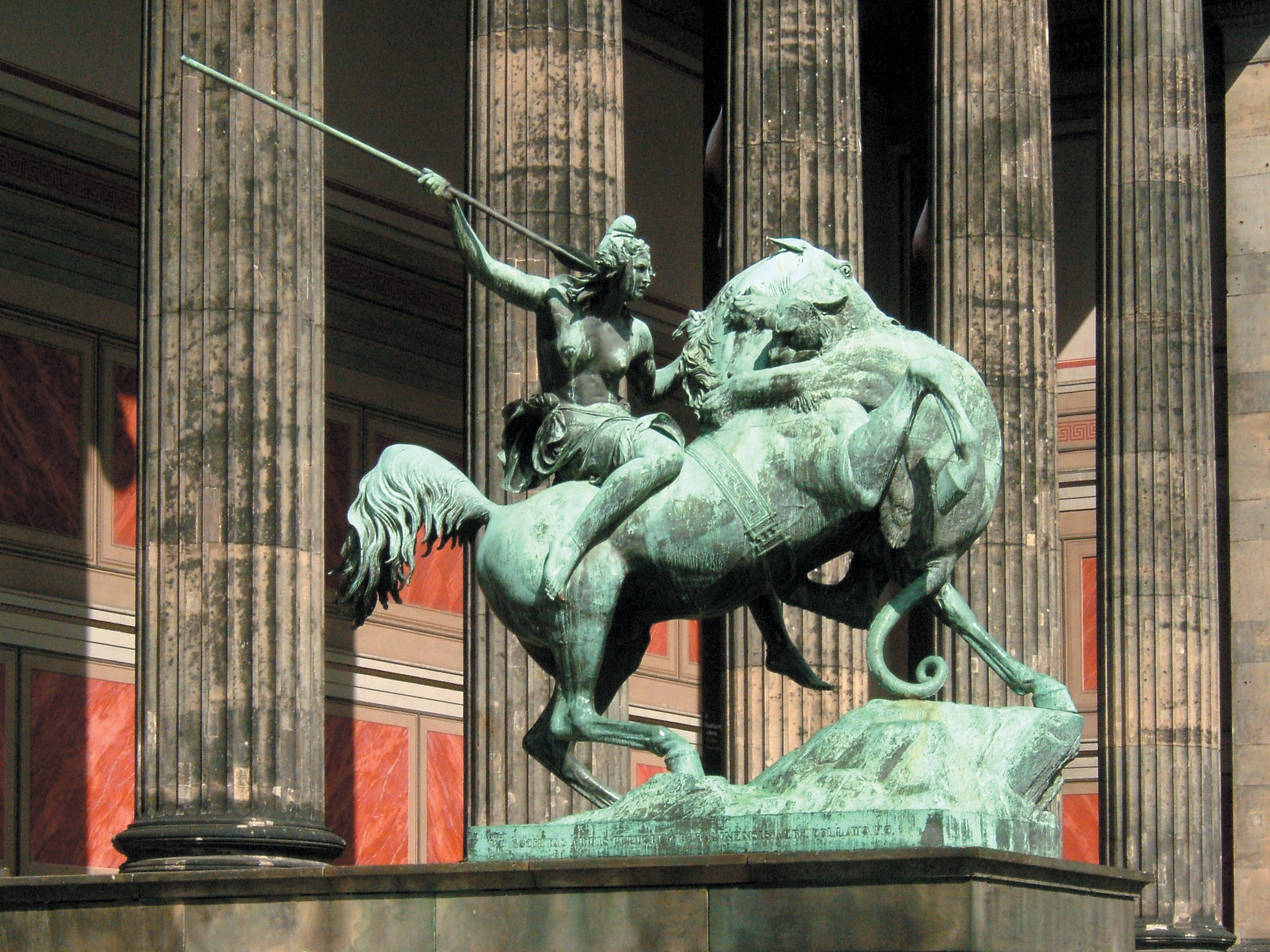
- The sculpture in 2005
- Artist: August Kiss
- Year: 1841
- Location: Berlin, Germany
- 52°31′10″N 13°23′56″E

Amazone zu Pferde is an 1841 bronze equestrian statue by August Kiss, installed outside the Altes Museum in Berlin, Germany. It was based on a smaller clay model which August Kiss first built in 1839. Amazone zu Pferde stands opposite its companion statue, Löwenkämpfer.

A bronze copy, cast in 1929, sits in front of the Philadelphia Museum of Art. Zinc copies also exist in England, Italy, and elsewhere in Germany.

== See also ==
- 1841 in art
