= Statue of Friedrich Wilhelm von Seydlitz =

Statue in Berlin, Germany

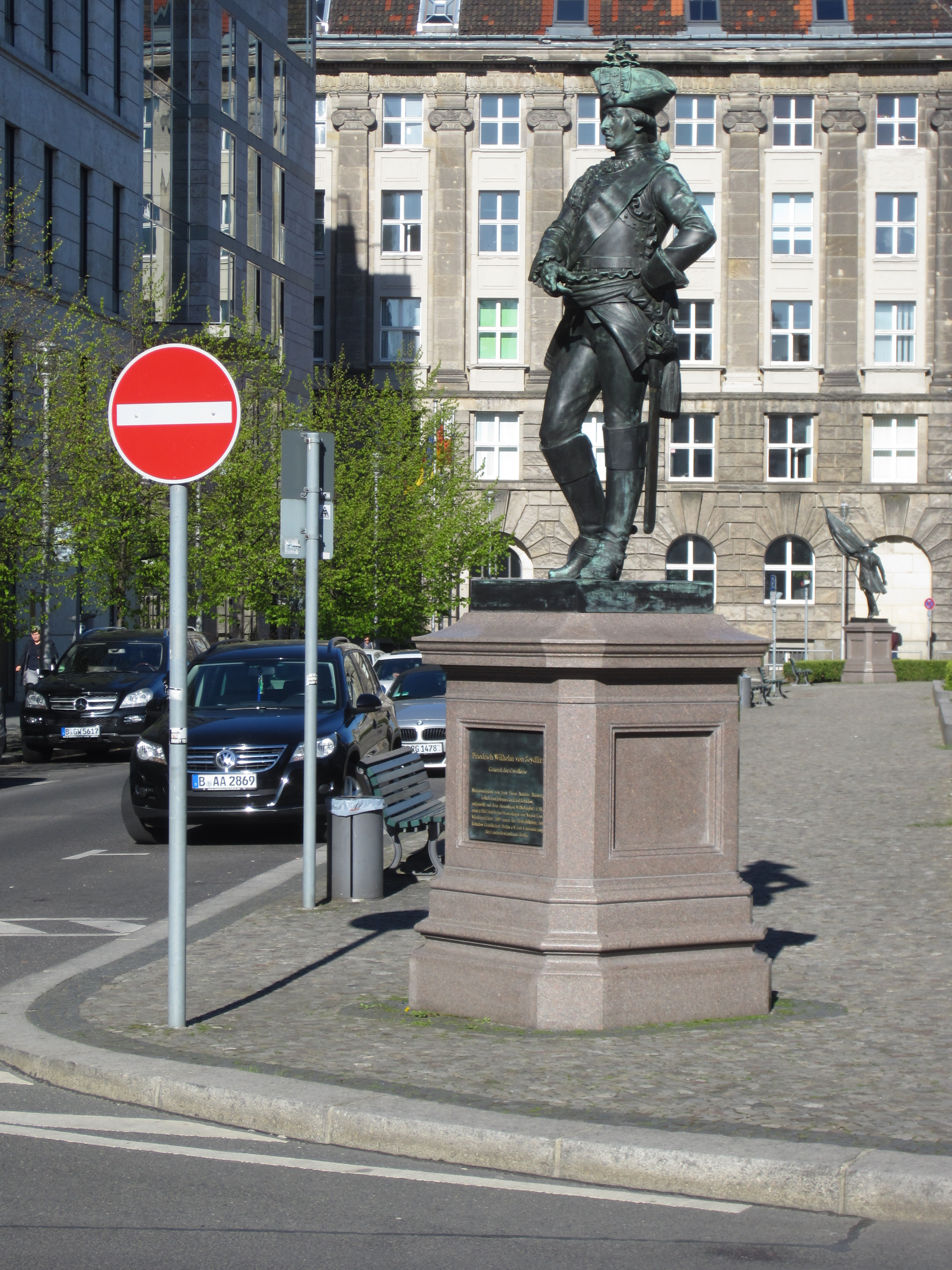
- The sculpture in 2016
- Subject: Friedrich Wilhelm von Seydlitz
- Location: Berlin, Germany

The statue of Friedrich Wilhelm von Seydlitz is a bronze sculpture installed at Zietenplatz in Berlin, Germany.
