= Friedrich Eduard Meyerheim =

German painter (1808-1879)

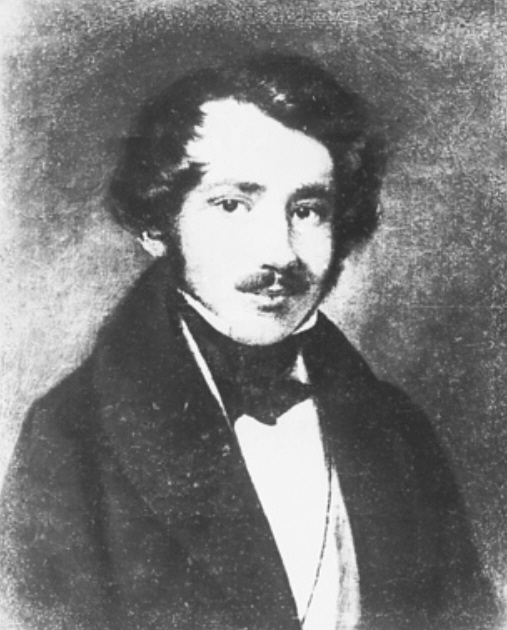
Friedrich Eduard Meyerheim by Franz Krüger

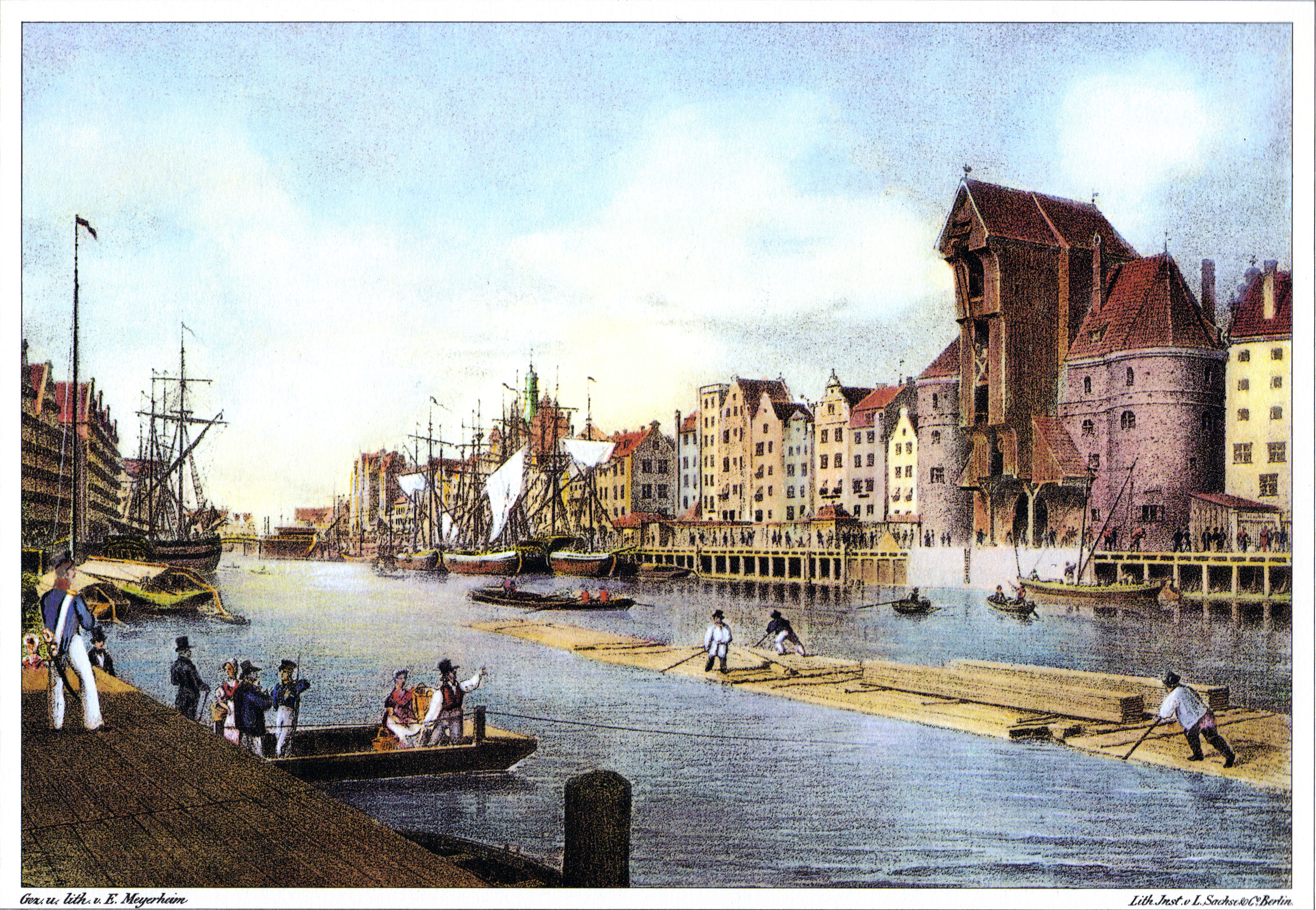
Lange Brücke (Danzig)

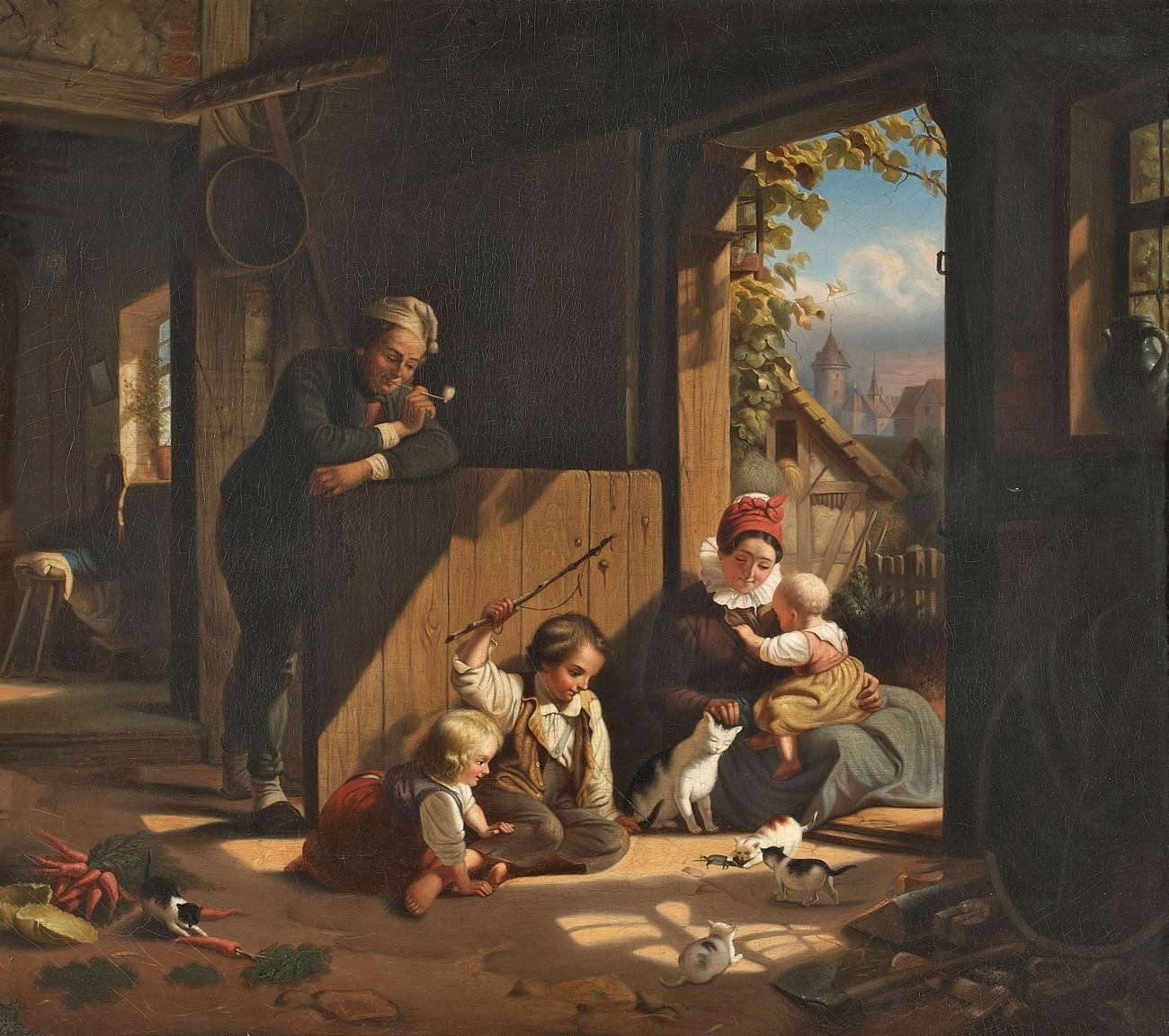
Domestic Happiness

Friedrich Eduard Meyerheim (7 January 1808, Danzig – 18 January 1879, Berlin) was a German painter.

== Biography ==
Meyerheim came from a family of artists with a long history in Danzig (now Gdańsk, Poland). He received his first training from his father, Karl Friedrich Meyerheim (1780-1837), a decorative painter. After further studies with the architect and painter Johann Adam Breysig, he went to Berlin in 1830 and enrolled at the Prussian Academy of Art. His teachers there were Eduard Daege and Johann Gottfried Niedlich.

After graduating, he wandered about with his friend, the future Prussian court architect Heinrich Strack, and produced numerous architectural drawings, primarily of churches and older Backsteingotik brick buildings. His first original work, the Schützenfest westfälischer Bauern (Westphalian Peasants Hunting Party) was painted in 1836 and bought by Joachim Heinrich Wilhelm Wagener, the Swedish-Norwegian Consul, from whose estate it entered the National Gallery (Berlin).

Under the influence of the Düsseldorf school of painting, he spent the years 1833-1841 producing works in the Romantic genre style. After that, he devoted himself exclusively to portrayals of bourgeois and peasant life, focusing on Westphalia, Thuringia, and Hesse. His work is characterized by enamel-like coloring. By 1855, he was a Regius Professor and a member of the Academies in Berlin, Dresden and Munich.

In 1836, he married Karoline Drake, the sister of sculptor Friedrich Drake. In 1870, he was afflicted by a debilitating nervous disorder that periodically prevented him from painting and eventually led to his death.

== Other painters in the Meyerheim family ==
His brother, Wilhelm Alexander Meyerheim (1815–1882), specialized in genre paintings, pictures of horses and military subjects. Another brother, Hermann Meyerheim (fl.1860s), painted architecture and maritime scenes. His sons, Franz Eduard Meyerheim and Paul Friedrich Meyerheim, were his students.
