= Johann Adam Breysig =

German architect, painter and art teacher

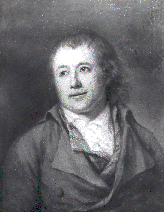
Johann Adam Breysig (artist unknown)

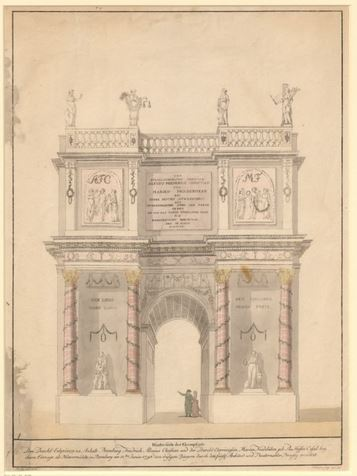
"Honor Gate" for the Wedding of Prince Alexius Frederick Christian and Princess Marie, House of Anhalt-Bernburg

Johann Adam Breysig (1 April 1766 – 29 August 1831) was a German architect, painter and art teacher.

== Life and work ==
He was born in Leutesdorf. His father was a wine grower. He was initially trained by the theatre painter, Peter Beckenkamp (fl.1780–1800), in Koblenz, then travelled with a theatrical troupe, designing their stage sets. In 1791, he settled down as a master builder and theater painter in Bernburg then, in 1796, became the Building Commissioner for the princes of Anhalt-Bernburg in Ballenstedt. Three years later, King Frederick William III of Prussia appointed him as one of the first Professors at the recently established Kunstgewerbe- und Handwerkerschule Magdeburg.

After 1804, he helped establish the Provincial Art Academy in Danzig; serving as its Director from 1809 until his death in 1831 in Danzig. His notable students included his nephew, Johann Baptista Breysig (1786–1856), August Lobegott Randt (1794–1859), Michael Carl Gregorovius and Johann Karl Schultz. In addition to teaching, he arranged exhibitions and organized the art collection belonging to the wealthy merchant, Jacob Kabrun. He also did some restorative and conservational work.

=== Panoramas ===
Although the Irishman, Robert Barker, is generally considered to be the inventor of the modern panoramic painting, Breysig claimed, in a 1799 pamphlet, that he had come up with the idea one year before Barker took out his patent in 1787. He may have made the claim simply for publicity, as he was looking for someone to finance a panorama he had been planning; a search that was eventually successful. His subject was Rome, based on sketches he had made during a visit there in 1792. He was assisted by Karl Ludwig Kaaz and Franz Karl Tielker (1765–1845).

Later, Johann Carl Enslen and his son, Karl Georg Enslen, who had studied with Breysig, introduced panoramas on a large scale at annual fairs in Germany, and helped to popularize them throughout Europe.

== Selected writings ==
- Versuch einer Erläuterung der Reliefsperspektive, zugleich für Mahler eingerichtet. 1798
- Symbolik durch Kränze und Kronen: Ueberbleibsel des in Königsberg als Manuscript mit dem neuen Schauspielhause verbrannten Wörterbuches der Bilder Sprache; aus einer Künstler-Mappe; nützlich und unterhaltend für Jedermann, unentbehrlich für bildende Künstler; herausgegeben bei der Gelegenheit der Eröffnung der Danziger Kunst- und Handwerks-Schule. Danzig: Weiß 1809
- Wörterbuch der Bildersprache oder kurzgefaßte und belehrende Angaben symbolischer und allegorischer Bilder und oft damit vermischter konventioneller Zeichen. Zugleich Versuch eines Zierathenwörterbuches. Mit 3119 lithographierten Monogrammen auf 54 Seiten und einer Charte. Leipzig: Vogel 1830 (Online), Bayerische Staatsbibliothek

== Sources ==
- Theodor Hirsch (1876). "Breysig, Adam" . Allgemeine Deutsche Biographie (in German). Vol. 3. Leipzig: Duncker & Humblot. p. 326.
- Ingeborg Krengel-Strudthoff, Bärbel Rudin (Eds.): In blauer Ferne: von der Kulissenbühne zum Königsberger panoramischen Theater: Schriften zur Bühnenreform von Johann Adam Breysig (1766–1831). (Studien der Forschungsstelle Ostmitteleuropa an der Universität Dortmund 12, ISSN 0179-6356) Wiesbaden: Harrassowitz 1993 ISBN 9783447033862
- Biography @ Projekt Straty
