= Wilhelm Wandschneider =

German sculptor

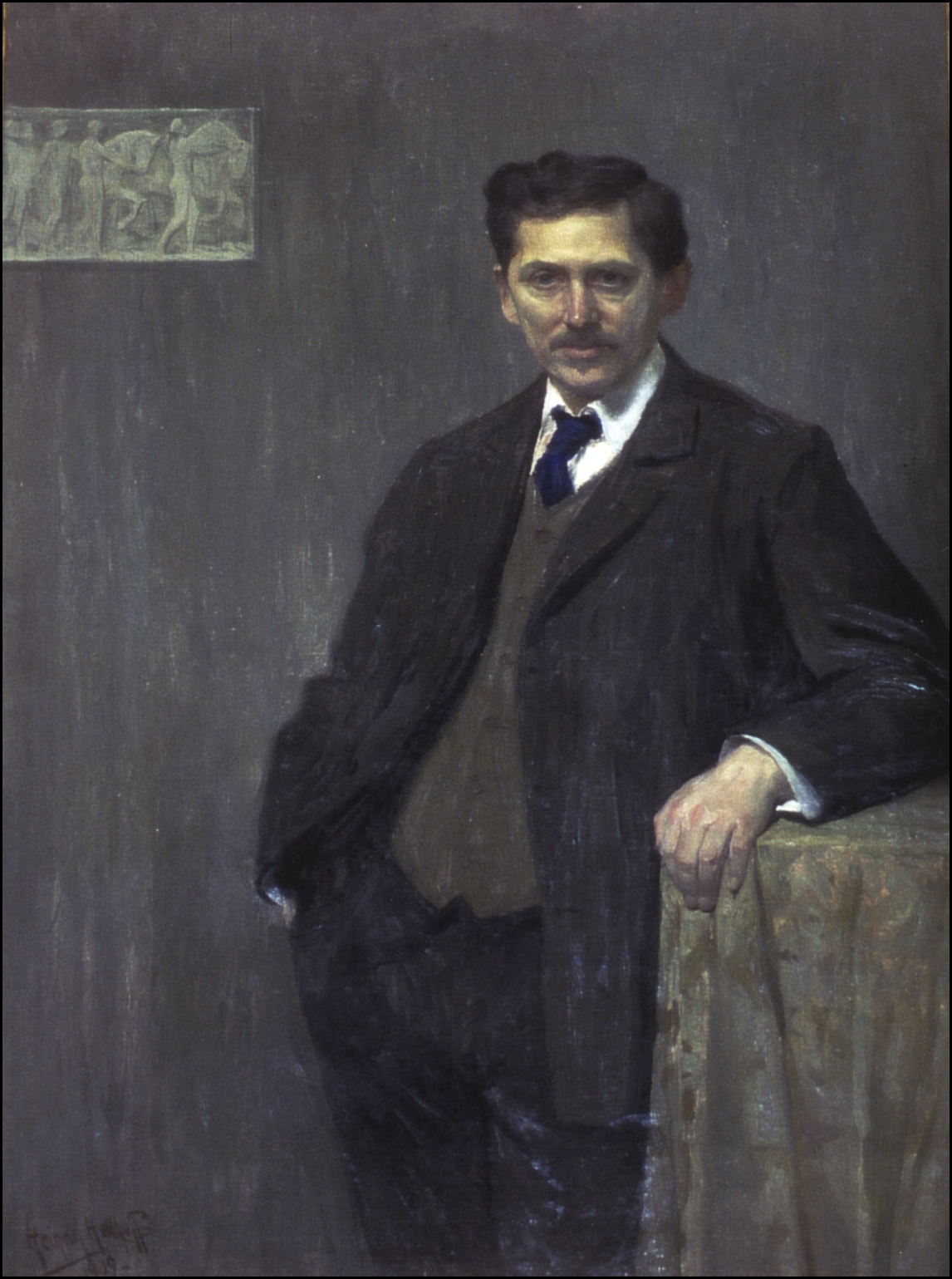
Wilhelm Wandschneider, portrait by Heinrich Hellhoff

Wilhelm Georg Johannes Wandschneider (6 June 1866, Plau am See – 23 September 1942, Plau am See) was a German sculptor.

== Life ==
His father was a commercial decorative painter. At an early age, he began an after-school apprenticeship in the family workshop, taking advantage of a few free hours for more artistic endeavors. In 1885, after having served as an assistant on a trip to Rostock and Güstrow, his father gave him permission to go to Berlin and look for work.

The Mayor of Plau had seen some of Wandschneider's artistic work and was impressed, so he attempted to arrange a scholarship. After securing recommendations from Ludwig Brunow and Martin Wolff the Mayor sent a letter to Grand Duke Frederick Francis III, who granted Wandschneider a personal gift of 150 Marks to study at the Prussian Academy of Art. After passing the entrance exam in 1886, he studied with Albert Wolff, Paul Friedrich Meyerheim, Fritz Schaper and Gerhard Janensch. He also gained practical experience working in the studios of Ludwig Brunow, Martin Wolff, Karl Hilgers and Ernst Herter. In 1895, he became a Master Student of Reinhold Begas but did not remain long, having won a prize from the "Philip von Rohr Foundation" which enabled him to study in Italy for a year. While there, he met his future wife, Anna Kreß, who was working as a model.

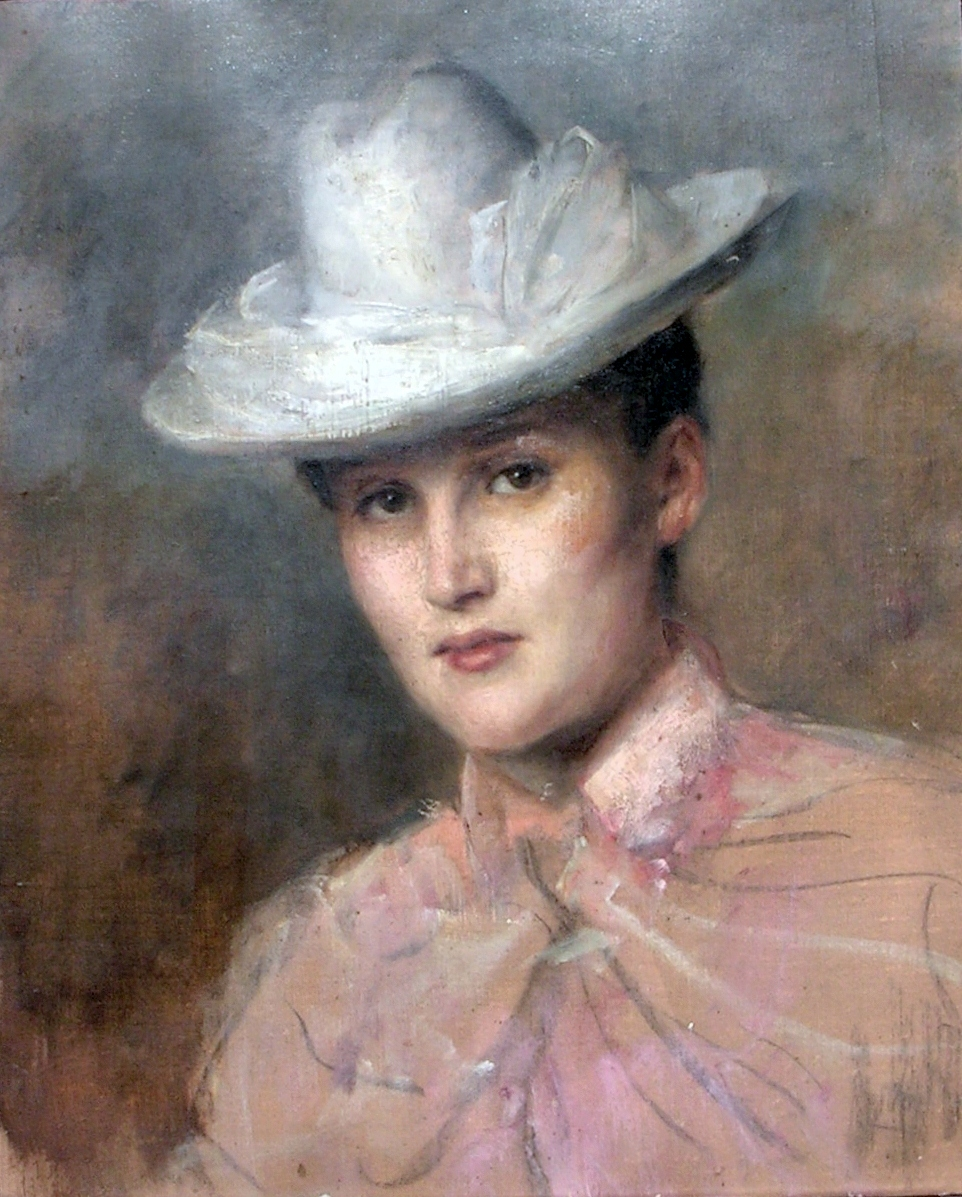
Anna Wandschneider (c.1910), by Fritz Greve

=== Career in Berlin ===
Full of confidence upon his return to Berlin, he was determined to achieve success as a free-lance sculptor, participating in several contests for monument and fountain designs. By 1898, he had won three major commissions. In 1899, through his friend Constantin Starck, he met Duke John Albert of Mecklenburg, who liked his work and placed several orders. His career truly took off after that point and the years 1897 to 1916 proved to be his most successful. Buoyed by the positive reception he received at the St.Louis World's Fair in 1904, he entered competitions for monuments in places as diverse as Manila, Cape Town and Quito, but to no avail. He finally received an order for a monument to Michael Andreas Barclay de Tolly in Riga and was proffered an invitation to compete for a monument in St.Louis that would be dedicated to the German-American journalists Carl Schurz, Emil Preetorius and Carl Daenzer.

=== Travel to America ===
The competition was primarily sponsored by Anheuser-Busch cofounder Adolphus Busch, who had contributed $20,000 of the $31,000 needed to construct the monument. Wandschneider's entry, a single nude female statue, called "The Naked Truth", was selected as the winner by the jury, which subsequently invited him to St. Louis to collect his winnings.

Unfortunately, the Memorial Association, as well as Busch himself, were not pleased with the selection of a nude as the winner. Local residents were also upset, and sent the Association over 250 letters of complaint. Yielding to pressure, the Association cabled him, to inform him that they were rescinding the award, so he should stay in Germany. He reportedly received the cable shortly before leaving, but decided to go anyway. Upon his arrival in St.Louis, he met with the design committee and argued for the appropriateness of his design. His personal appeals were effective, and a compromise was reached; the statue would be made of bronze, rather than white marble, to deemphasize its nudity.

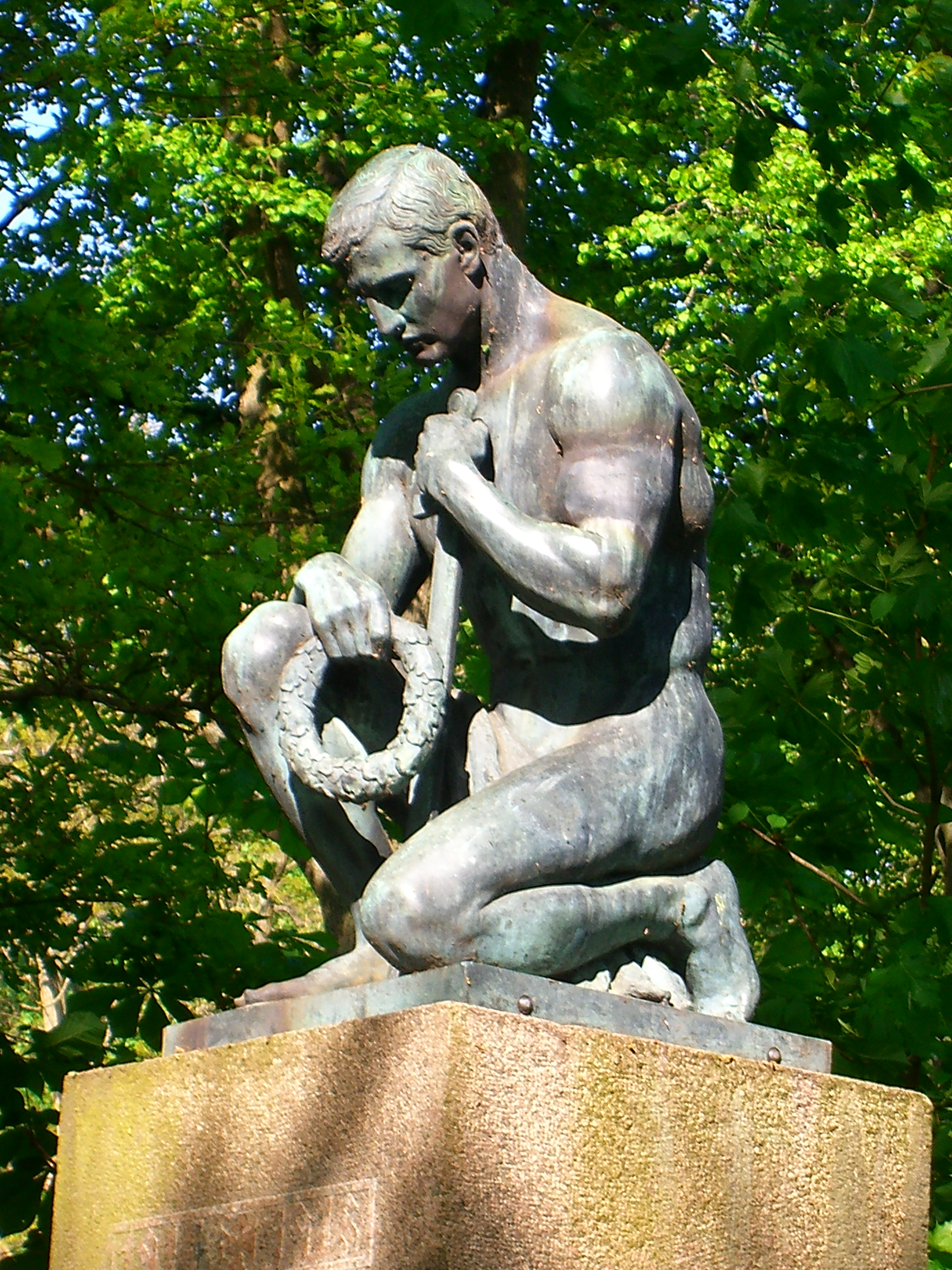
"The Kneeling Soldier", a figure that may be seen at several war memorials throughout Germany. This one is in Crivitz and dates from 1922.

=== Later years ===
After Germany's defeat in World War I, many artists entered a period of financial distress as public commissions and private clients were difficult to find. At times, he had to feed his six children at the local soup kitchen. His only work came from military societies, seeking to memorialize their fallen comrades. In 1925, he had to sell his home and studio in Berlin, returning to his birthplace of Plau to reduce expenses. The people there greeted their famous son enthusiastically, creating a display of his plaster casts in a room at the local schoolhouse. This mini-museum was in operation until 1947. Even though he was politically conservative, he joined the National Socialist party in 1930, perhaps to ensure his employability.

In 1994, the city of Plau established a new museum to house his works, the "Bildhauermuseum Prof. Wandschneider"; on the site of the original classroom. In 2014, the redesigned and enlarged collection was moved to the "Burgmuseum".

== Selected major works ==
A complete list of his works may be found in the corresponding article on German Wikipedia.

=== Monuments ===
- 1898: Neustettin, Statue of Kaiser Wilhelm I. (Melted down in 1943). A heavily damaged portion of the base was recovered from a lake in 2003 and reinstalled.
- 1899: Berlin-Charlottenburg, Statue of Werner von Siemens (The original base was destroyed. The figure was restored in 2003 and reinstalled on the Straße des 17. Juni).
- 1901: Schwerin, Statue of Otto von Bismarck. (Melted down c.1950 by the Communist government. The base was reworked into gravestones. A similar fate befell his statue of Grand Duke Friedrich Franz III in Rostock.
- 1903: Dortmund, Statue of Otto von Bismarck (Removed and hidden in 1940, but discovered in 1960 and melted down.)
- 1913: Riga, Statue of Michael Andreas Barclay de Tolly (Lost in 1915; reconstructed on its original base in 2002)
- 1914: St. Louis, Allegorical figure "The Naked Truth". (see above)
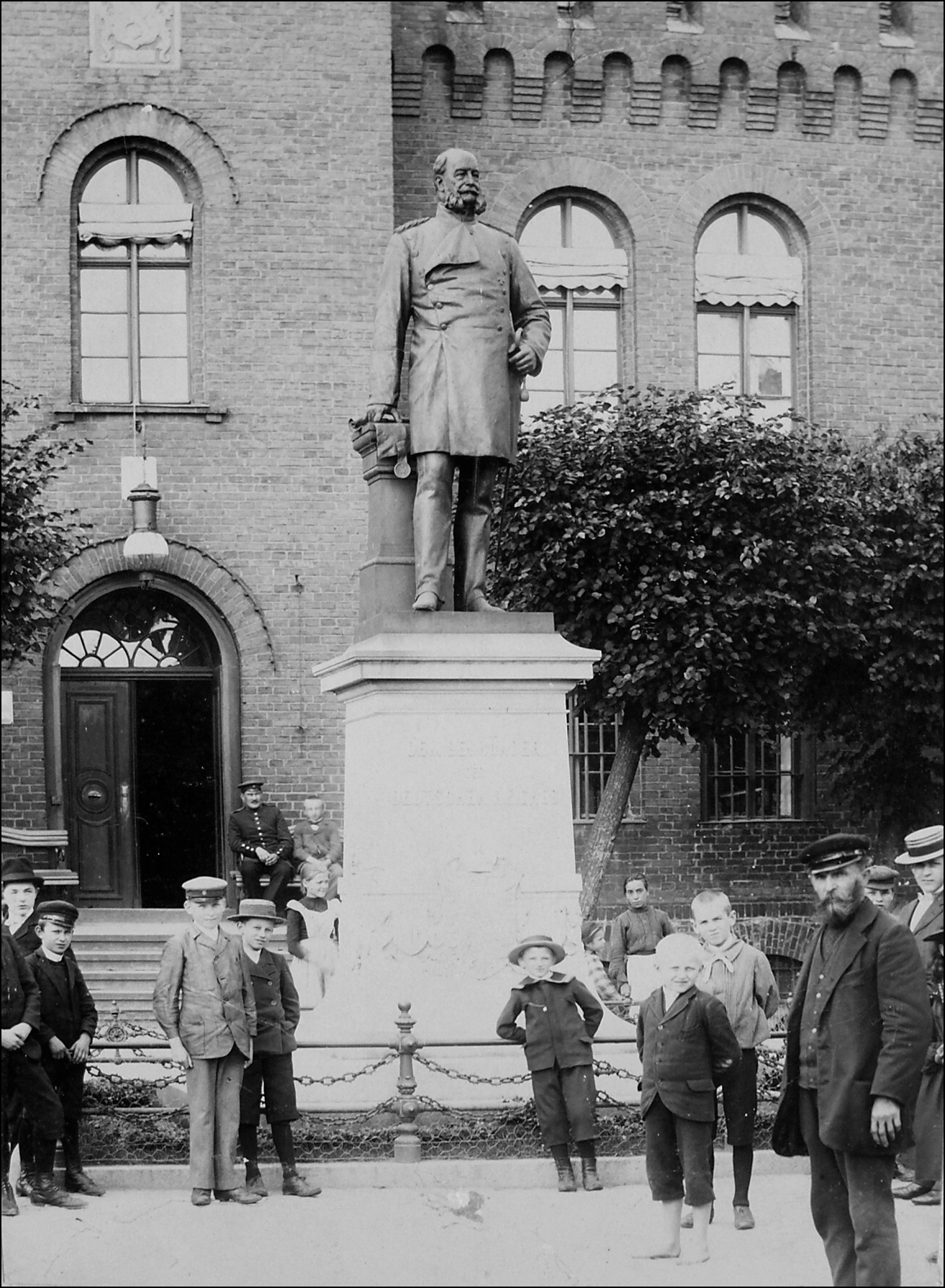
Kaiser Wilhelm I (Neustettin)

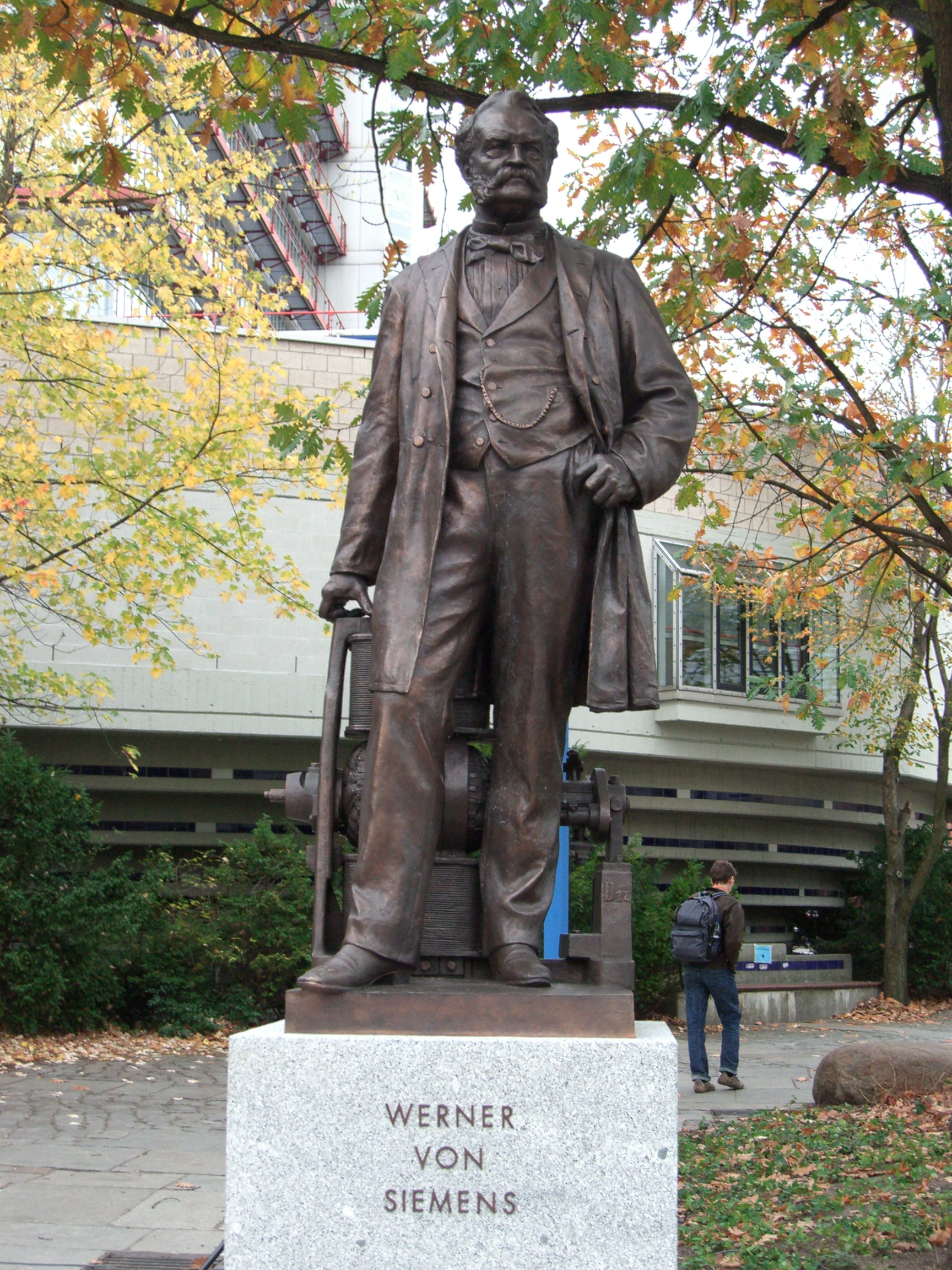
Werner von Siemens

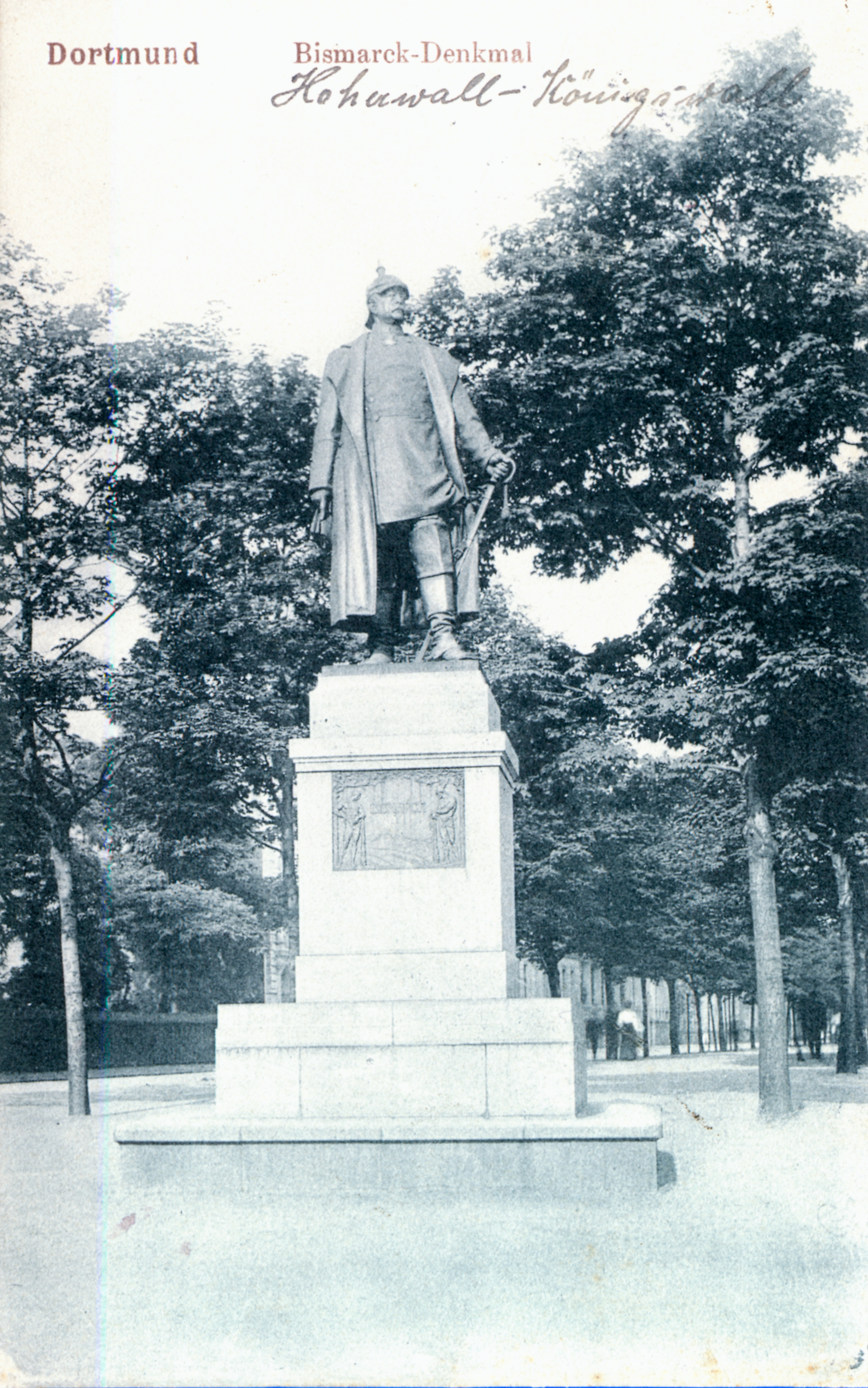
Otto von Bismarck (Dortmund)

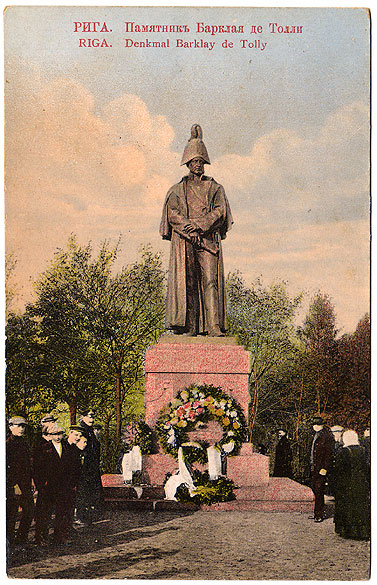
Barclay de Tolly

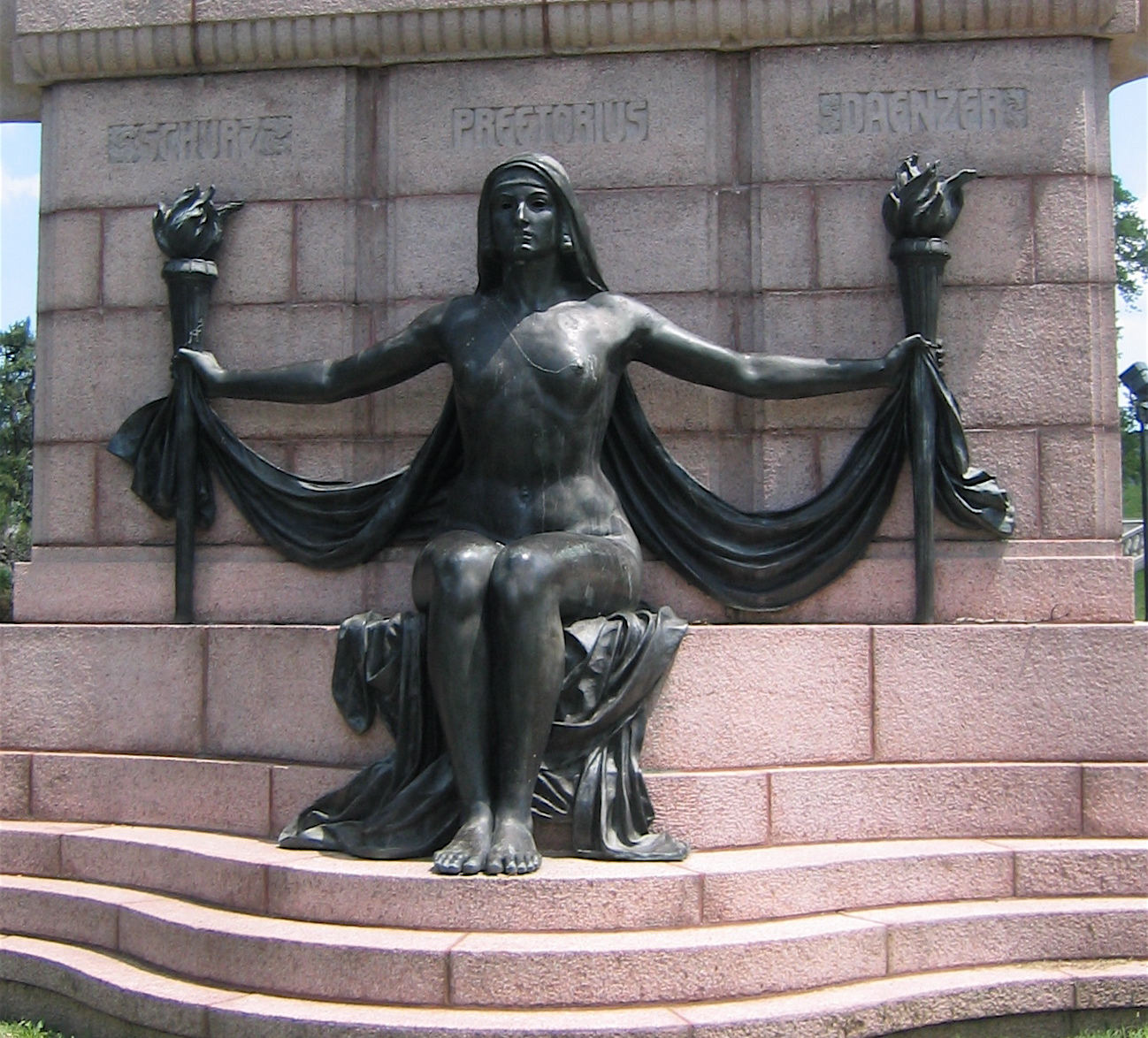
"The Naked Truth"

=== War memorials ===
- 1909: Sömmerda: Two-figure statue in honor of Johann Nikolaus von Dreyse. (Demolished in 1948. Fragments of his head and the base still exist.)
- 1910: Güstrow, Figure of the "Kneeling Soldier", commemorating the Franco-Prussian War. Several more versions of this figure were created for other locations after World War I.
- 1920: Malchow, figure of "The Dying Roman Warrior", with a Swastika on the reverse of the shield. It was dismantled in 1945, with the intention of reinstalling it once the Swastika was removed, but it was melted down in 1956.
- 1936: Rostock, Figure of a fighting sailor to commemorate the Battle of Jutland and the men who were lost on the SMS Rostock. (Dismantled in 1945 and melted at some later date. The base survived until recently, when it was seriously vandalized and had to be removed.)

=== Miscellaneous figures ===
- 1903: Plau am See, Figure of "Coriolanus", originally created for the 1904 St.Louis World's Fair, where it won a gold medal. It has also been reproduced a statuette.
- 1906: "Der Sieger" (The Victor), in the Tiergarten Berlin (Melted in 1942, recast in 2001.)
- 1908: "Voss un Swinegel" (fox and hedgehog), in Güstrow
- 1914: "Hechtbrunnen" (Hake Fountain), in Teterow.
- 1935: "Sämann" (Sower), and "Mähender Bauer" (Mower), in Plau am See.
- 1936: "Pfennigjunge" (Pennyboy), on the former savings bank building, Plau am See
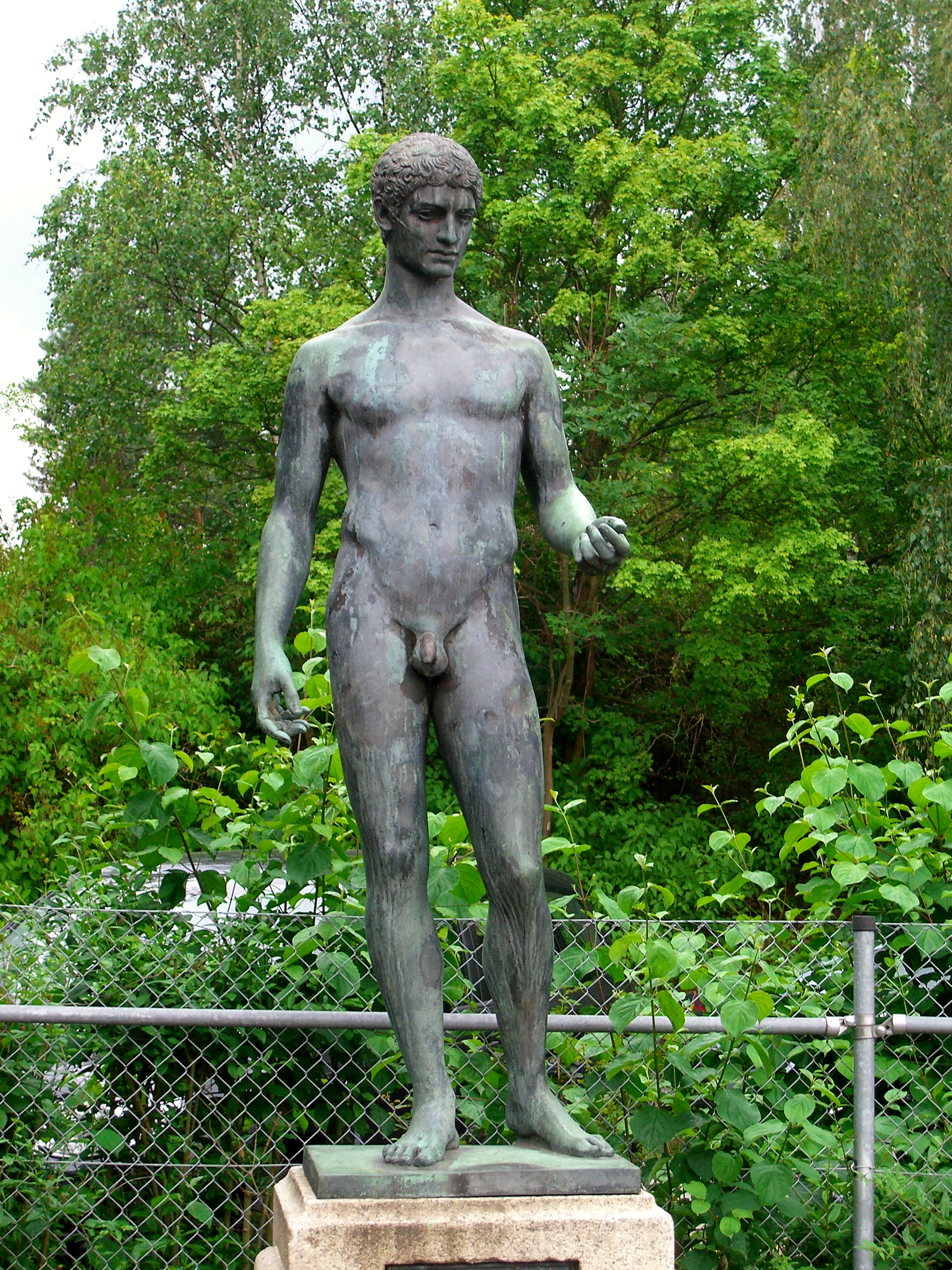
Der Sieger

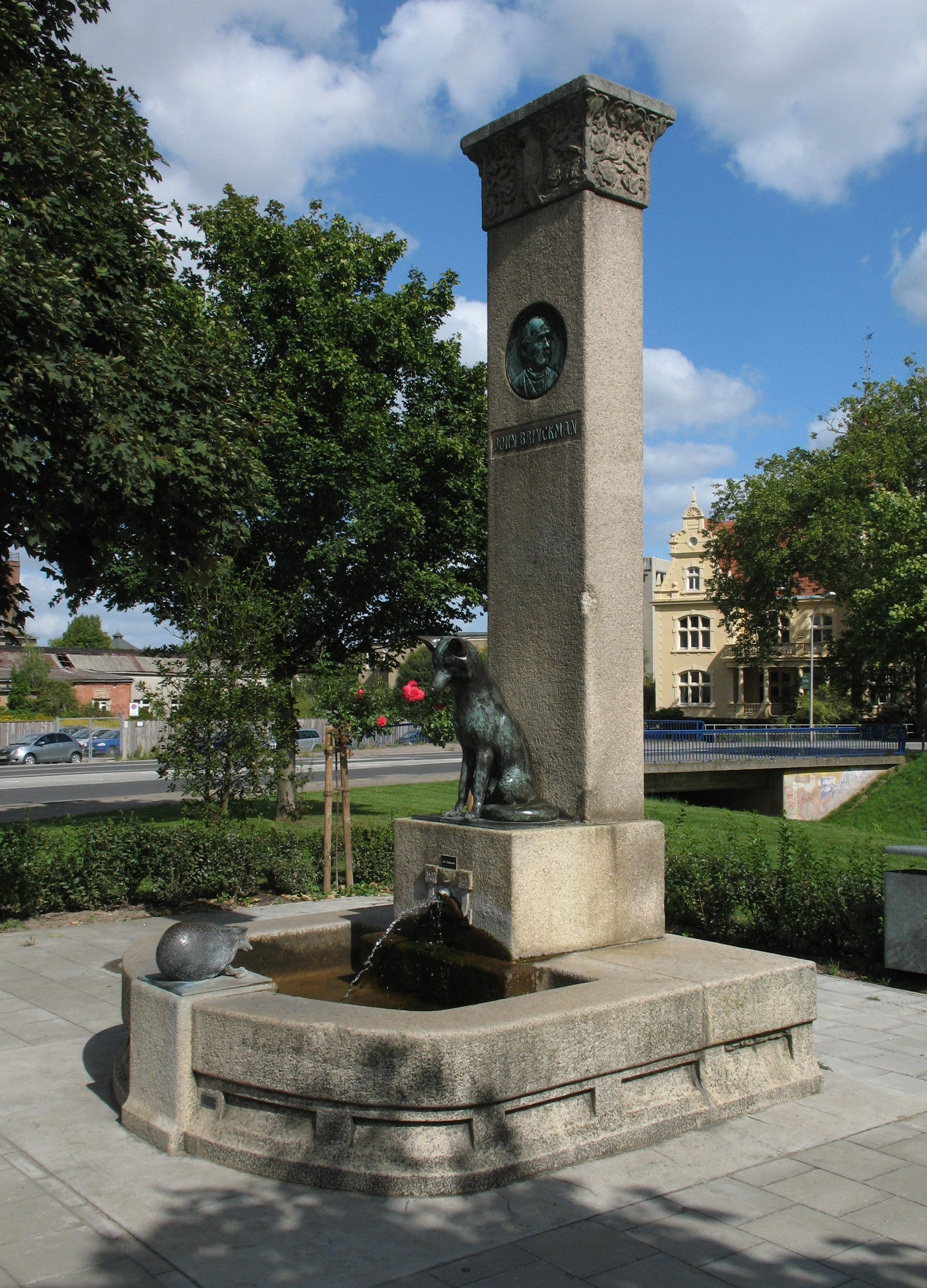
Voss un Swinegel

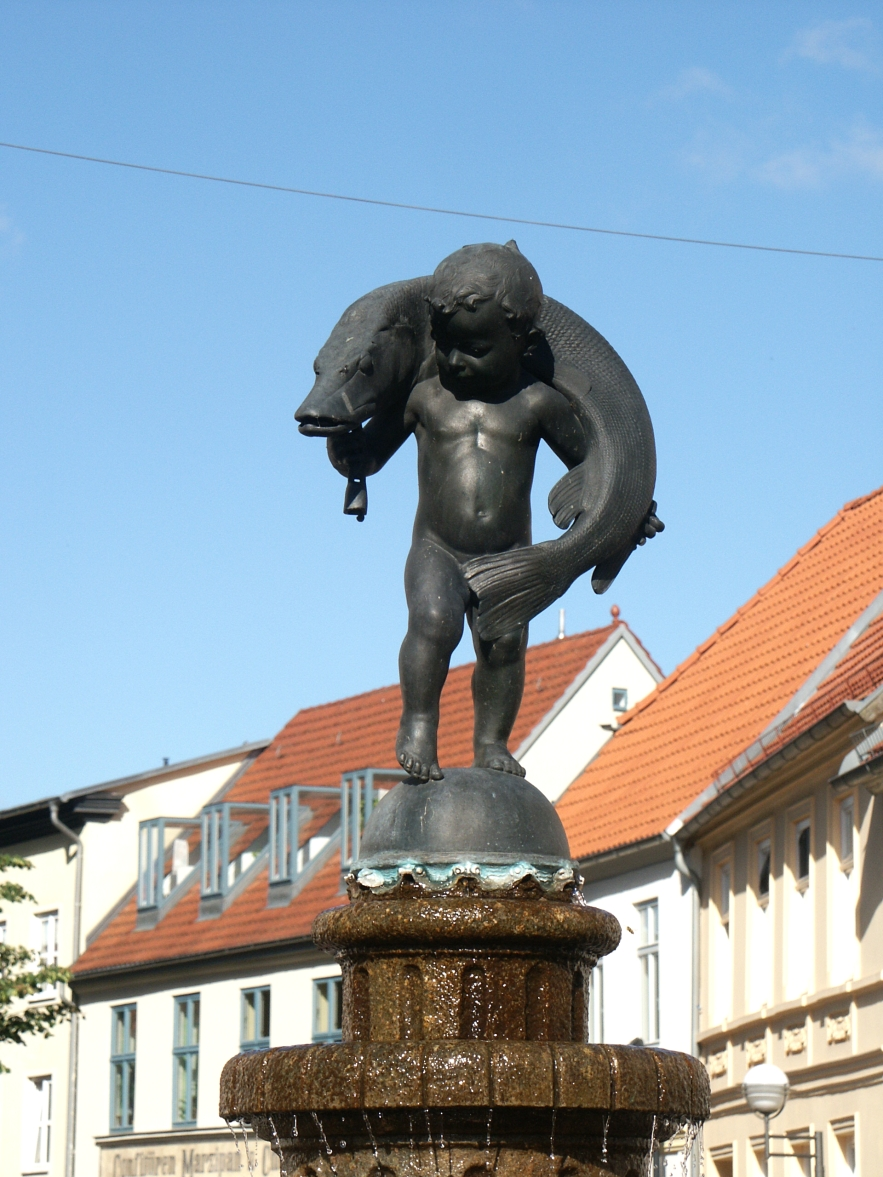
Hechtbrunnen

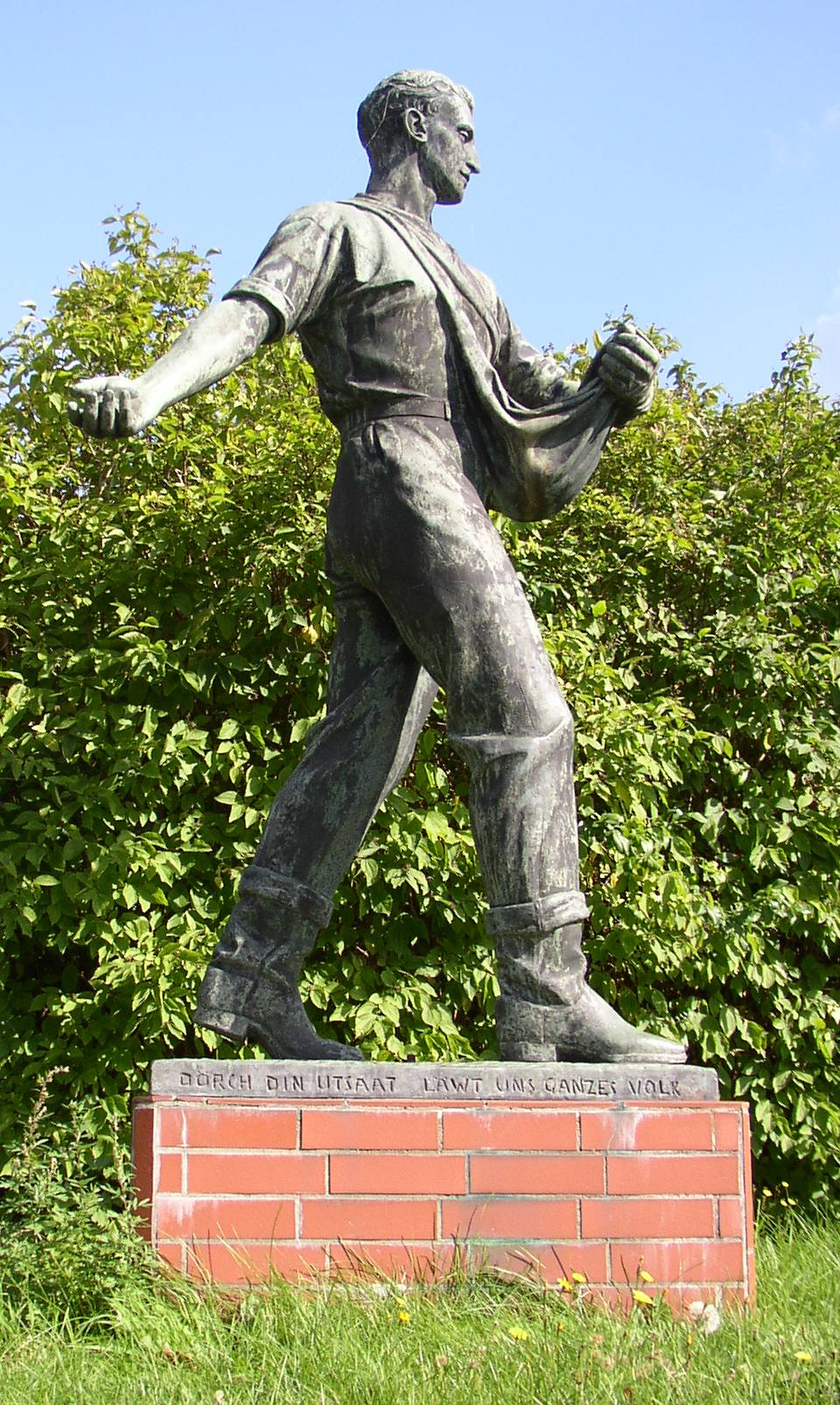
Sämann

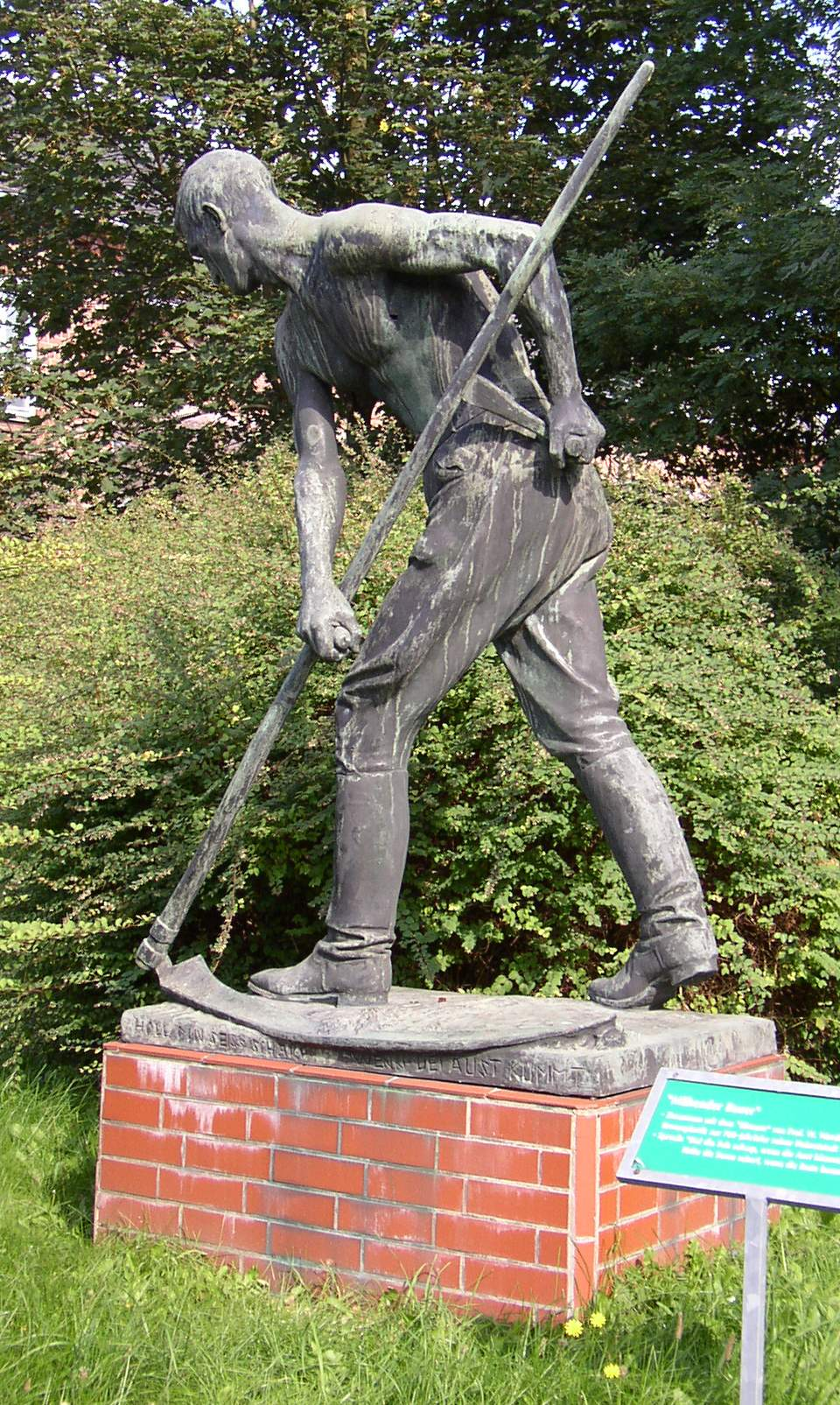
Mähender Bauer

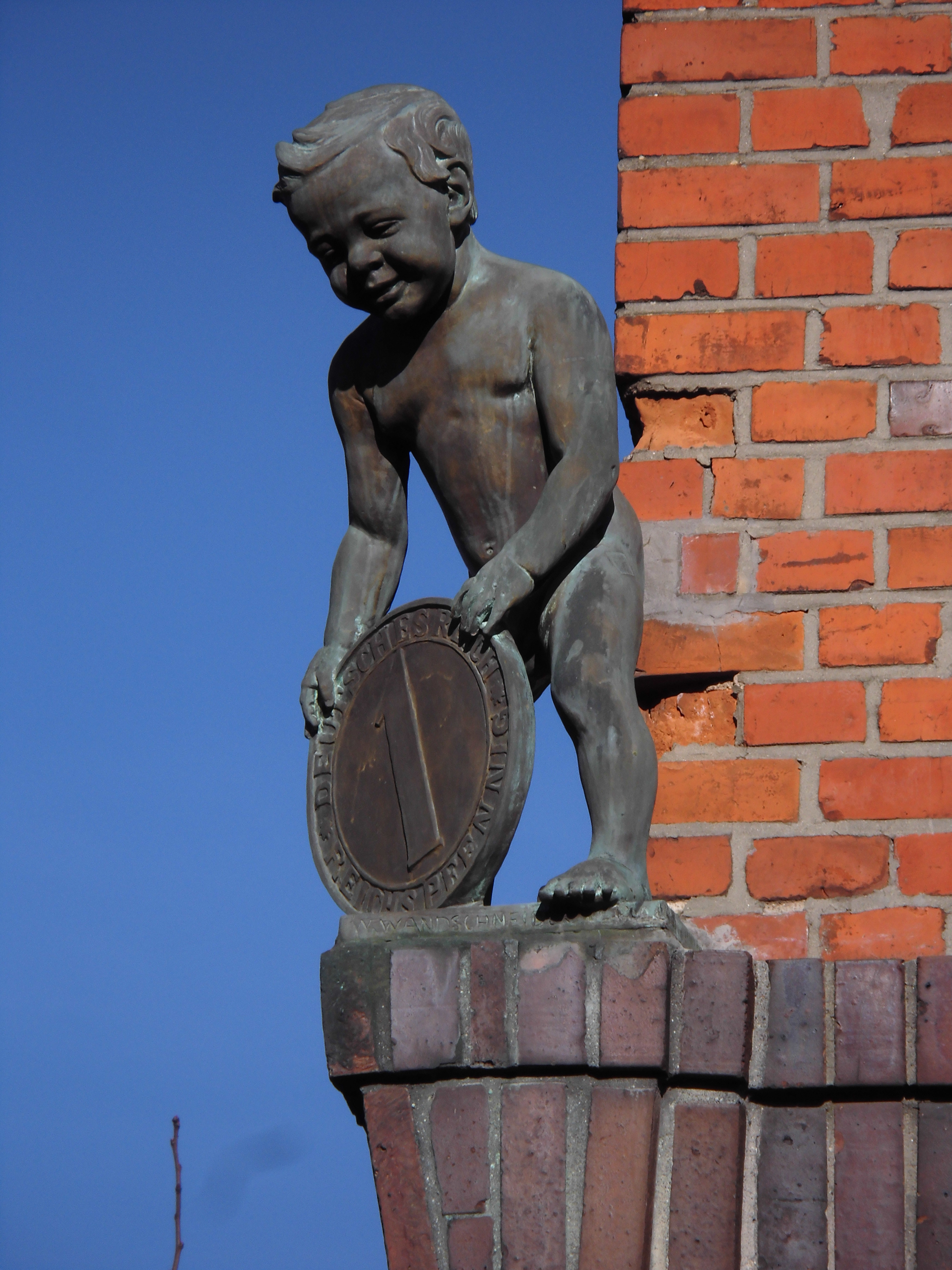
Pfennigjunge
