= Martin Wolff (sculptor) =

German sculptor

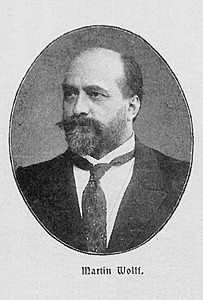
Martin Wolff; from the Hohenzollern-Jahrbuch (1907 edition)

Martin Wolff (19 May 1852, Berlin – 6 October 1919, Berlin) was a German sculptor.

== Life ==
He was the only son of sculptor Albert Wolff of Mecklenburg-Strelitz. From 1871 to 1875, he studied at the Prussian Academy of Art under Eduard Daege, followed by study trips to Vienna and Italy. His training was completed in his father's studio. In 1880, his figure group "Theseus Finden die Waffen Seines Vaters" (Theseus Finding His Father's Weapons) brought him a scholarship to Paris. From 1882 to 1883, he was in Rome and established his own studio upon returning to Berlin. The late 1890s proved to be a hard time for artists and his financial distress was relieved only when he was given a commission to work on the Kaiser's Siegesallee (Victory Avenue) project, possibly based on his father's reputation. His work earned him the Order of the Crown, Fourth Class. Although he became very successful afterward, he never grew beyond the Academic style taught to him by his father.

== Selected major works ==
- 1889-1898: Bust monuments for notable people who contributed to medicine and public health, at the Charité, Berlin: Heinrich Adolf von Bardeleben (1889), Eduard Heinrich Henoch (1890), Gustav Mehlhausen (1893), Ludwig Traube (1895) and Bernhard Spinola (1898). Due to the fact that Henoch, Traube and Spinola were Jewish, their busts were melted down in 1940. The busts have since been replaced with memorial trees.
- 1893: Fritz Reuter Monument, Neubrandenburg, created with the assistance of Wilhelm Wandschneider
- 1899: "Denkmal 1870/71" (Monument for the Franco-Prussian War), "Viktoria mit sterbendem Krieger" (Victoria with a Dying Warrior), bronze figure group. Neustrelitz, Bahnhofsplatz; destroyed in World War II
- 1901: Siegesallee Group 21, consisting of Johann Georg, Elector of Brandenburg, as the central figure; flanked by Count Rochus zu Lynar, a military engineer who built the Spandau Citadel, and Lampert Distelmeyer, Chancellor of the Margraviate of Brandenburg.
- 1906 Friedrich Ludwig Jahn, bust monument, Weißwasser, Jahn-Park.
- 1909 Frederick William, Grand Duke of Mecklenburg-Strelitz, bronze statue, Neustrelitz, Paradeplatz; destroyed in 1944.
- 1911 Joachim II Hector, Elector of Brandenburg, bronze statue, Stadtschloss, Berlin; missing and presumed destroyed.
- 1912 Gaspard II de Coligny, bronze statue, Wilhelmshaven.
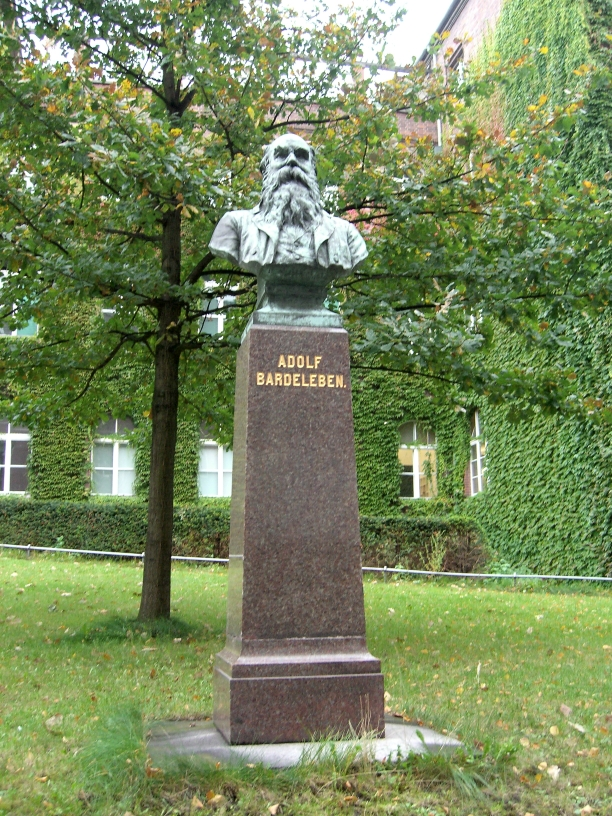
Bust of Heinrich Adolf von Bardeleben

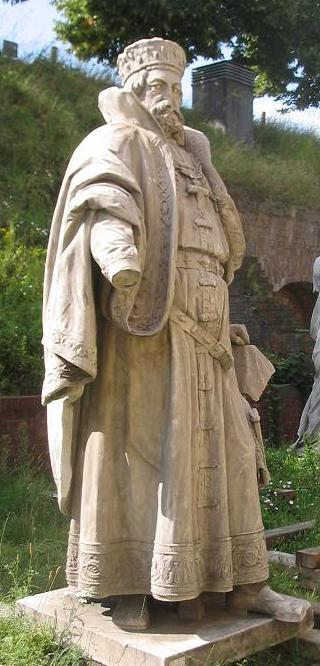
Johann Georg; now at the Spandau Citadel

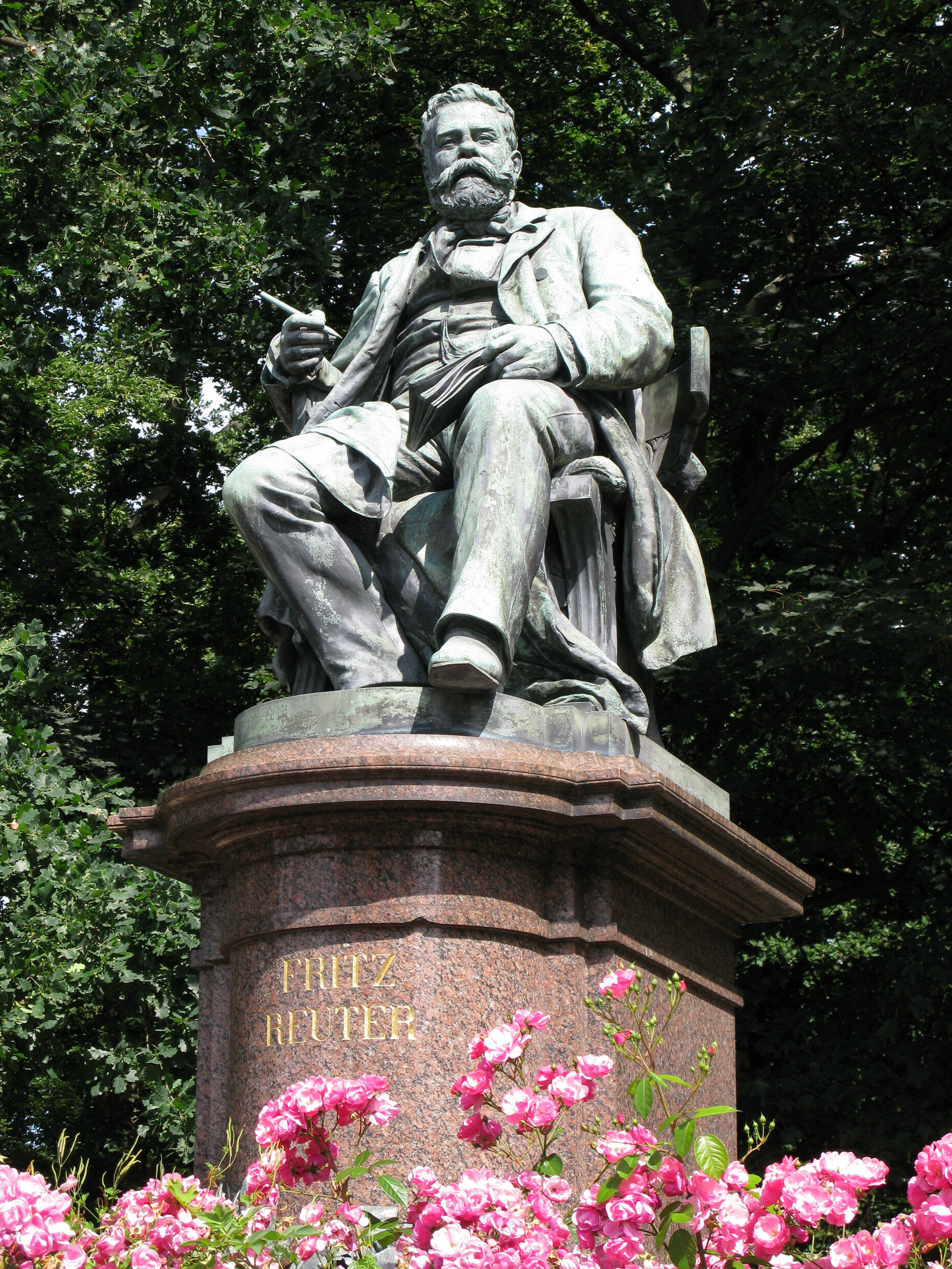
Fritz Reuter Monument, Neubrandenburg

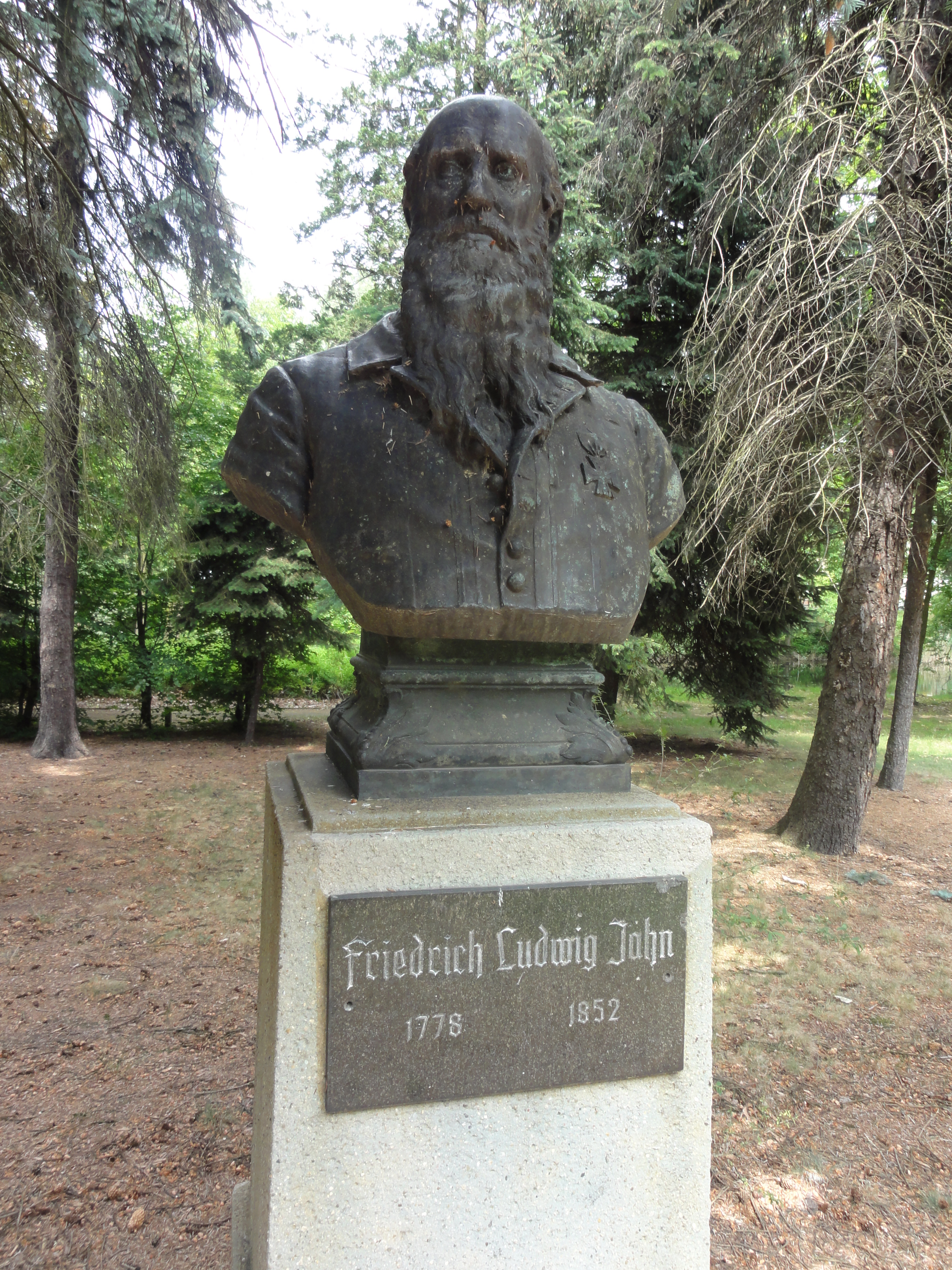
Bust of
Friedrich Ludwig Jahn

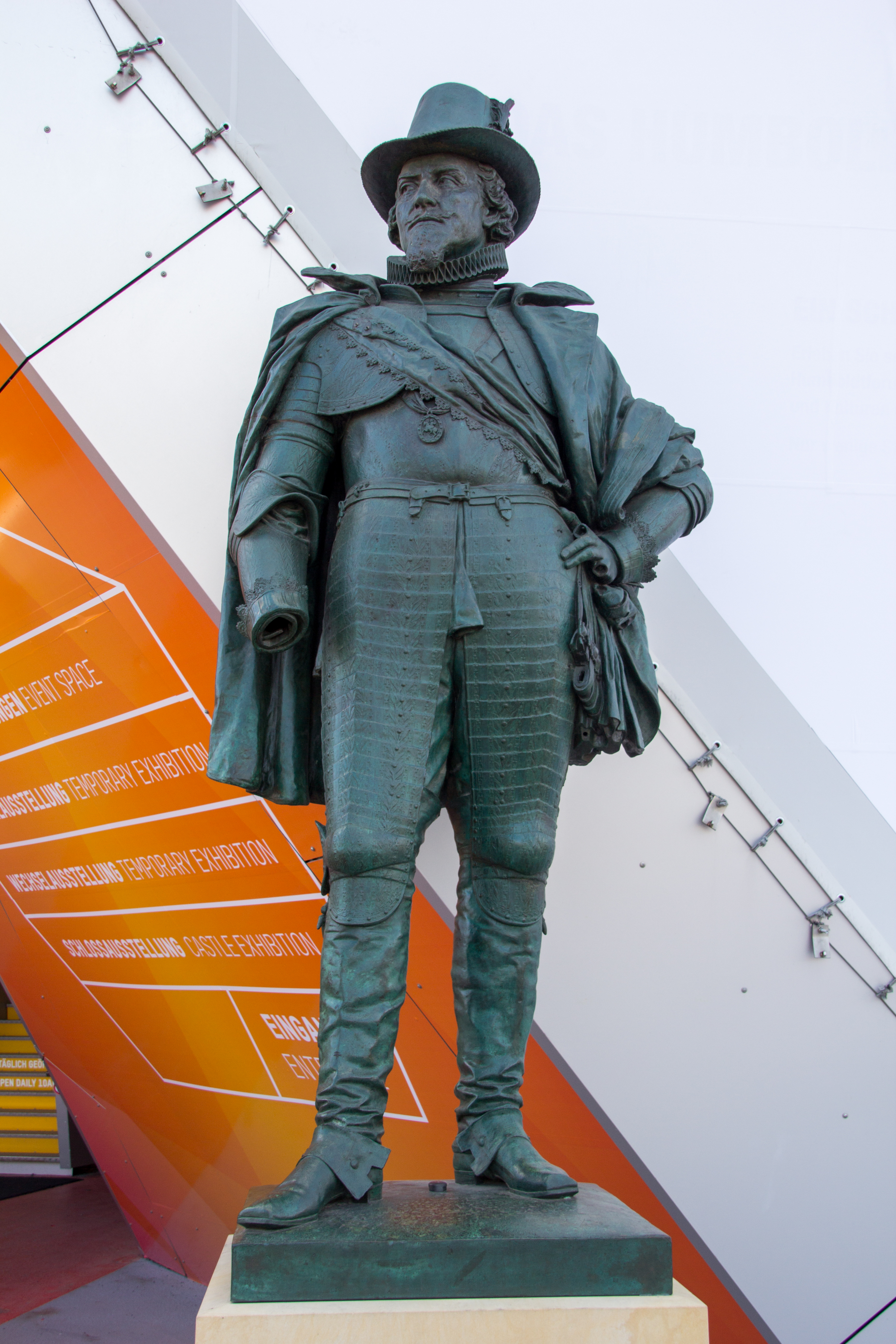
Moritz von Oranien, Berlin (1906)
