= Lampert Distelmeyer =

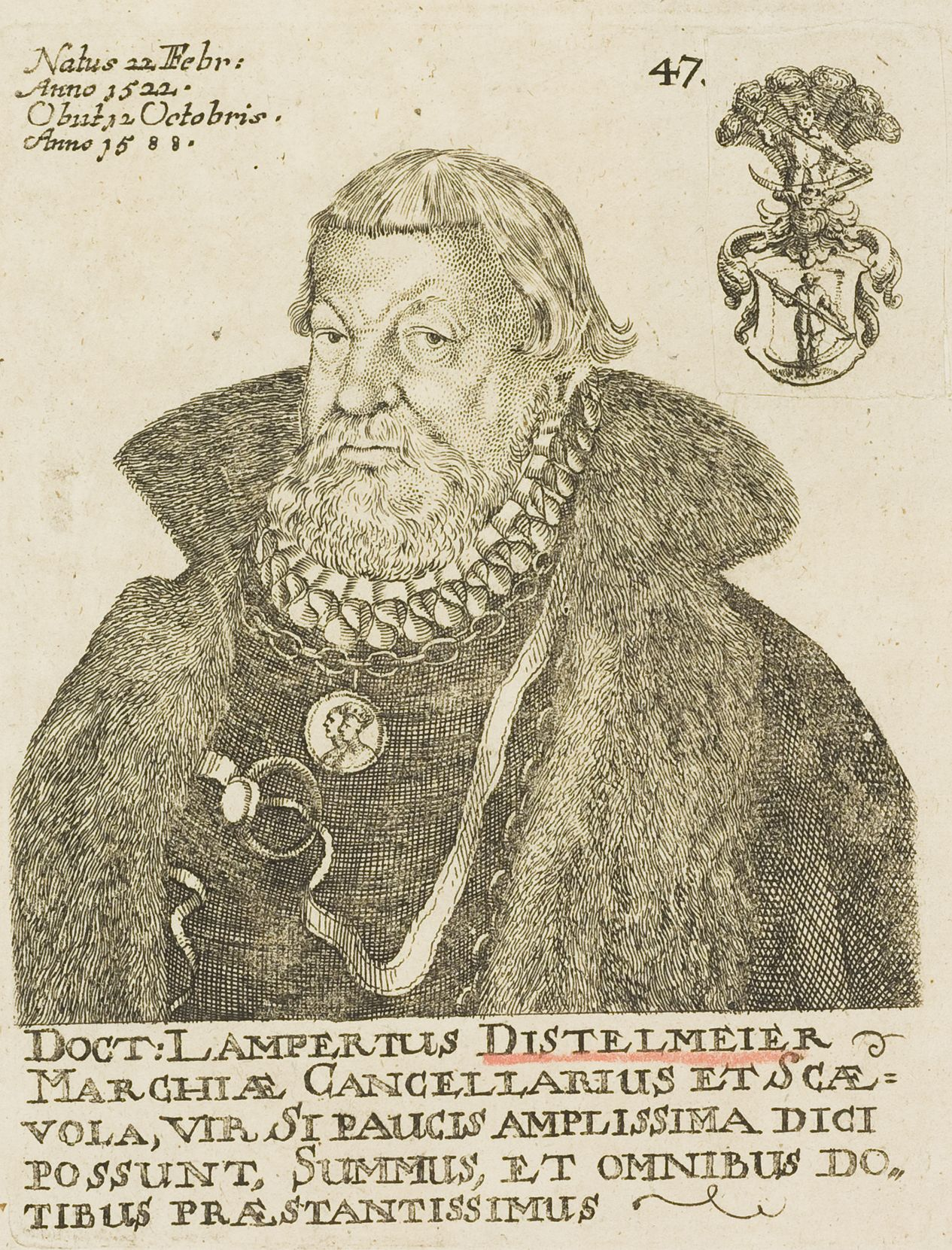
Lampert Distelmeyer, from Martin Friedrich Seidels Bilder-Sammlung (1751)

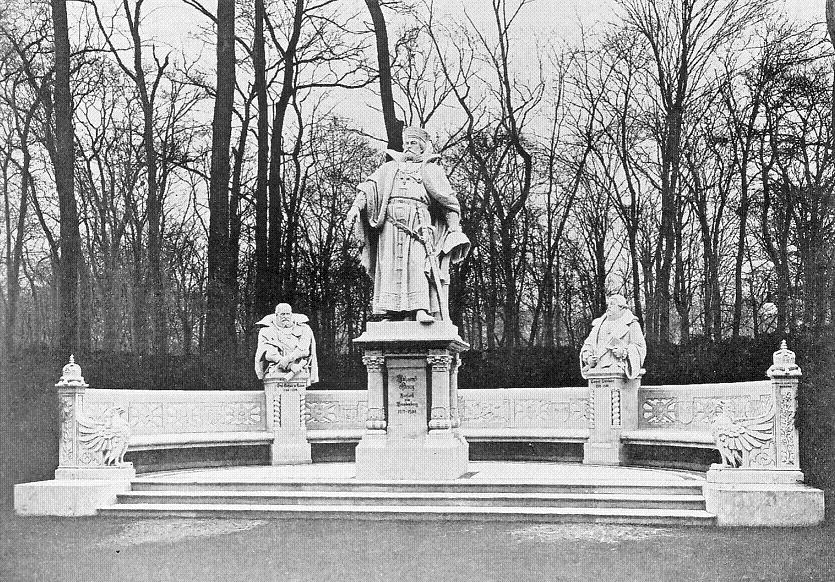
Group #21 at the Siegesallee. Distelmeyer is on the right.

Lampert Distelmeyer, or Lamprecht Distelmeyer (22 February 1522, Leipzig - 12 October 1588, Berlin) was a German jurist and Chancellor of Mark Brandenburg.

== Life ==
His family was originally from Lüneburg, and received their Bürgerrechts for Leipzig in 1490. His father was a tailor. He originally studied theology at St. Thomas School but, on the advice of Philipp Melanchthon, switched to law in 1542.

Three years later, he was working as an advisor for Chancellor Simon Pistorius in Merseburg. In 1546, he returned to Leipzig to complete his studies. He then became Syndic for the city of Bautzen and earned his doctorate from the law faculty of Leipzig University. In 1549, he married Elisabeth Goldhan, the daughter of a merchant. Their son Christian, served as the Chancellor of Mark Brandenburg from 1588 to 1598.

Shortly after, he was appointed to the Kurfürstlicher Rat (Electoral Council) of Joachim II Hector, Elector of Brandenburg, representing him in numerous legal matters and at the foreign embassies. In 1558, following the death of Johann Weinlob, he was named the new Chancellor. In 1569, he helped secure the transfer of the Duchy of Prussia, from King Sigismund II Augustus of Poland to Albert Frederick of the Brandenburg Hohenzollerns. As a result, he was granted a knighthood. He was also the Lord of Mahlsdorf (now part of Berlin).

In 1895, he was chosen to be one of the historical figures represented on the Siegesallee (Victory Avenue), a monument garden in Berlin. His marble bust was created by the sculptor, Martin Wolff, and was unveiled in 1901. It was damaged during World War II, as were most of the others, and is now in storage at the Spandau Citadel.
