= Johann Gottfried Niedlich =

German painter, illustrator and art teacher

River landscapes
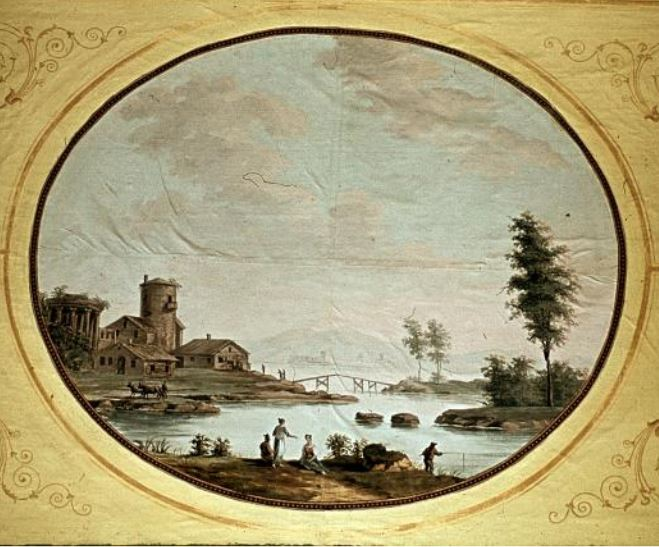
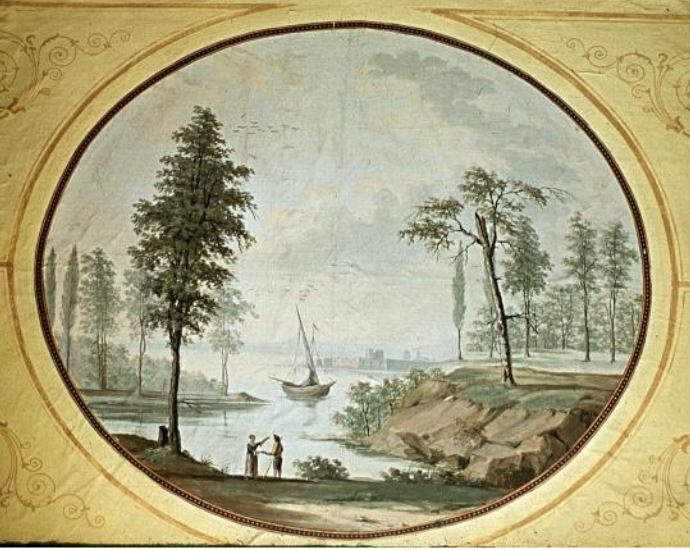
Supraportes at Charlottenburg Palace

Johann Gottfried Niedlich (5 September 1766, Berlin - 12 August 1837, Berlin) was a German painter, illustrator and art teacher.

== Biography ==
He studied in Berlin at the Prussian Academy of Arts with Bernhard Rode and Johann Christoph Frisch. He found employment as a teacher at a local drawing school in 1789. From 1795 to 1800, he lived in Italy, then returned to Berlin.

In 1801, he was appointed a Professor and member of the Senate at the Academy and, after 1812, was personally in charge of all the drawing lessons. He had several notable students, including Eduard Daege, Carl Georg Enslen, Friedrich Jentzen, Carl Friedrich Hampe and Theodor Hildebrandt.

In addition to his work as a teacher, from 1800 to 1824 he created several large oil paintings on mythological subjects. In 1802, he created ceiling paintings at the City Palace, Potsdam. In 1818, following a fire at the Schauspielhaus Berlin, he participated in reconstructive work by providing allegorical wall paintings. He also did decorative paintings for Charlottenburg Palace.

He died shortly before his 71st birthday and was interred at the Dreifaltigkeitskirchhof II. His cast-iron grave cross has been preserved, and is the oldest cross of its type in the cemetery.
