= Franz Eduard Meyerheim =

German genre painter

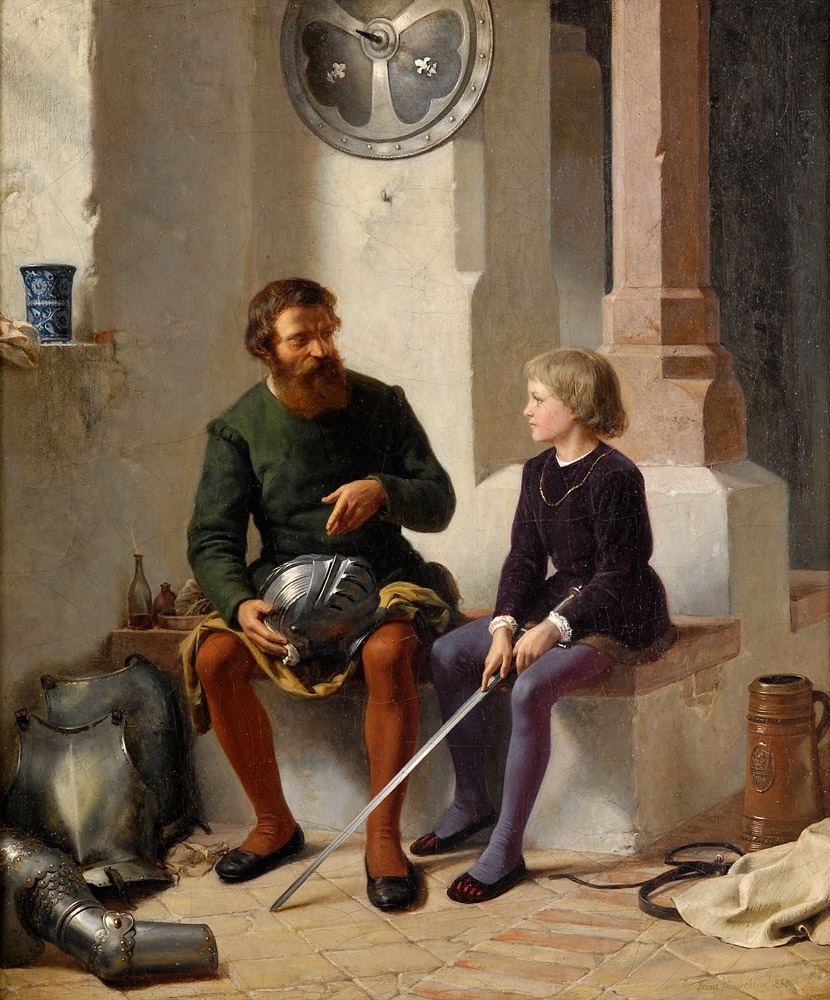
The New Suit of Armor

Franz Eduard Meyerheim (10 October 1838, Berlin - 5 April 1880, Marburg) was a German genre painter.

== Life and work ==
His father was the painter Friedrich Eduard Meyerheim. His younger brother, Paul Friedrich Meyerheim, was also a painter.

His first art lessons were provided by his family members. In 1854, at the age of sixteen, he entered the Prussian Academy of Arts. Four years later, he transferred to the Kunstakademie Düsseldorf and had his first exhibition. He also travelled extensively, to Tyrolia, Belgium, Italy and Switzerland, making sketches of humble, rural people, who would be his primary subjects.

Following a reorganization of the Prussian Academy, he was appointed Professor of anatomical drawing, a post he held until 1878, when illness forced him to retire. He died two years later, while convalescing in Marburg, at the age of forty-two. The cause of death was given as a "softening of the brain" (encephalomalacia).

== Sources ==
- Lionel von Donop (1885). "Meyerheim, Franz". Allgemeine Deutsche Biographie (in German). Vol. 21. Leipzig: Duncker & Humblot. pp. 642–643.
- Extract from the Bénézit Dictionary of Artists @ Oxford Art Online
