= Paul Friedrich Meyerheim =

German painter

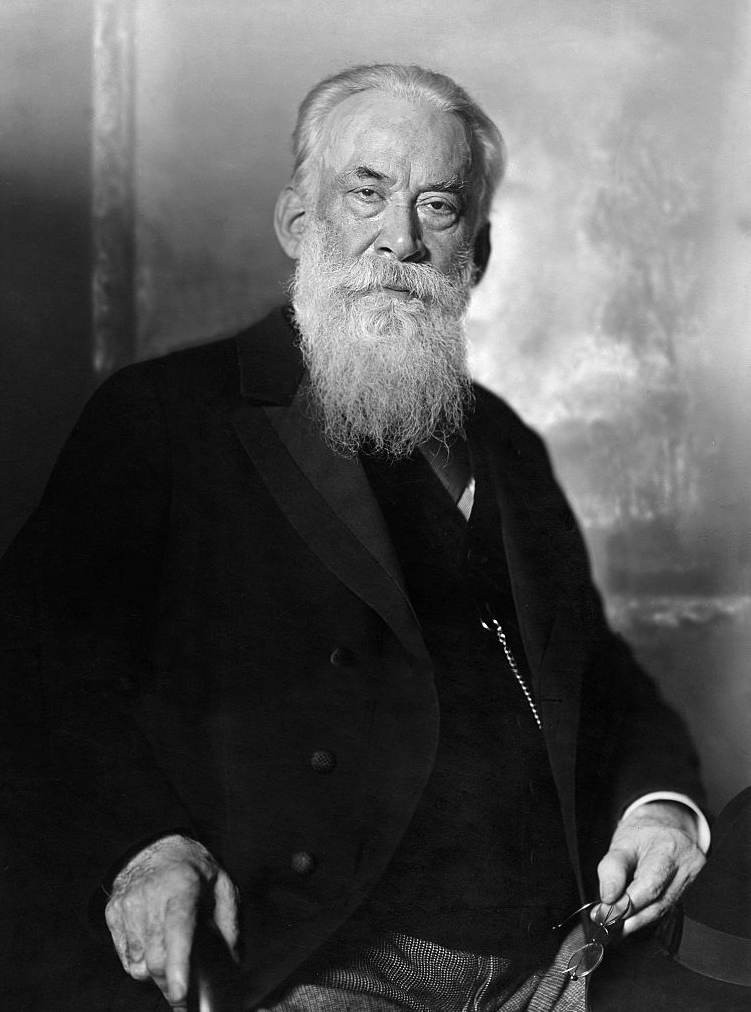
- Paul Meyerheim, by Nicola Perscheid (1915)
- Born: 13 July 1842; Berlin, Kingdom of Prussia
- Died: 14 September 1915 (aged 73); Berlin, Germany
- Education: Prussian Academy of Arts
- Known for: Painter, teacher
- Movement: Orientalist

Paul Friedrich Meyerheim (13 July 1842 – 14 September 1915) was a German painter and graphic artist. He did portraits and landscapes, but is best known as a painter of animals.

== Life ==
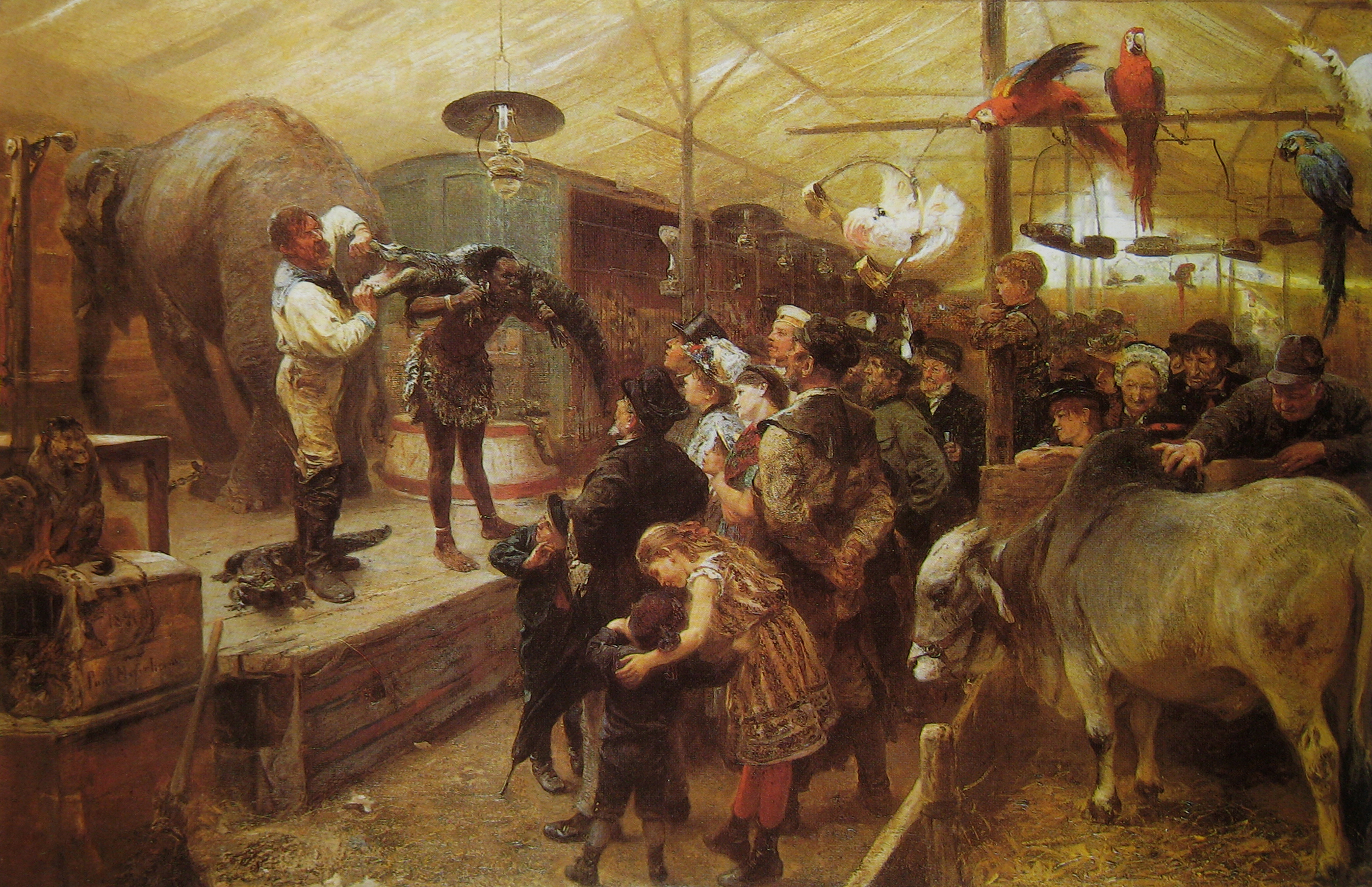
Menagerie

Paul Friedrich Meyerheim was born in Berlin on 13 July 1842. He and his brother took their first art lessons from his father. As a young boy, he was fascinated with the new Berlin Zoological Gardens and went there so often he was able to befriend Martin Lichtenstein, the zoo's founder, who allowed him into areas that were normally closed to the public. This experience led him to specialize in animal painting.

From 1857 to 1860 he attended the Prussian Academy of Arts. Later, he made several study trips to Switzerland, Belgium and the Netherlands and spent a year in Paris. In 1883, he established an animal painting class at the Academy. He was appointed a Professor there in 1887 and became a member of the Academic Senate.

Meyerheim was a friend of the Borsig family, owners of the Borsig-Werke, a company that manufactured railroad locomotives. He produced many illustrations and designs especially for them. A major attraction at the Great Berlin Art Exhibition in 1912 was a series of seven huge images, painted on copper, that he had done for the Borsigs in 1873/76. The panels were called "Lebensgeschichte einer Lokomotive" (Life History of a Locomotive) and were originally intended for the garden loggia at their home in Alt-Moabit. Some panels are now in the possession of the Märkisches Museum in Berlin-Mitte and the Deutschen Technikmuseum.

Paul Friedrich Meyerheim died in Berlin on 14 September 1915 and was buried in Berlin's Friedrichsfelde Cemetery.

== Other painters in the Meyerheim family ==
His father was the painter Friedrich Eduard Meyerheim (1808–1879); his elder brother, Franz Eduard Meyerheim, was also a painter as were his uncles, Wilhelm Alexander (1815–1882) and Hermann (fl.1860s).

== Panels from Life History of a Locomotive ==
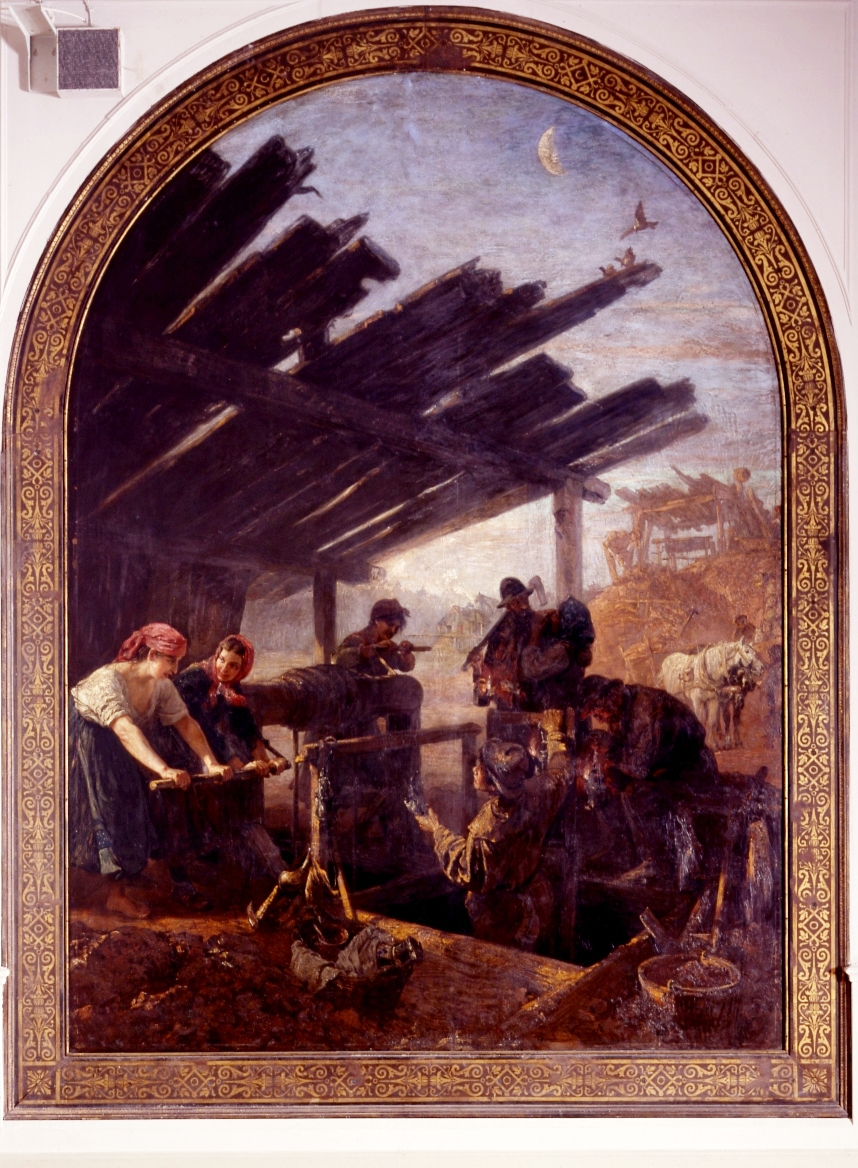
Extraction of the Ore

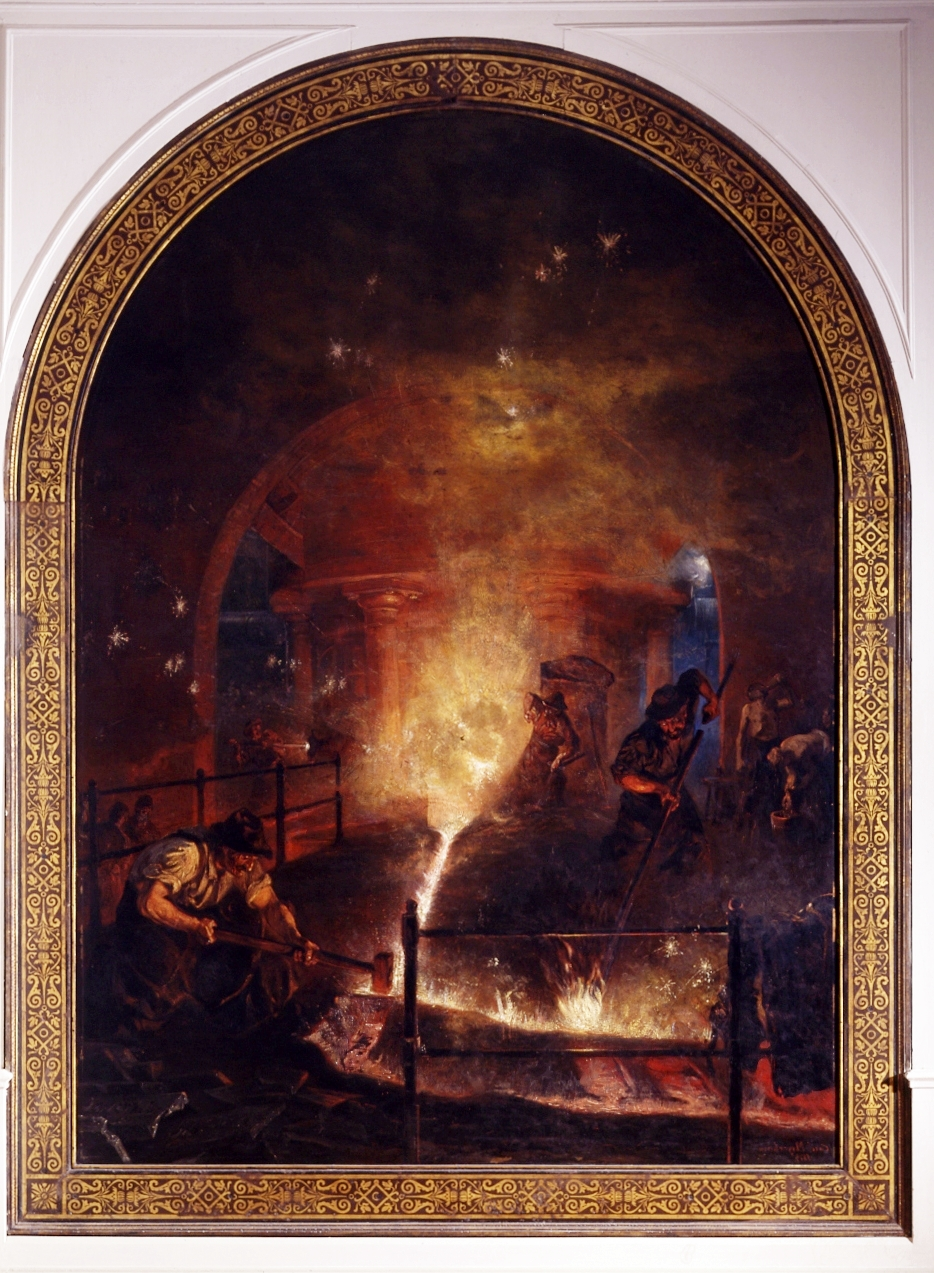
Blast Furnace Slag

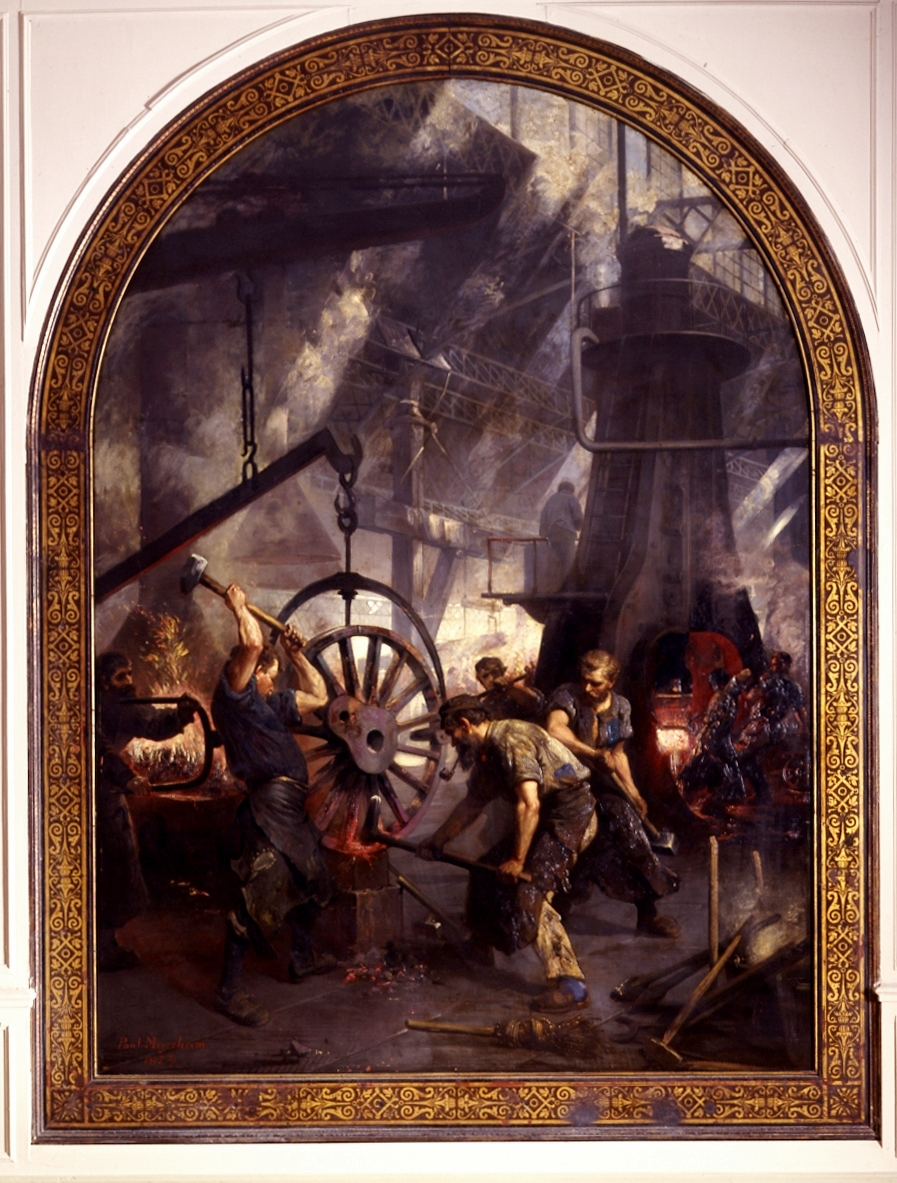
Engineering Works

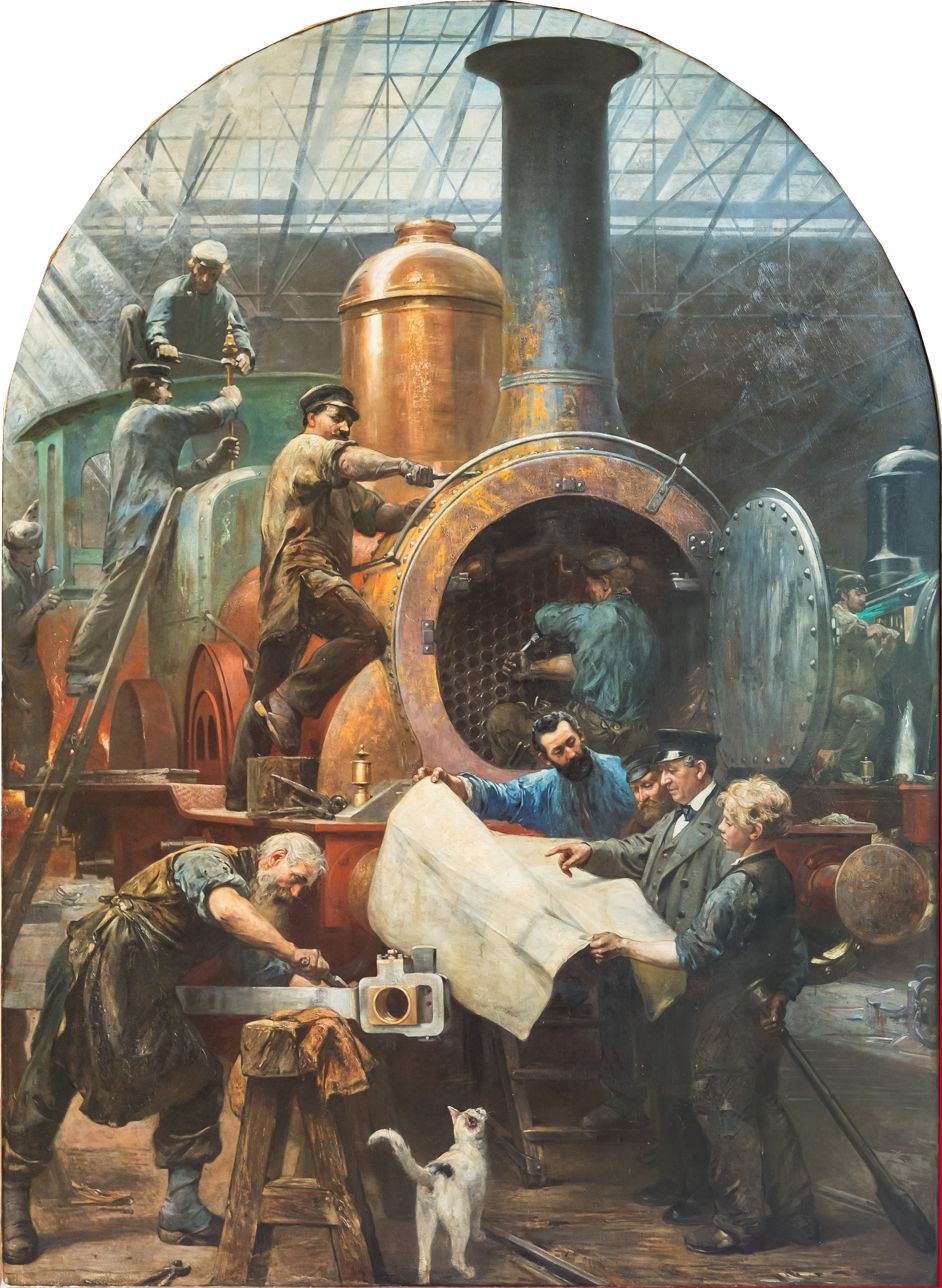
Locomotive Construction

== See also ==
- German Wikipedia: Lebensgeschichte einer Lokomotive
- List of Orientalist artists
- Orientalism
