= Johann Carl Enslen =

German painter

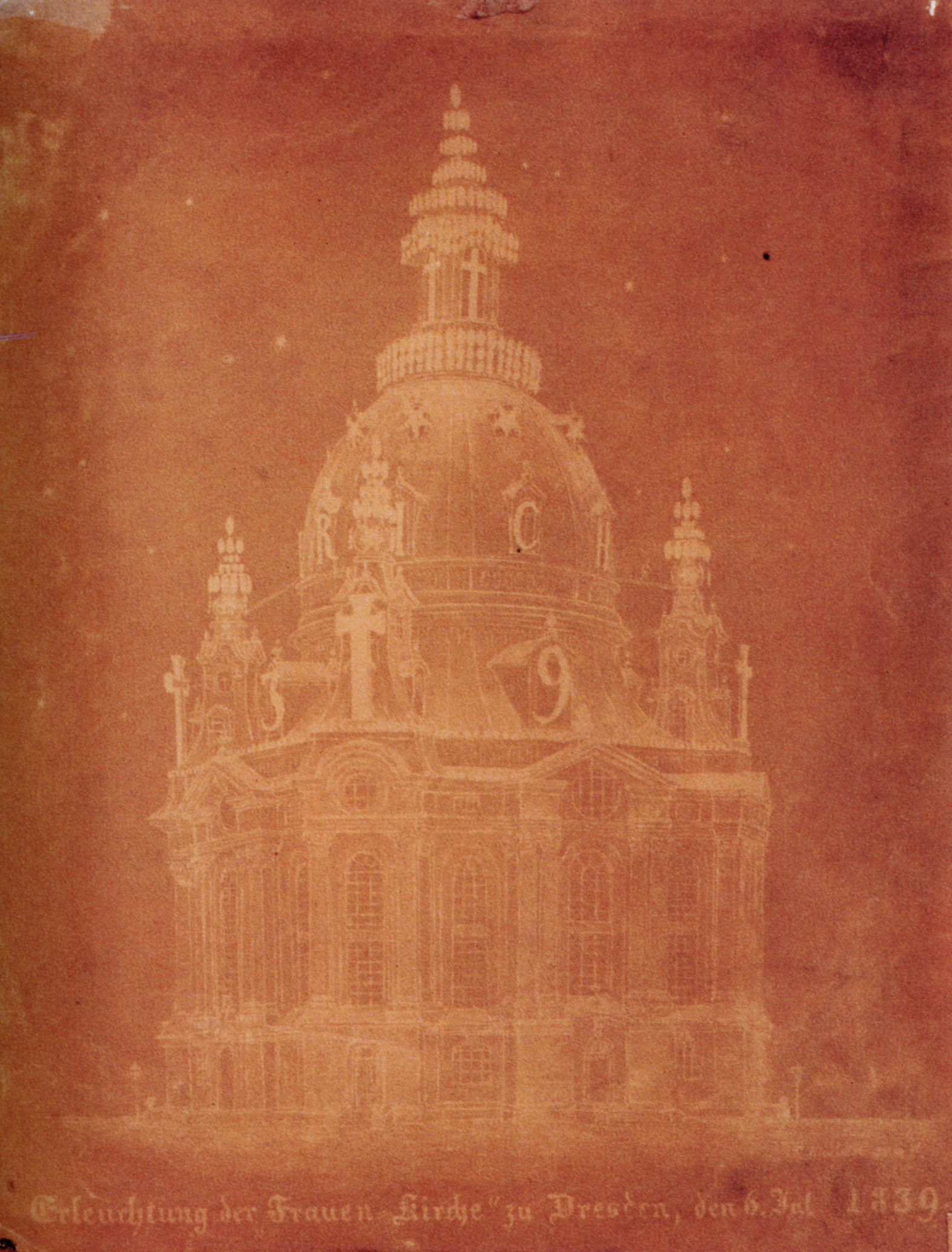
Photogenic drawing of the Dresden Frauenkirche, 1839

Johann Carl Enslen, a German landscape painter, who was born in 1769 and died in 1849, was well known in his time for his panoramas, which were the first introduced into Germany. He worked with his son Carl Georg Enslen.

== Sources ==
- Thieme-Becker: Allgemeines Lexikon der bildenden Künstler, vol. 10, Leipzig 1914, p. 568

Attribution:
