= Carl Georg Enslen =

German painter

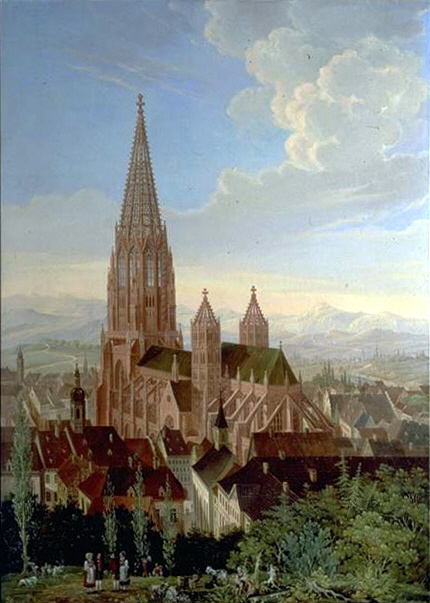
Freiburg Minster, 1839, now in the Swiss National Museum

Carl Georg Enslen (20 September 1792 – 17 April 1866) was an Austrian-born German painter.

== Biography ==
Enslen was born in Vienna in 1792, and studied at the Academy of Berlin. He travelled in Italy, Sweden, Norway, and Denmark, and his panoramas give proof of a knowledge of excellent linear and aerial perspective. He was the son of Johann Carl Enslen, with whom he worked closely. He died in Lille, France in 1866, aged 73.

== Collections ==
His work is included in the collections of the Swedish National Museum, the Swiss National Museum, Zurich, the City History Museum, Leipzig, and the Sankt-Anne Museum in Lübeck, Germany.

== Gallery ==
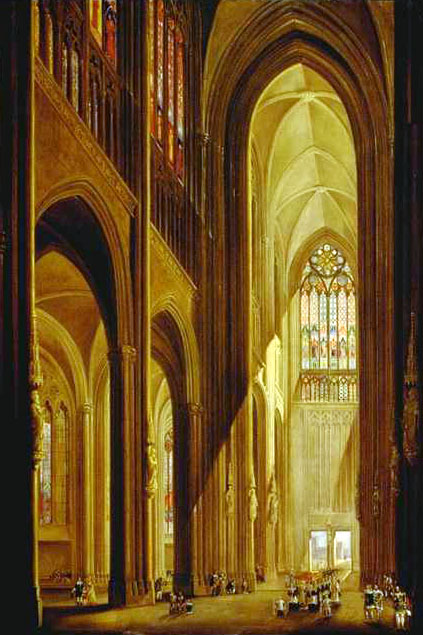
Inner view of the Cologne Cathedral, 1838

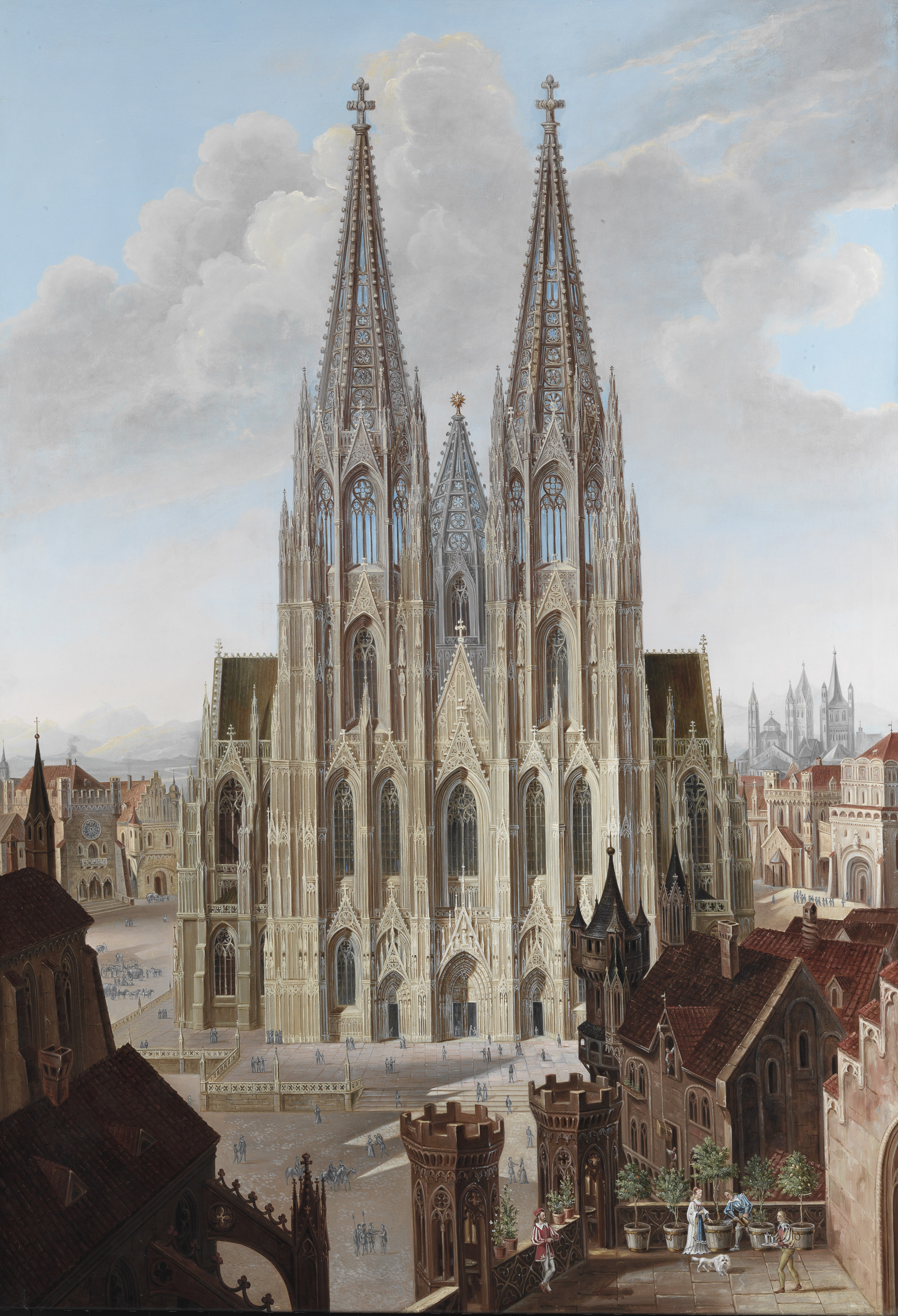
Idealistic view of the Cologne Cathedral, 1839

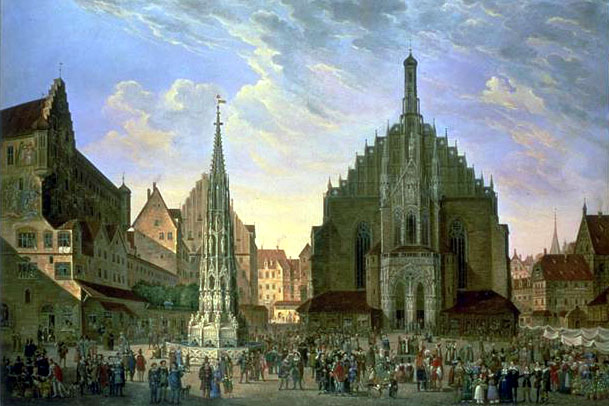
Main square of Nuremberg, 1839
