= Eduard Daege =

German painter

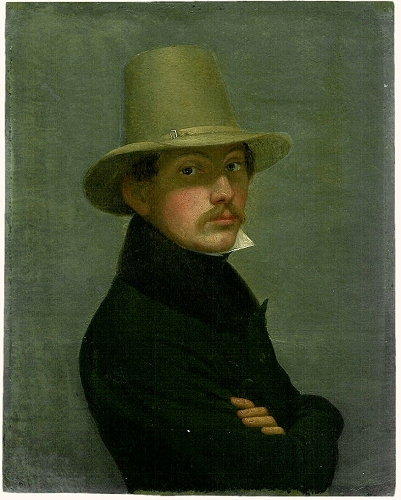
Self-portrait (date unknown)

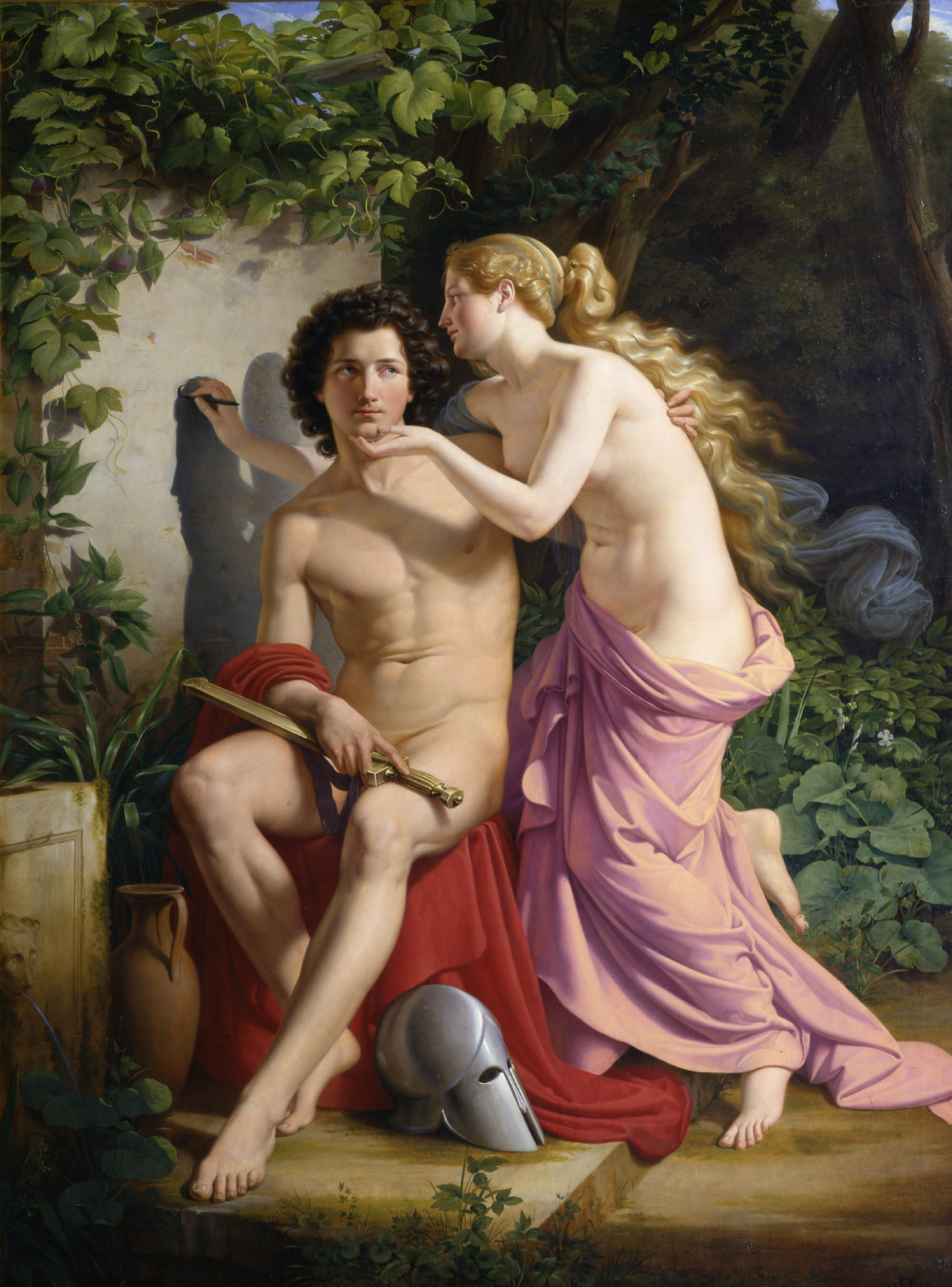
The Invention of Painting (1832)

Eduard Wilhelm Daege (10 April 1805 – 6 June 1883) was a German painter who served as Director for both the Prussian Academy of Art and the National Gallery.

== Life ==
He was born in Berlin. In 1820, he entered the Prussian Academy of Art, where he studied under Johann Gottfried Niedlich and later (in 1823) with the Court Painter Karl Wilhelm Wach. In 1821, he may have been involved in painting the frescoes for Karl Friedrich Schinkel's Schauspielhaus at the Gendarmenmarkt. From 1832 to 1833, he accompanied Karl Eduard Biermann on a study trip to Rome and Naples.

Daege became a member of the Academy in 1835 and, beginning in 1838, taught drawing classes there. In 1840, he was appointed a Professor. He participated in painting the murals at the Neues Museum and in the chapel at the Berliner Stadtschlosses. From 1861 to 1874, he was Director of the Academy, a position which included managing the newly founded National Gallery. He died in 1883 in Berlin.

== Major works ==
- 1846–52: Geburt Christi (The Nativity), Anbetung der Hirten (Adoration of the Shepherds) and twenty-four assorted angel figures/heads at the Stadtschlosses.
- 1847–55: Rome, Jerusalem, Constantinople and Aachen, allegorical murals in the north dome-hall of the Neues Museum.
- 1856: Altarpiece in the convent at the monastery in Ribnitz-Damgarten.
