= Neustroevs-Bashkirov manor house =

Architectural ensemble in Russia

- Усадьба Неустроевых — А. Я. Башкирова
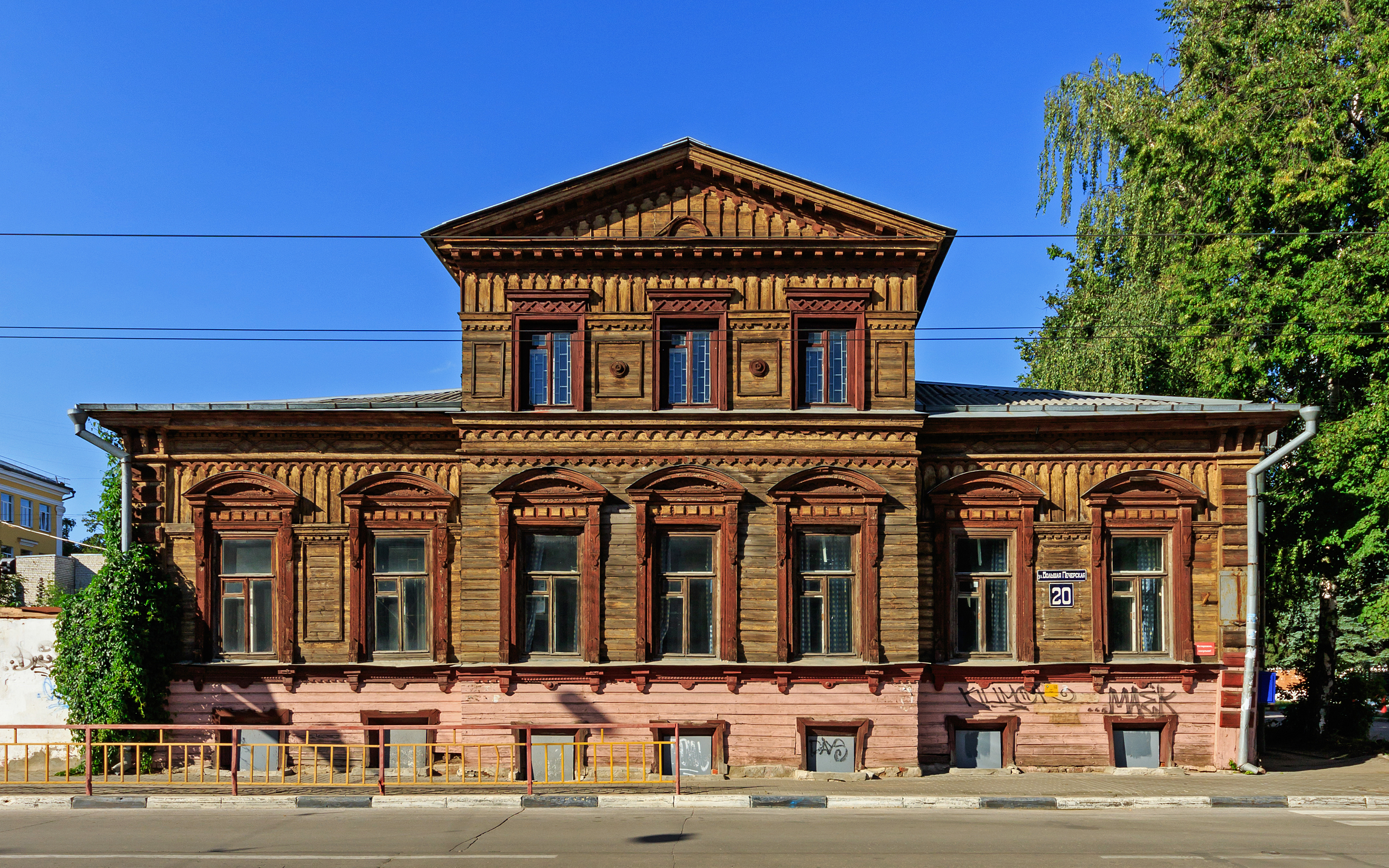
- Interactive map of the Neustroevs-Bashkirov manor house area

General information
- Architectural style: eclectic, modern
- Location: Nizhny Novgorod, Russia
- Coordinates: 56.3256°N 44.0208°E
- Completed: 1806

Neustroevs-Bashkirov manor house (Russian: Усадьба Неустроевых — А. Я. Башкирова) is an architectural ensemble in the downtown Nizhny Novgorod. The main building was founded in the 1806, the building wing was built in the 1902–1903.

The main building is one of the most important samples of wooden architecture in Nizhny Novgorod. The building wing and the horse stable are the unique parts of Nizhny Novgorod's modern art.

These historical buildings are cultural heritage of Russian Federation.

== History ==
The manor house was built by Emelyan Bashkirov as its first owner. Emelyan Bashkirov — tradesperson with his own river flotilla of a steamships and barges, landlord and mills owner, one of the richest persons in Nizhny Novgorod.

The main wooden building was founded in the 1806. The stone building wing was built in the 1902–1903.

== Architecture ==
Since its inception, the manor house with modest design/decoration was typical urban wooden house in best of Russian classicism.

== Literature ==
- Филатов Н. Ф. (1994). Г. В. Гундарин (ed.). Нижний Новгород: Архитектура XIV — начала XX в. Энциклопедия Нижегородского края (30 000 экз ed.). Нижний Новгород: РИЦ «Нижегородские новости». ISBN 5-88452-008-5.
- Шумилкин С. М.; А.С.Шумилкин (2010). Архитектурно-пространственное формирование Нижнего Новгорода ХIII — начала ХХ вв.: учебное пособие. Н.Новгород: ННГАСУ.
