= Devkesen =

Archaeological site in Turkmenistan

Coordinates: 42°17′15″N 58°23′56″E

Devkesen (also: Dev-Kesken; Turkmen: Döwkesen) is an archaeological site in the Dashoguz region of northern Turkmenistan, 62 km west of Koneurgench.

== Location ==
It is located at the edges of a 30 km-long escarpment, on the southern tip of the Ustyurt Plateau.

== History ==
The site appears to have been settled around 4th century BCE. It corresponds to the medieval settlement of Vazir. In the early 16th century the town was the first capital of what would later be known as the Khanate of Khiva.

In 1558, English diplomat and traveler Anthony Jenkinson had visited the town and spoken favorably of the local melon produce. Jenkinson already noted the rivers to be drying and Vazir would be abandoned soon.

== Site ==
The sides of the city facing the plateau are walled. Within the city, lie the ruins of three mausolea —dating to 15th century— and a mosque. A citadel with corrugated walls overlooks the escarpment.

Devkesen is a huge rectangle of stone walls with numerous towers and a complex gate structure. Around the fortress there was a deep ditch carved into the slope. At the foot of the “upper city” there is located, close to the rock, the second rectangle of the “lower city”, surrounded by walls, dating back to the late Middle Ages. To the south-west of both cities lies the third rectangle - the layout of an extensive late medieval park. The ancient, well-preserved fortifications here were widely used as the basis for the medieval defensive system. The fortress rises picturesquely above the 30-meter cliff of Ustyurt Plateau, crowned with the magnificent outlines of a mighty adobe citadel tower and a row of late medieval mausoleums stretched along it.

In the late Middle Ages, a reloigious-memorial ensemble was formed in Devkesen, from which a mosque and 3 mausoleums remained, the names of which have not been preserved. The main mausoleum has a high portal on the main facade and vaulted niches on the rest, covered with a dome on top. The other two mausoleums were built using the same design and compositional techniques. All three mausoleums were built parallel to the fortress wall. The almost completely destroyed building of the mosque during its existence had a courtyard surrounded by arched galleries on pillars; the walls and pillars were made of stone, while the domes and arches were made of baked brick. The decor on these monuments has not been preserved. Devkesen is one of the most picturesque monuments of medieval Khorezm architecture.

=== Tourism ===
The site was a tourism mainstay till c. 2003, when Turkmen Army started prohibiting visitors on the ground that the access-road passed through Uzbek territory.
