= Blücher Memorial, Berlin =

Monument in Berlin, Germany

Blücher Memorial
- Blücher-Denkmal (German)
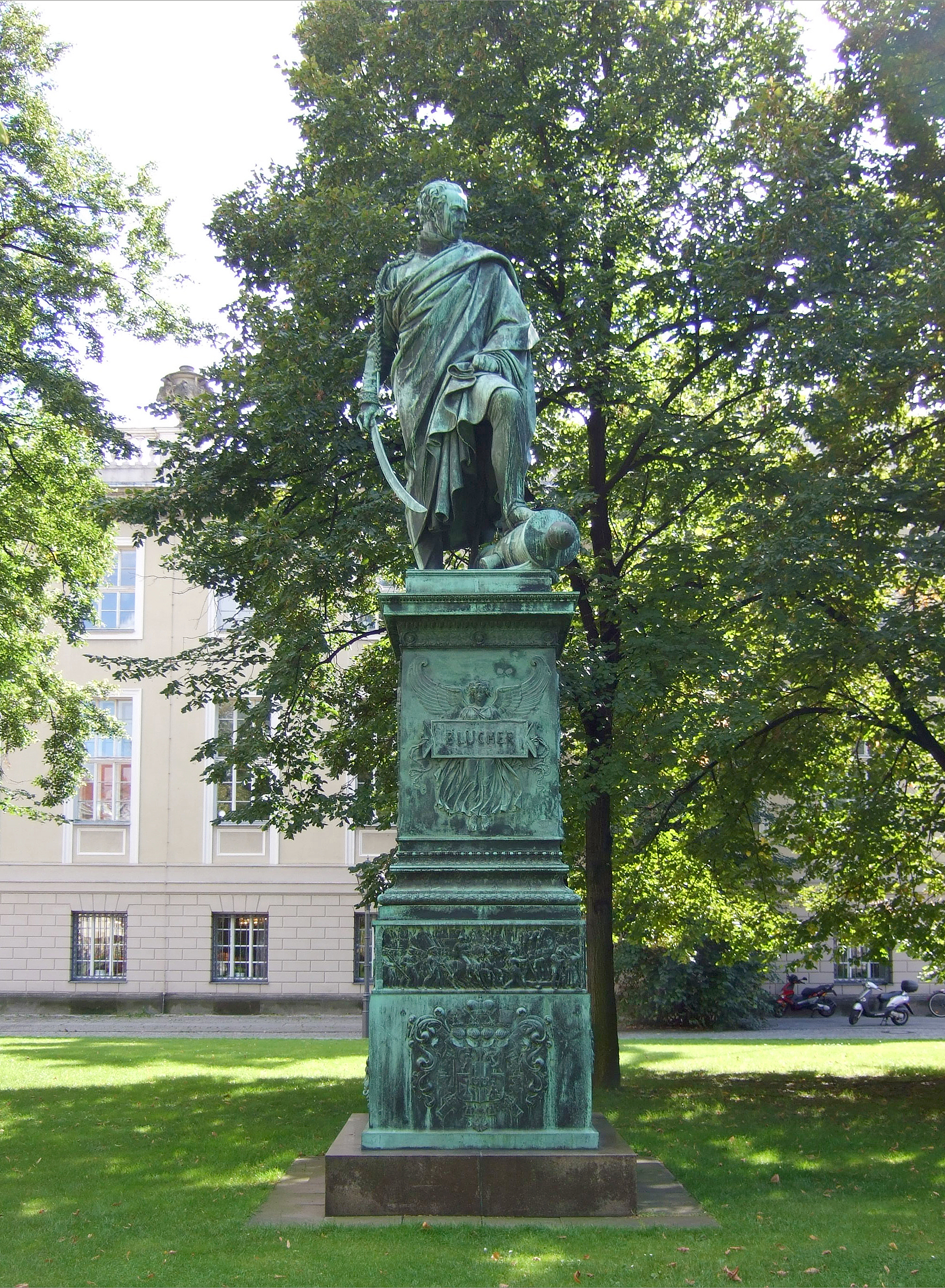
- Artist: Christian Daniel Rauch
- Year: 1826
- Medium: Bronze
- Dimensions: 7.85 m (25.8 ft)
- Location: Bebelplatz, Berlin, Germany

The Blücher Memorial on Bebelplatz green space in Berlin's Mitte district commemorates the Prussian field marshal and freedom fighter Gebhard Leberecht von Blücher (1742–1819). Created from 1819 to 1826 by Christian Daniel Rauch in neoclassical style, it is a masterpiece of the Berlin school of sculpture. Until 1950 the bronze statue stood at the front of Unter den Linden avenue, with which it formed an urban ensemble, and since 1963 it has stood at the back of the current location.

== Gallery ==
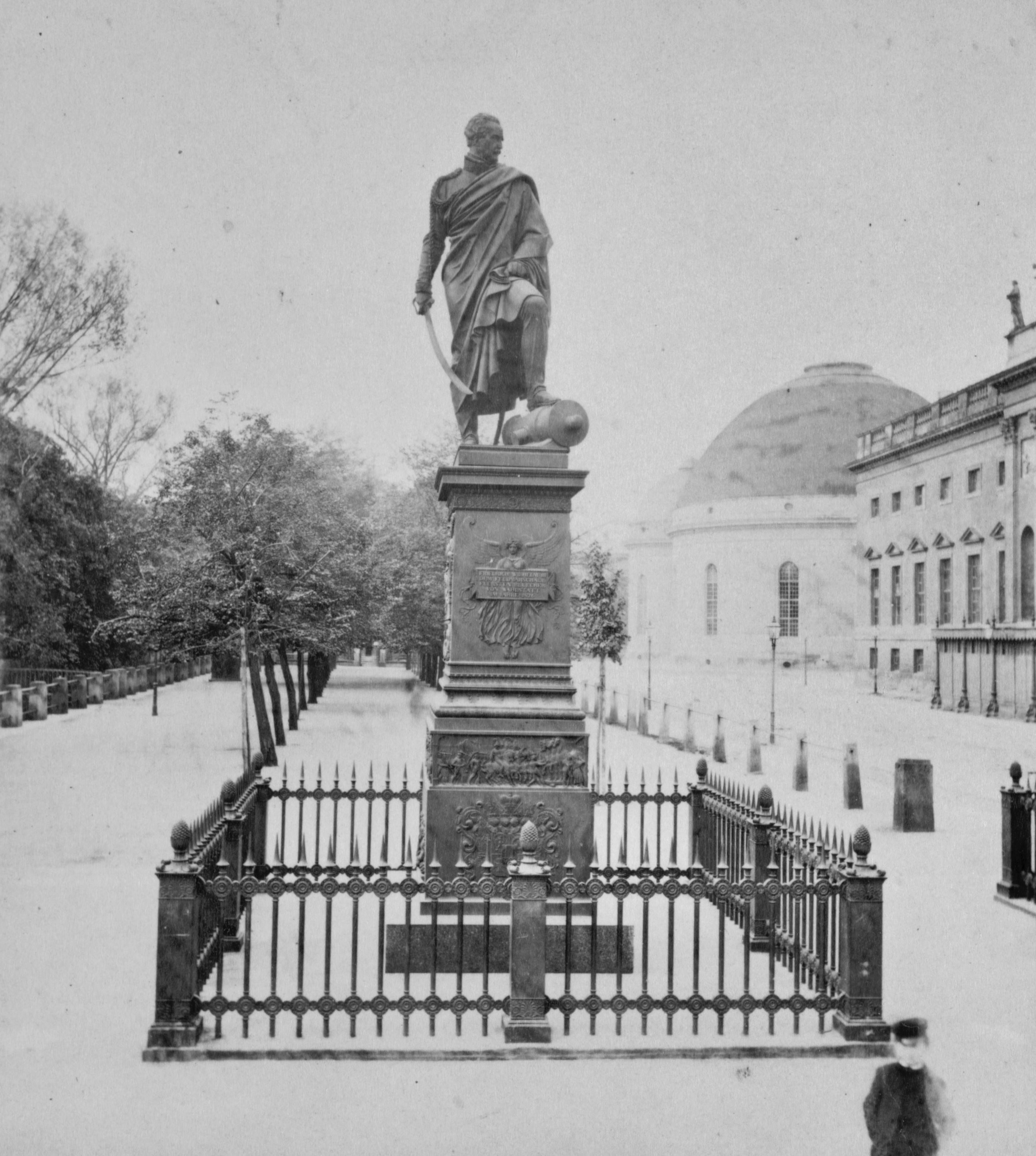
Full view, 1870s

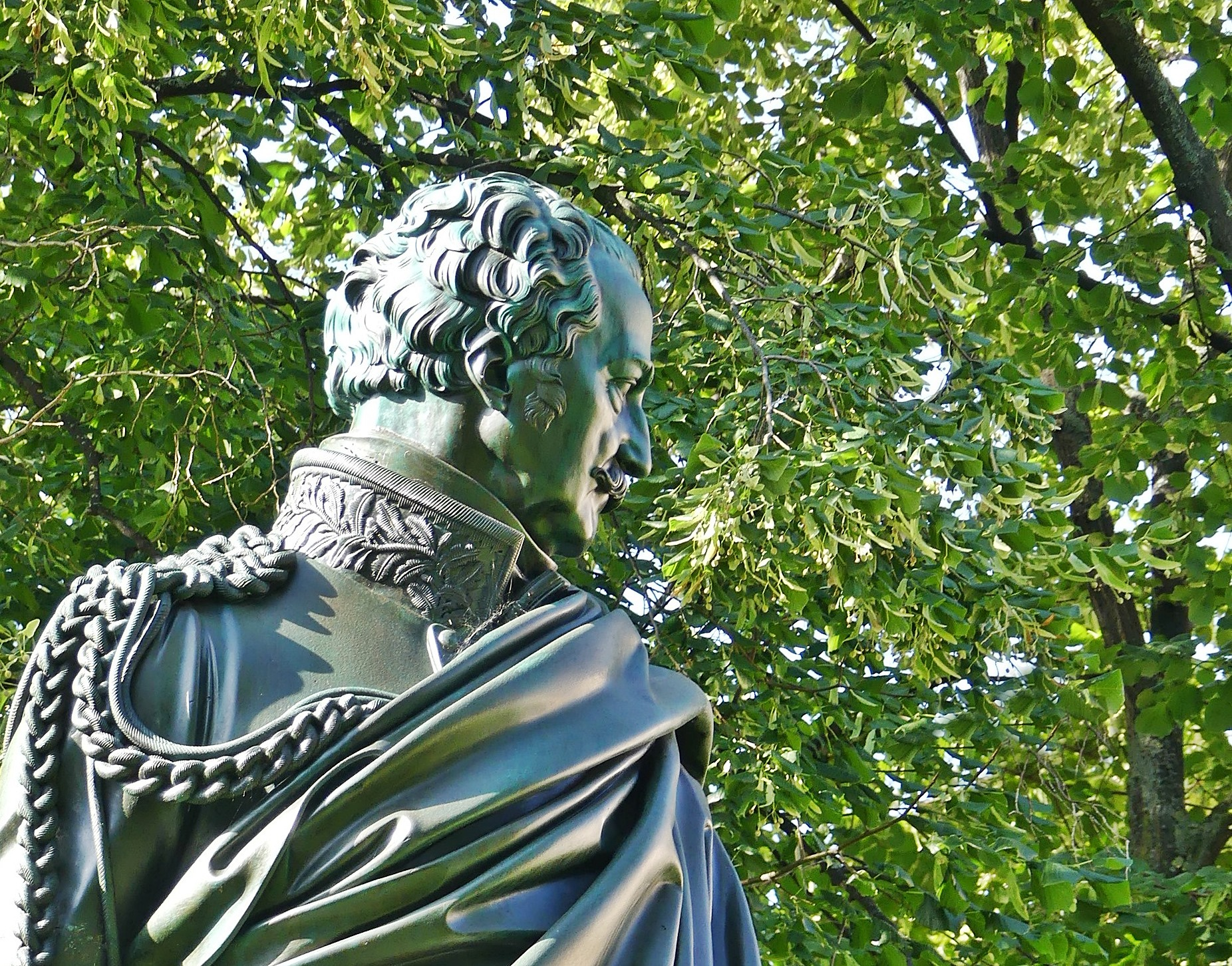
Blücher statue

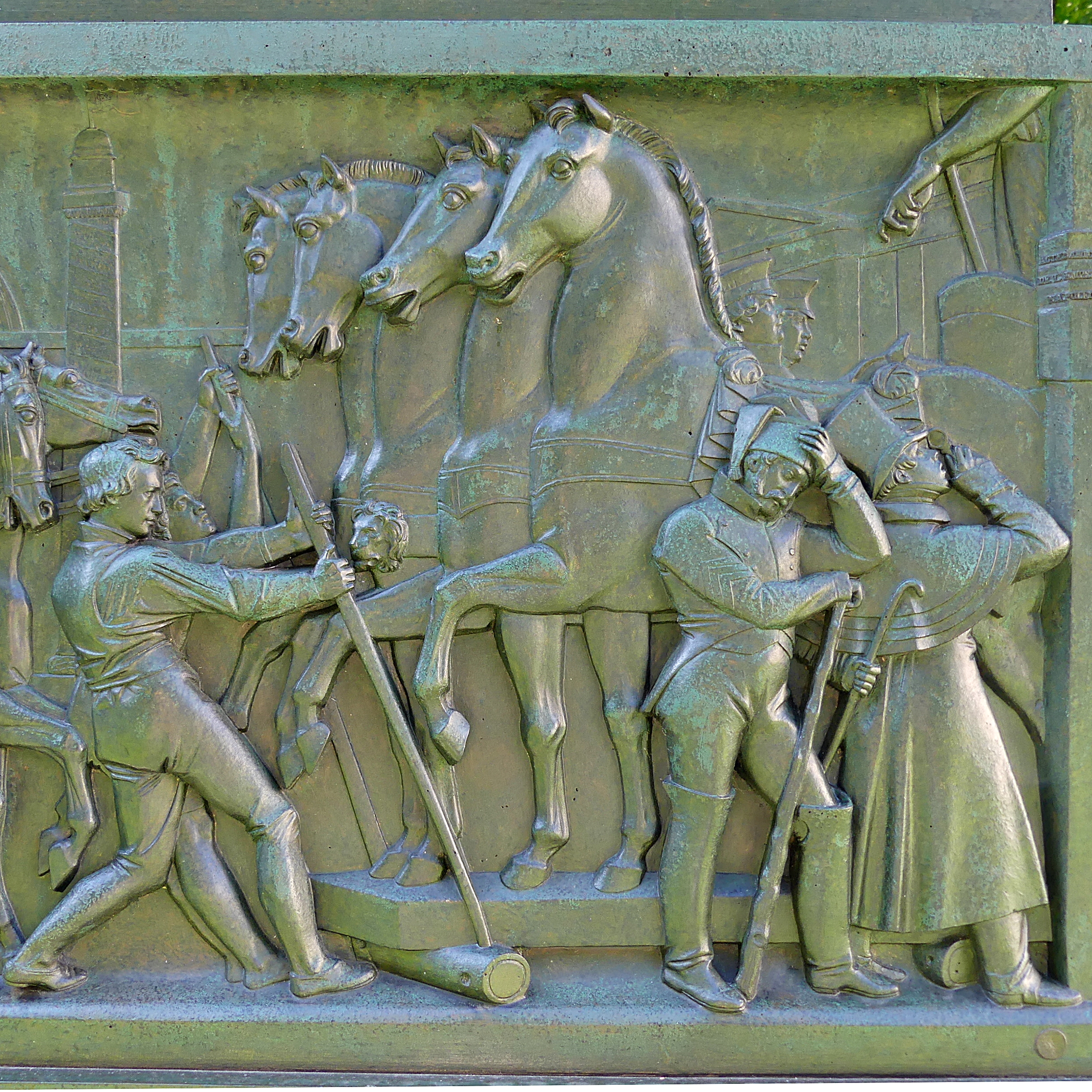
"Return of the Quadriga" relief

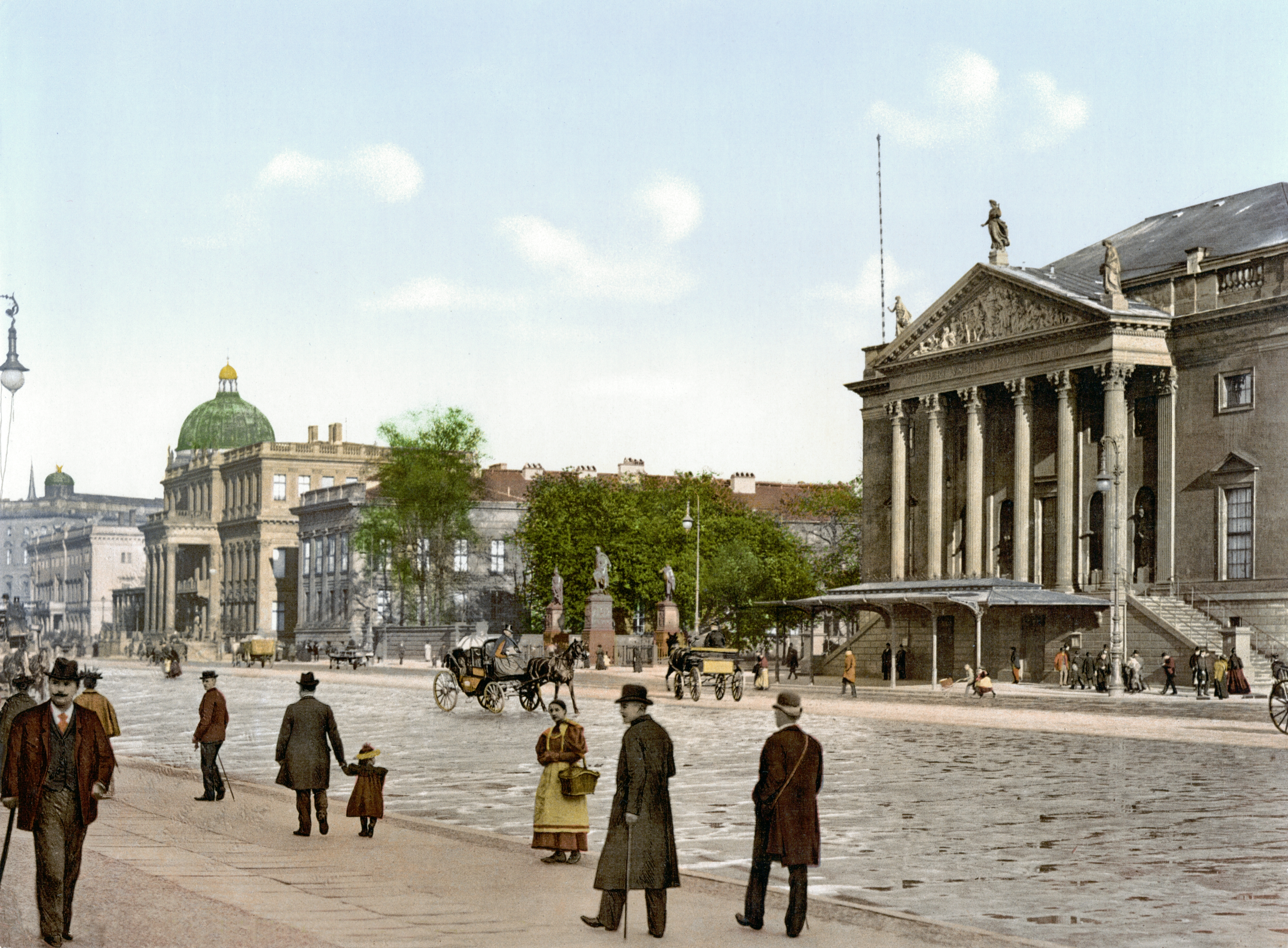
Original location on Unter den Linden

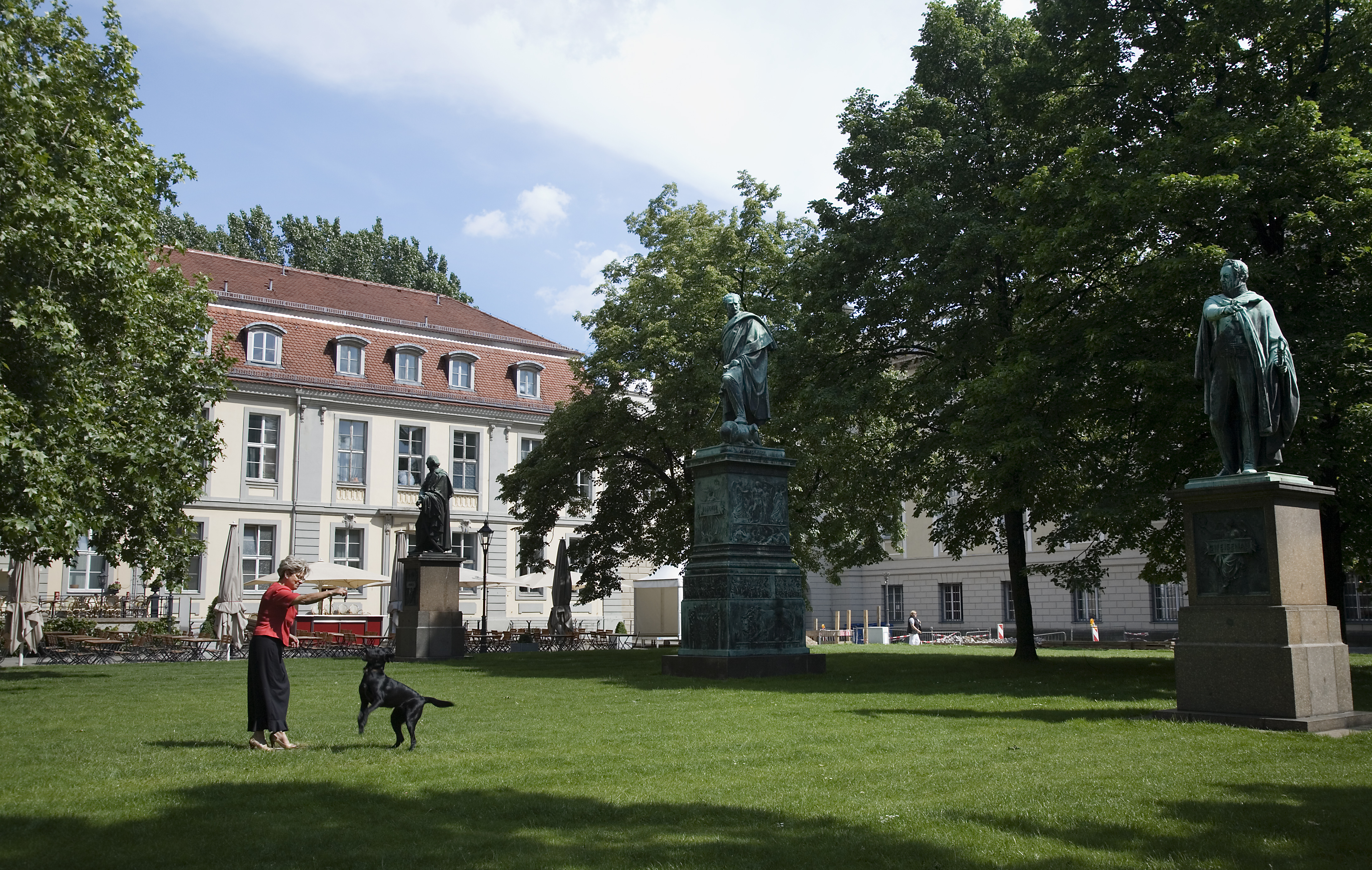
Current location on Bebelplatz

== See also ==
- Gneisenau Memorial, Berlin
- Yorck Memorial, Berlin
