= Yorck Memorial, Berlin =

Yorck Memorial
- Yorck-Denkmal (German)
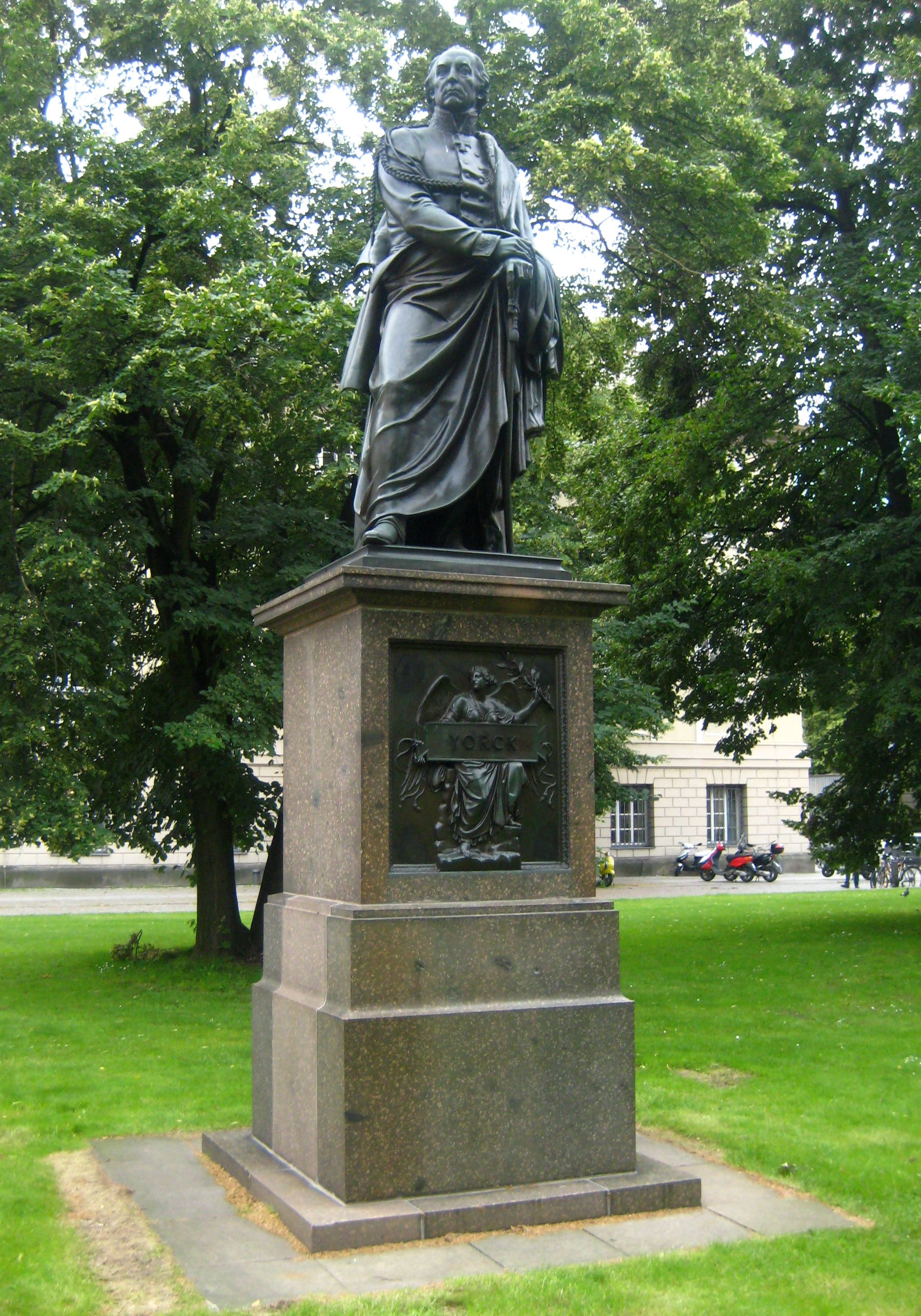
- Artist: Christian Daniel Rauch
- Year: 1855
- Medium: Bronze
- Dimensions: 5.48 m (18.0 ft)
- Location: Bebelplatz, Berlin, Germany

The Yorck Memorial on Bebelplatz green space in Berlin's Mitte district commemorates the Prussian field marshal and freedom fighter Ludwig Yorck von Wartenburg (1759–1830). Created from 1840 to 1855 by Christian Daniel Rauch in neoclassical style, it is a piece of the Berlin school of sculpture. Until 1950 the bronze statue stood at the front of Unter den Linden avenue, with which it formed an urban ensemble, and since 1963 it has stood at the back of Bebelplatz green space.

== Gallery ==
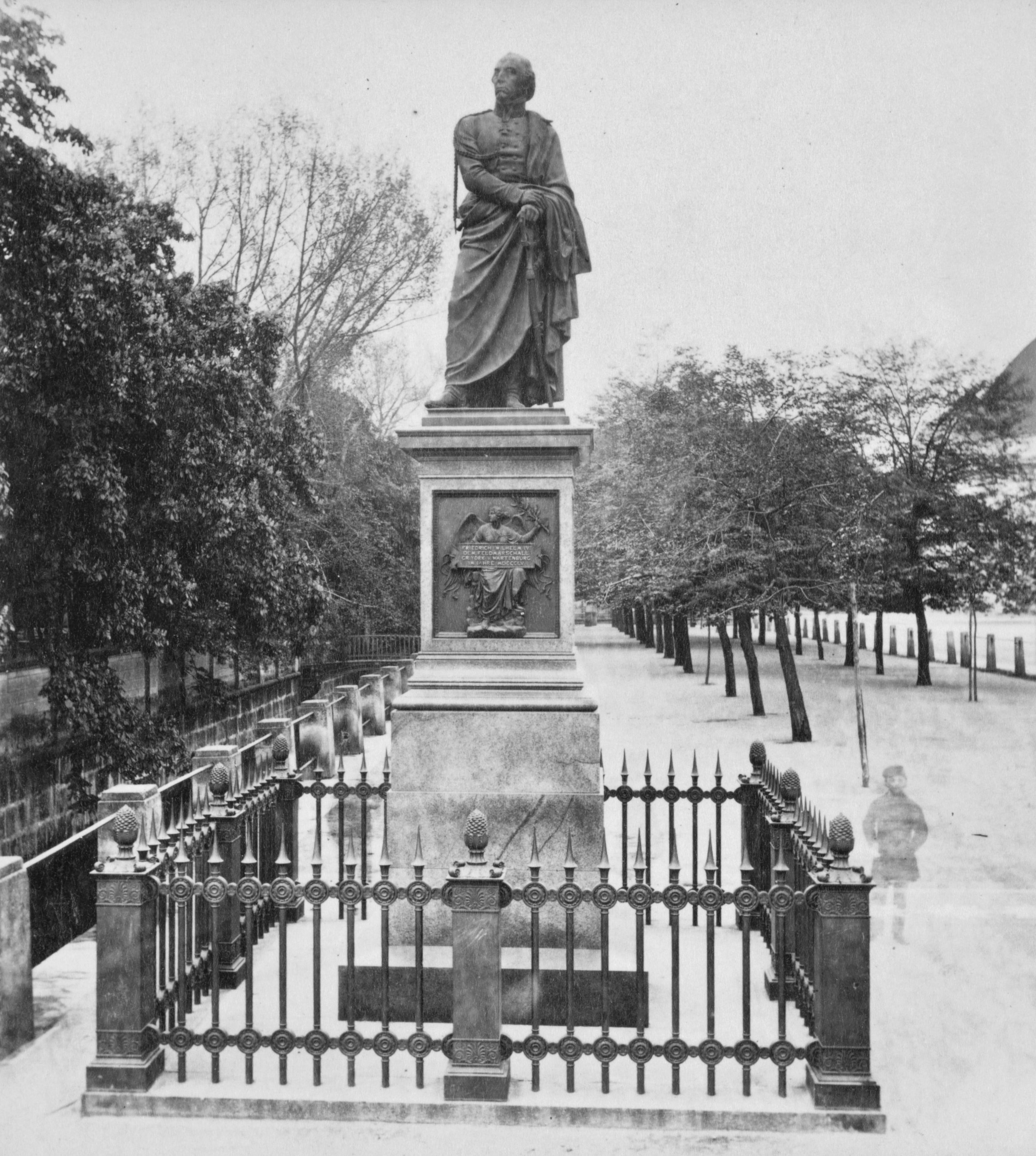
Full view, 1870s

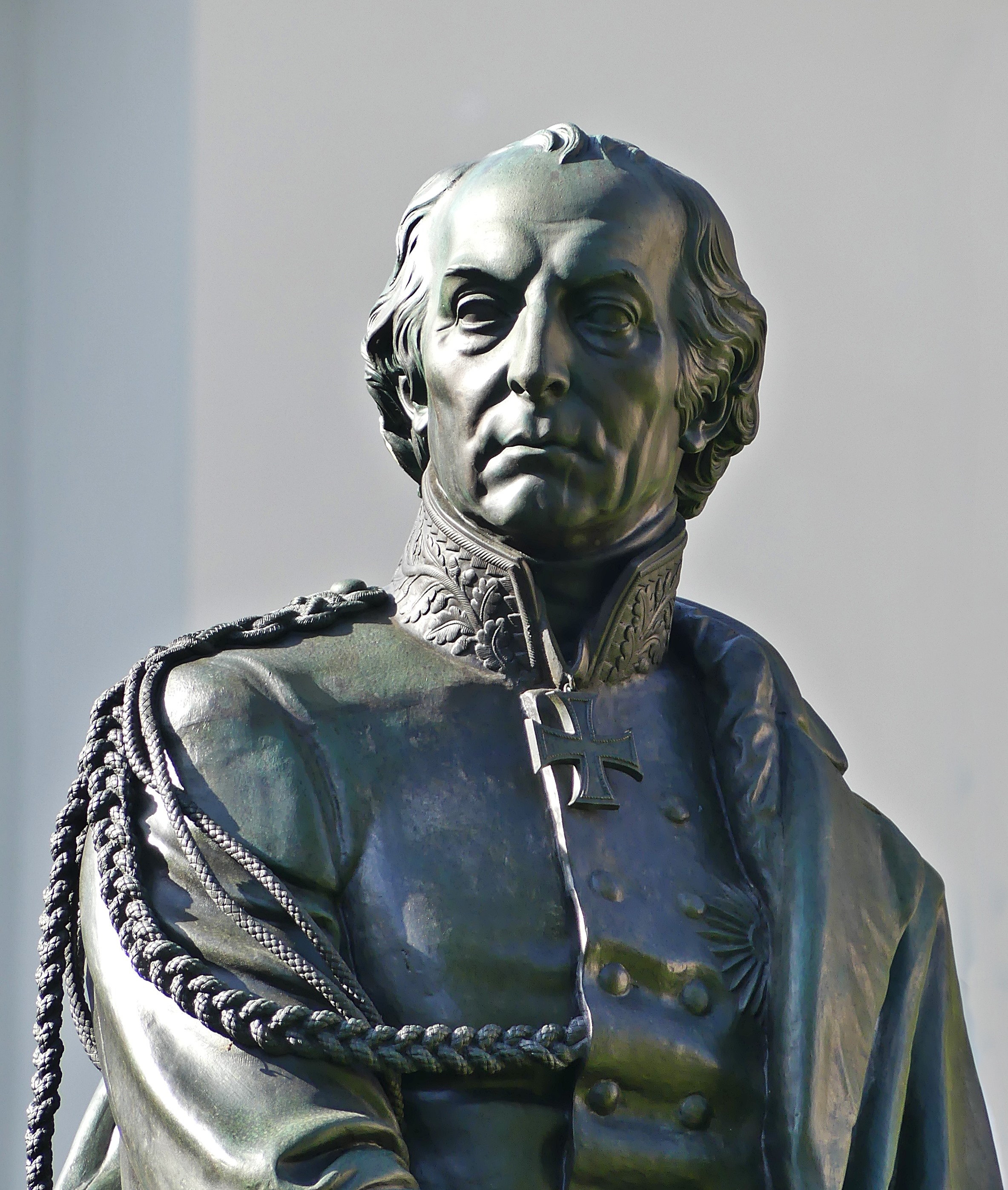
Yorck statue

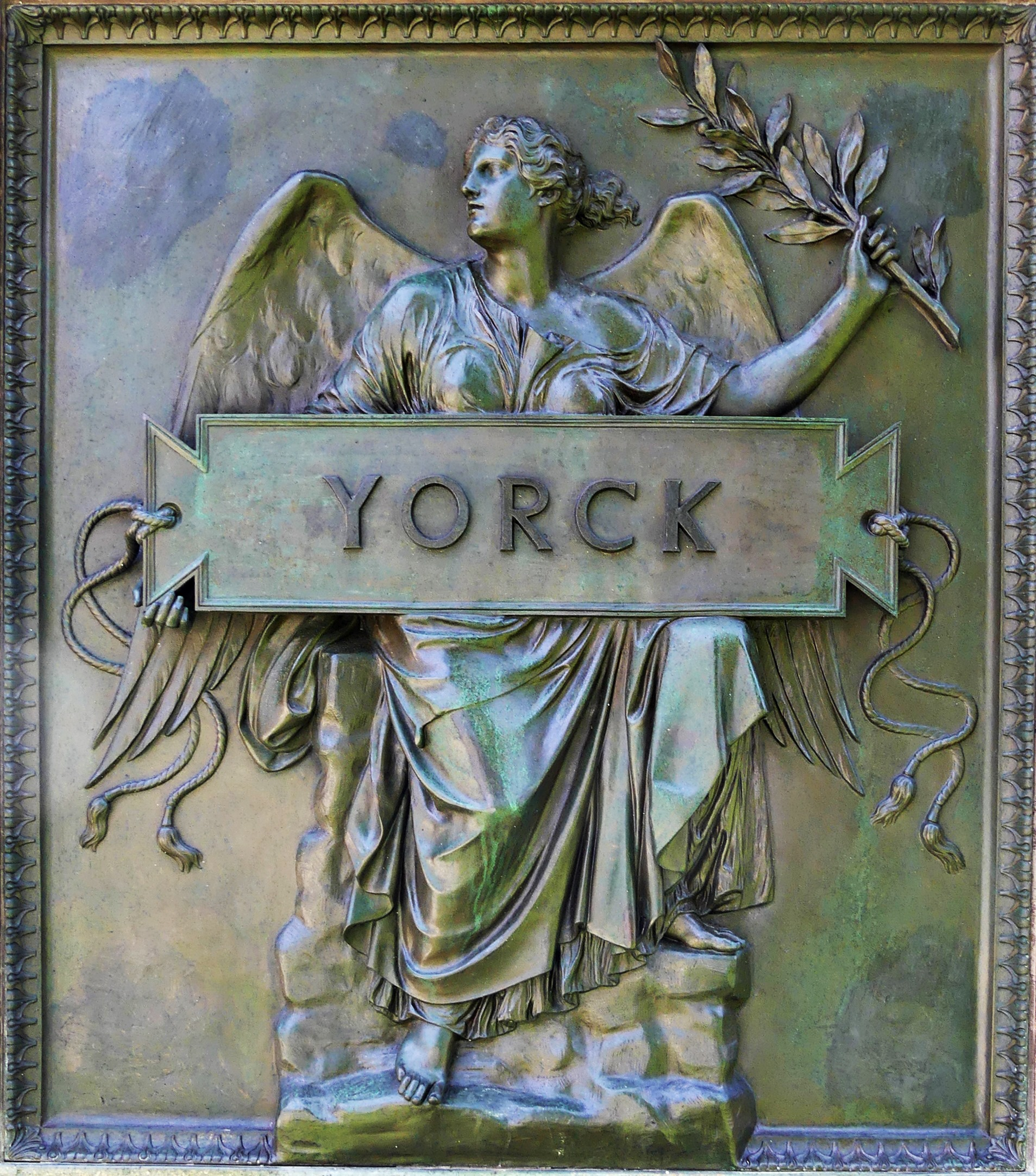
Front relief

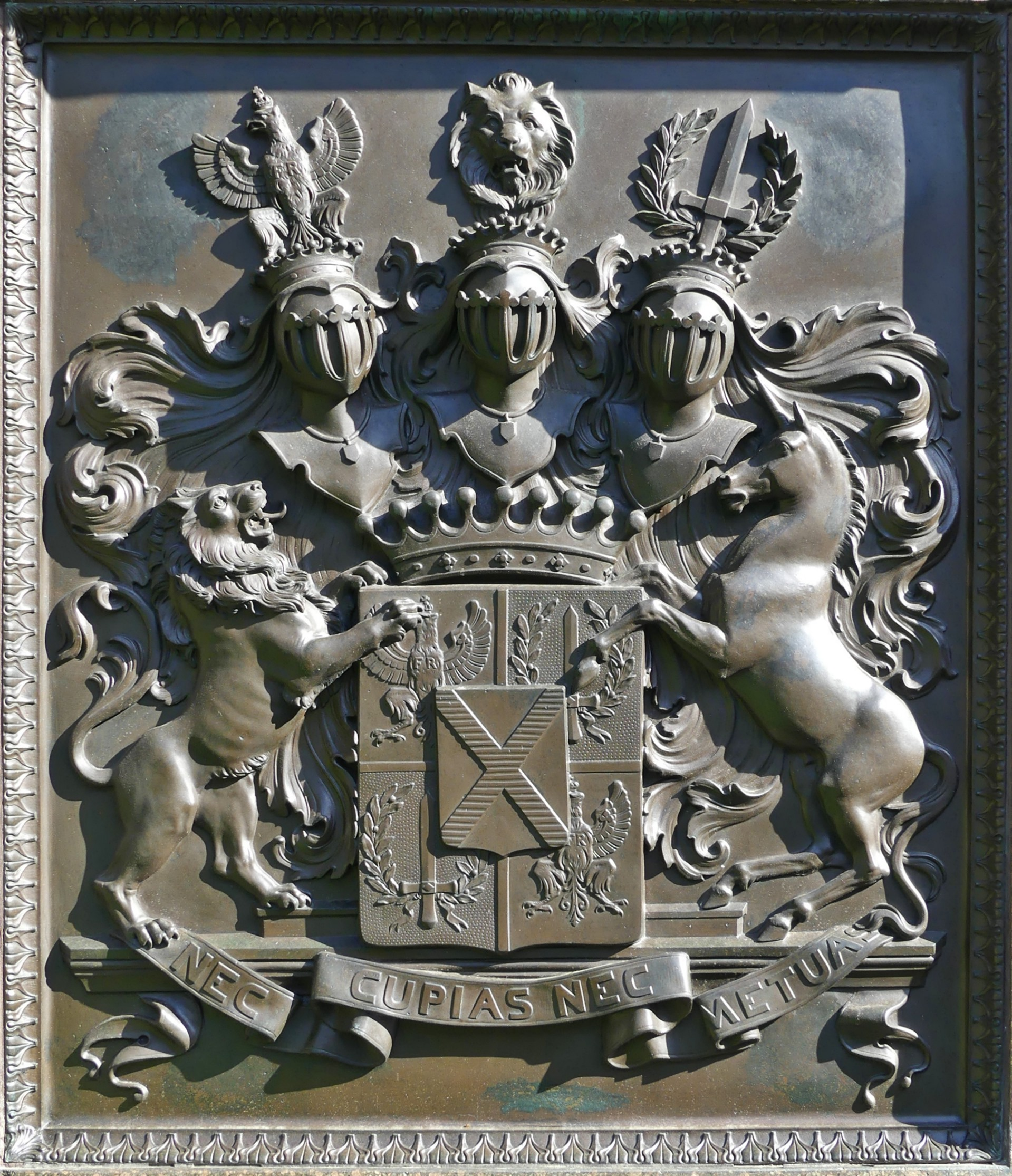
Back relief

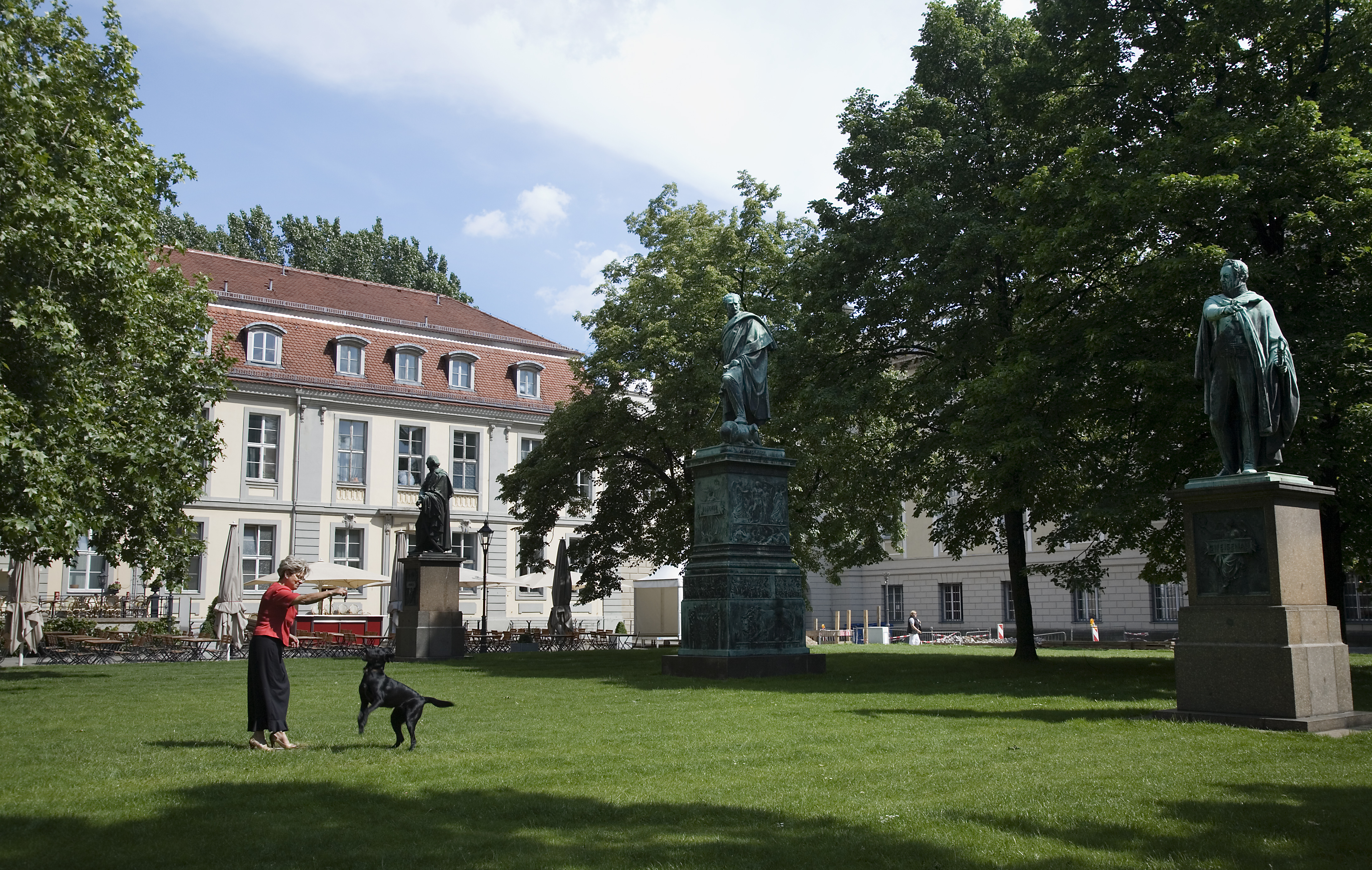
Current location (left)

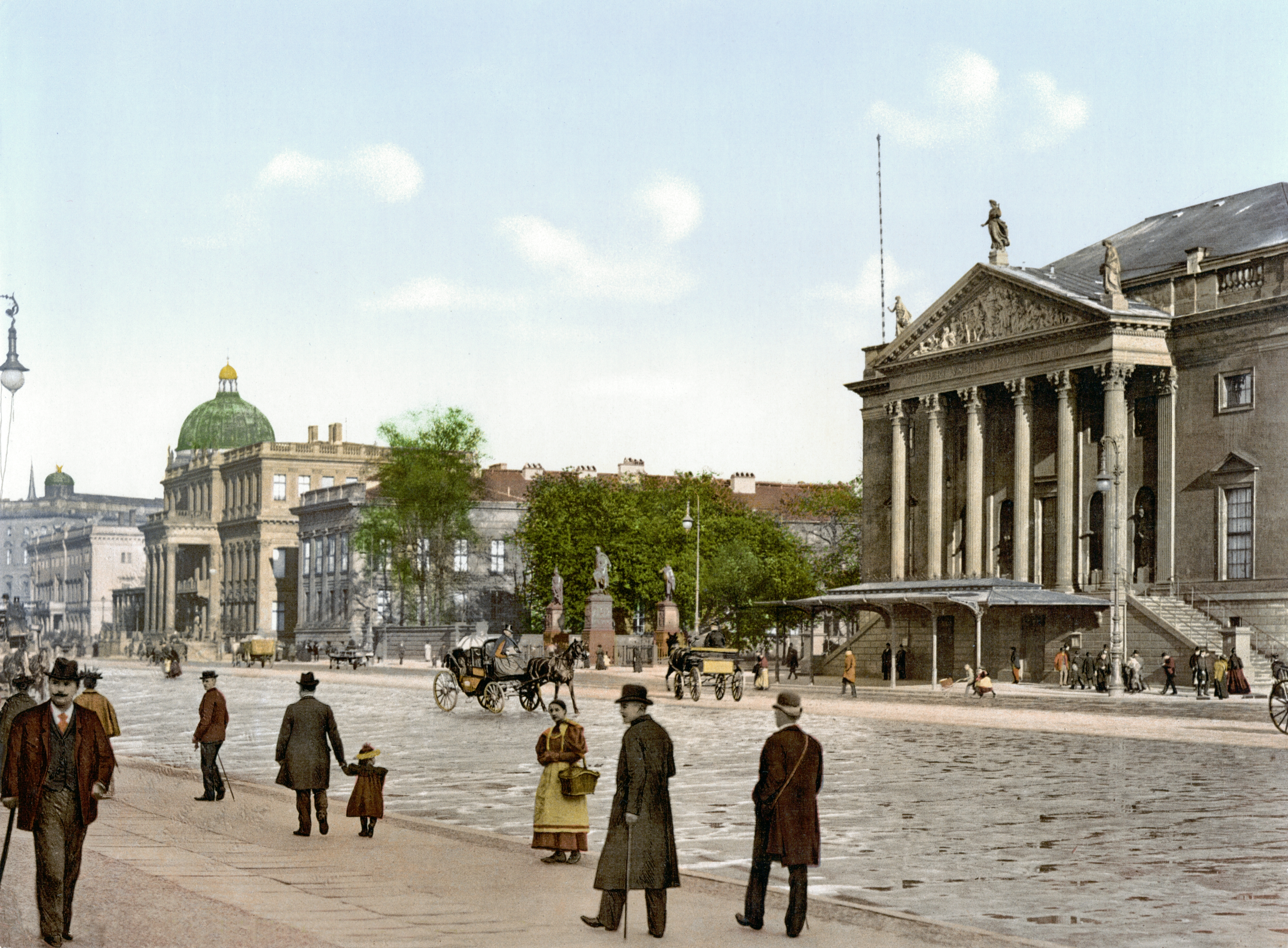
Original location (left)

== See also ==
- Blücher Memorial, Berlin
- Gneisenau Memorial, Berlin
