= Bebelplatz =

Public square in Berlin, formerly named Opernplatz

Coordinates: 52°31′00″N 13°23′38″E

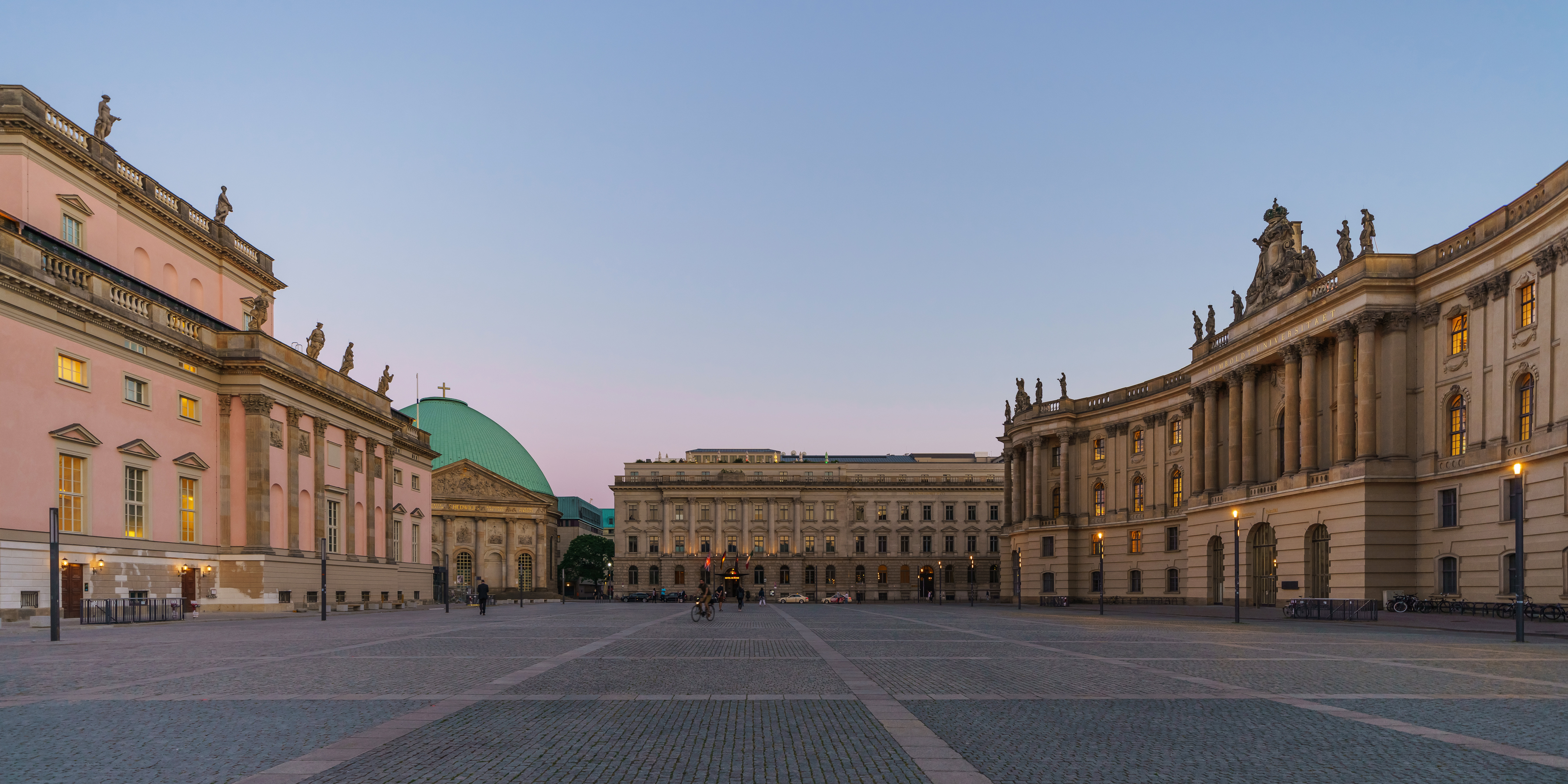
General view of the Bebelplatz, taken from Unter den Linden with the State Opera to the left, St. Hedwig's Cathedral center-left, the Old Library (Alte Bibliothek) of Humboldt University center, and Humboldt's law school to the right

The Bebelplatz (formerly and colloquially the Opernplatz) is a public square in the central Mitte district of Berlin, the capital of Germany. Following World War II, the square was renamed after August Bebel, a founder of the Social Democratic Party of Germany in the 19th century.

The square is located on the south side of the Unter den Linden boulevard, a major east-west thoroughfare that runs through Berlin's city center. It consists of a green area to the east and an open area to the west of the State Opera building, which it surrounds (hence its prewar name). It is bounded to the east by the Prinzessinnenpalais, to the west by the Alte Bibliothek and the Old Palace, and to the southeast by St. Hedwig's Cathedral, the first Catholic church built in Prussia after the Reformation.

== History ==
=== Early history ===
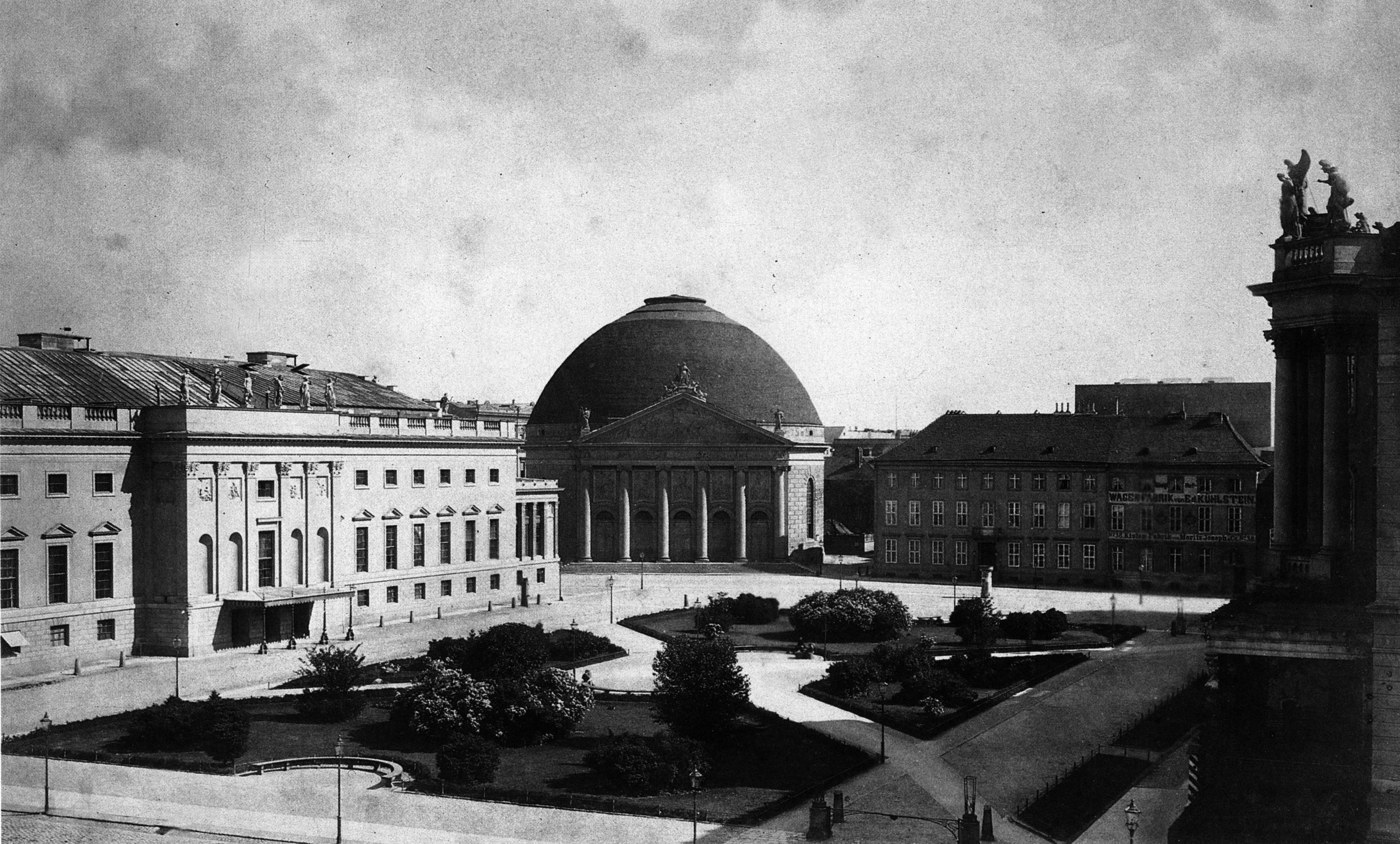
Platz am Opernhaus, c. 1880

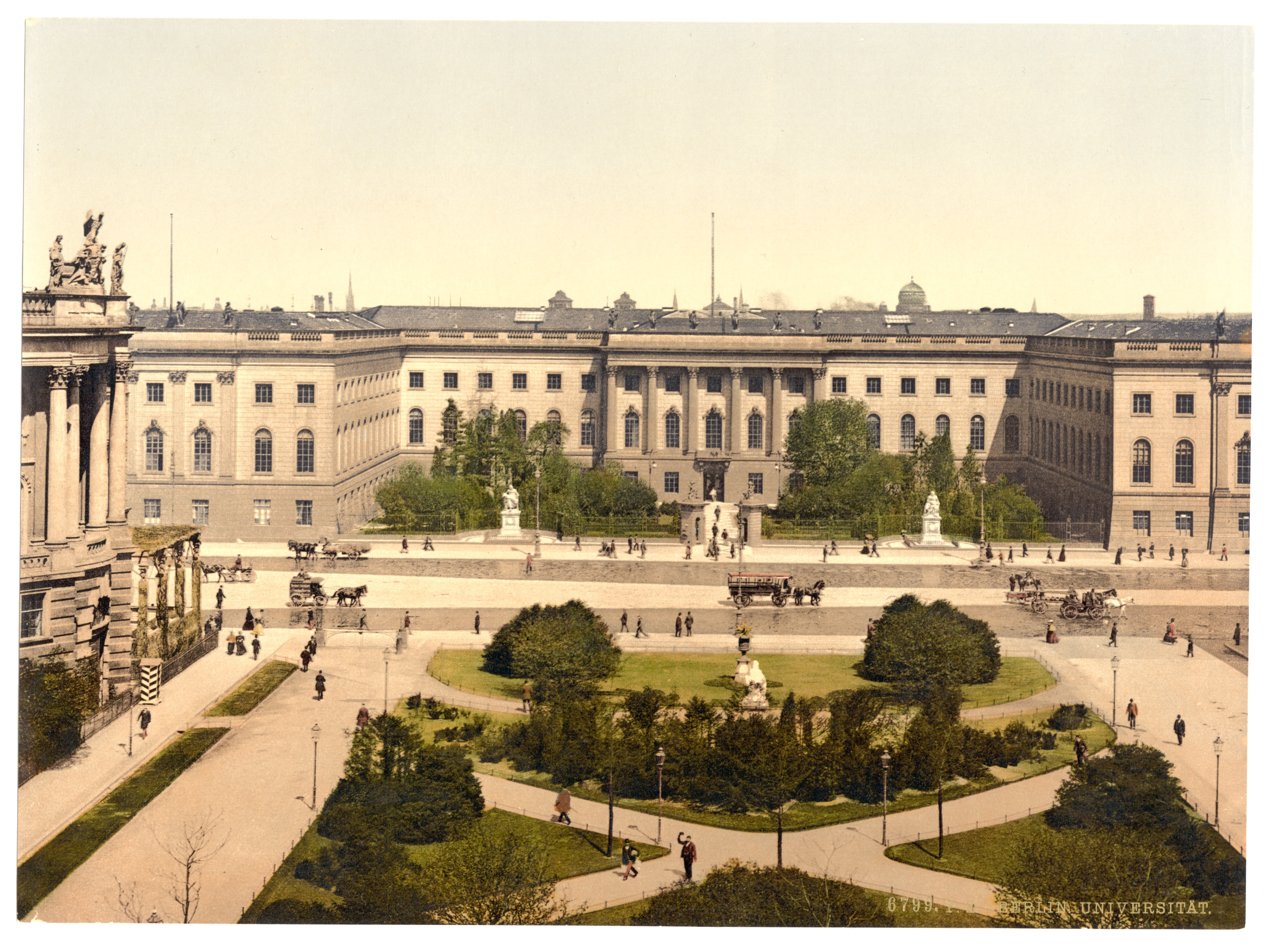
Platz am Opernhaus, from a different perspective, c. 1895

Parts of the fortification of Berlin built in the aftermath of the Thirty Years' War (the baroque Berlin Fortress) were later integrated into the boulevard Unter den Linden when the fortifications had become useless through the advance of artillery pieces. The site of the fortifications is visible until today, as there are no linden trees on this stretch up to the Berlin Palace on the Spree river island itself. The avenue of trees in the direction of the Brandenburg Gate begins where it once began outside the fortifications.

The square, then called Platz am Opernhaus (i.e., square at the opera house), was laid out between 1741 and 1743 under the rule of King Frederick II of Prussia. Frederick "the Great" had planned a much larger Forum Fridericianum, but his distant cousin, Frederick William, Margrave of Brandenburg-Schwedt, refused to sell his palace, the predecessor of today's Old Palace, for demolition. So the king felt compelled to take this house, which was in the middle of his plans, into consideration and to scale these down significantly. In return, however, he forced his cousin to give up his garden and some outbuildings, whereupon the Royal Library was built, which is directly adjacent to the back of the margravial house.

The Opernplatz (today Bebelplatz), which was a bit cramped as a result, has survived almost unchanged: State Opera, St. Hedwig's Cathedral, the Old Library Building and the Palace of Prince Henry, the king's brother, today the main building of Humboldt University, giving the square an almost complete surround of 18th-century buildings.

On 12 August 1910, it was renamed for Emperor Francis Joseph I of Austria (Kaiser-Franz-Josef-Platz) on the occasion of his 80th birthday. The buildings surrounding the square were subsequently largely destroyed in World War II by air raids and the Battle of Berlin. The ensemble was restored in the 1950s, and the square was renamed on 31 August 1947 as Bebelplatz after August Bebel.

=== Nazi book burning ===
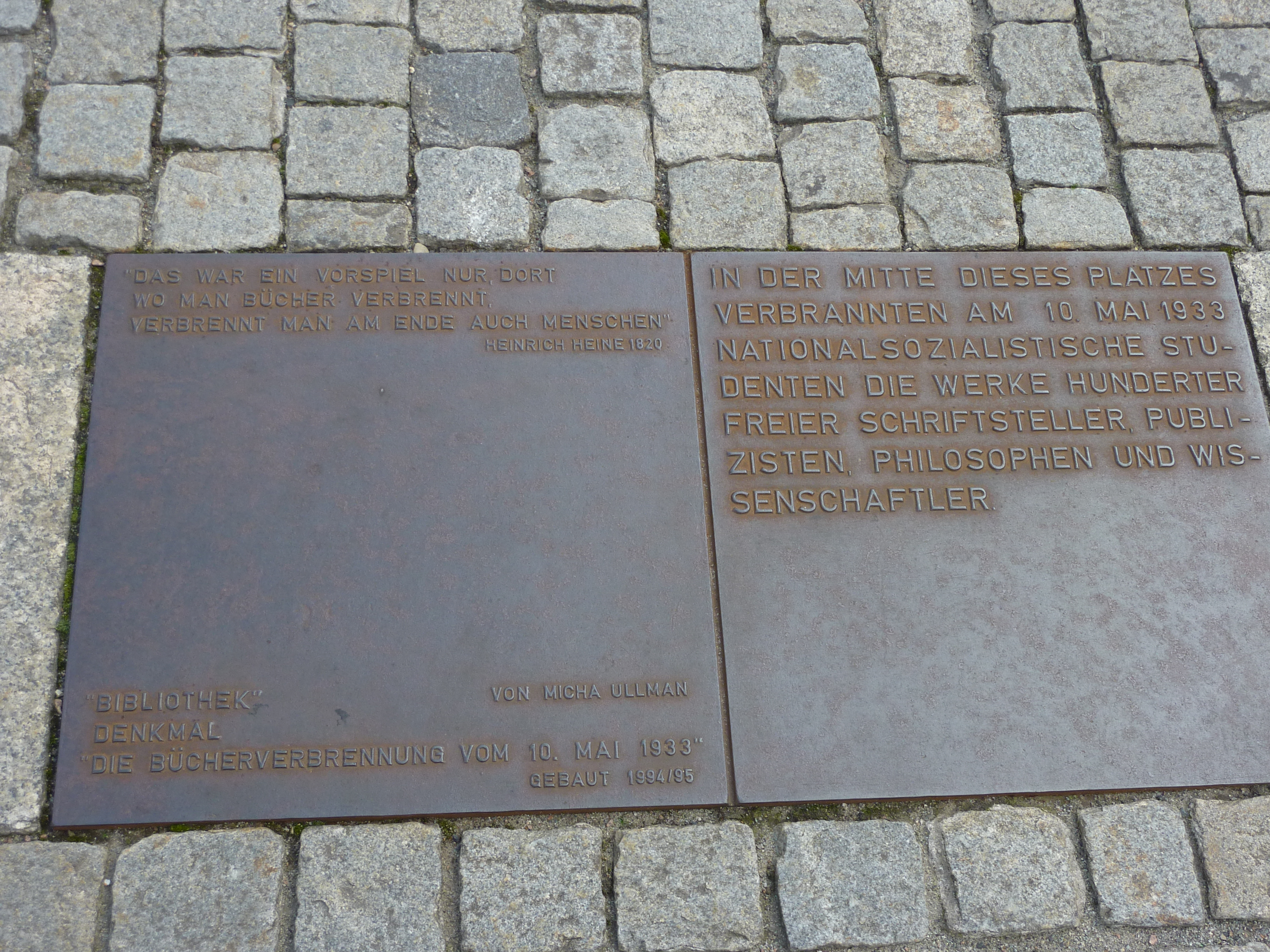
Plaque at Bebelplatz commemorating the 1933 Nazi book burning

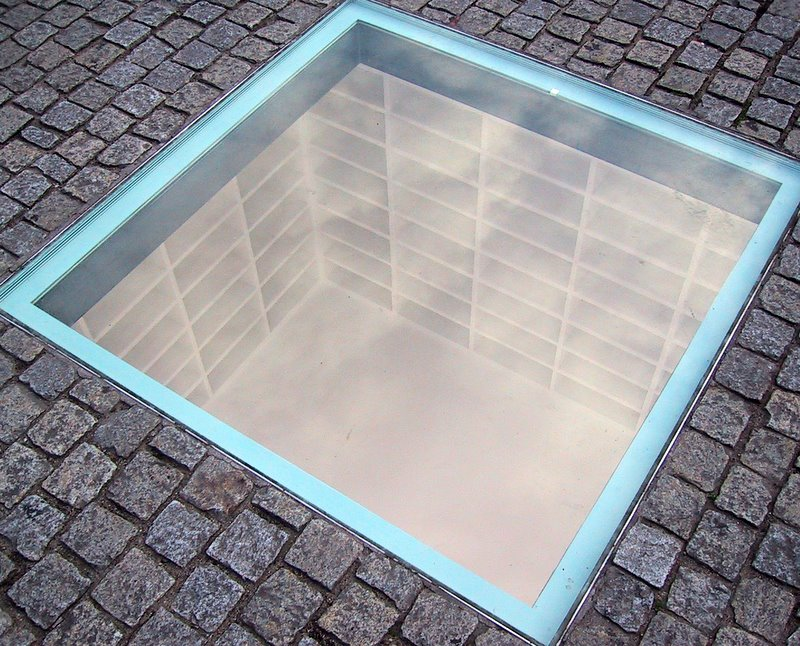
"The Empty Library", a memorial at Bebelplatz commemorating the 1933 Nazi book burning

The Bebelplatz is known as the site of one of the infamous Nazi book burning ceremonies held in the evening of 10 May 1933 in many German university cities. The book burnings were initiated and hosted by the nationalist German Student Association, thus stealing a march on the National Socialist German Students' League. The assembly of the books had started on the sixth, when students dragged the contents of the Institute for the Science of Sexuality library into the square. At the Student Association's invitation, Propaganda Minister Joseph Goebbels held an inflammatory speech before the burning. Besides other spectators, it was attended by members of the Nazi Students' League, the SA ("brownshirts"), SS, and Hitler Youth groups. They burned around 20,000 books, including works by Heinrich Mann, Erich Maria Remarque, Heinrich Heine, Karl Marx, Albert Einstein and many other authors. Erich Kästner, whose books were also among those burned, was present at the scene and described it with bitter irony in his diary.

The Empty Library, a Memorial in memory of the burning of books by Micha Ullman, consisting of a glass plate set into the cobblestones, gives a view of a group of empty bookcases large enough to hold all 20,000 burned books; its purpose is to commemorate the book burning. Furthermore, a line of Heinrich Heine from his play, Almansor (1821), is engraved on a plaque inset in the square: "Das war ein Vorspiel nur, dort wo man Bücher verbrennt, verbrennt man am Ende auch Menschen." (in English: "That was only a prelude; where they burn books, they will in the end also burn people"). Students at Humboldt University hold a book sale in the square every year to mark the anniversary.

=== Recent history ===
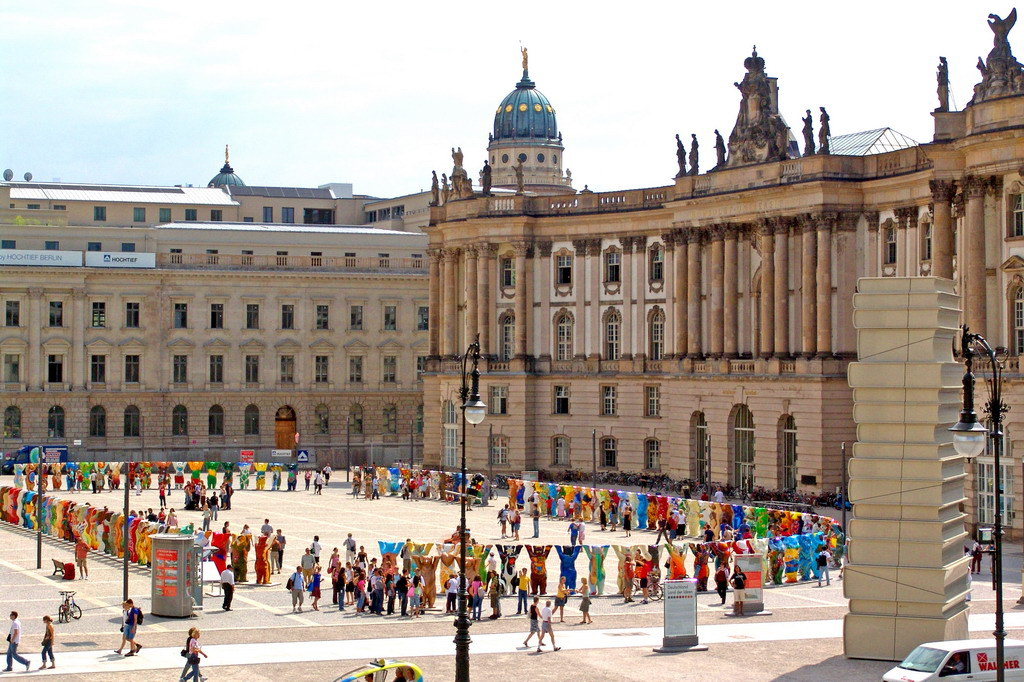
2006 exhibition of United Buddy Bears

In 2006, an exhibition of "United Buddy Bears" was held in the square, for the third time in Berlin. The exhibition consisted of more than 180 bear sculptures, each 2 meters (6 ft 7 in) in height and designed by a different artist. Due to its difficult past, the use of Bebelplatz remains disputed, recently sparked off by a wintry skating rink and a party tent of the Berlin fashion week.

In 2012, several protests were sparked by the announced plan to construct an underground car park serving the opera attendees beneath the square and around the subsurface memorial.

== See also ==
- Blücher Memorial, Berlin
- Bülow Memorial, Berlin
- Gneisenau Memorial, Berlin
- Scharnhorst Memorial, Berlin
- Yorck Memorial, Berlin
