= Architectural ensemble =

Group of multiple related objects, such as buildings

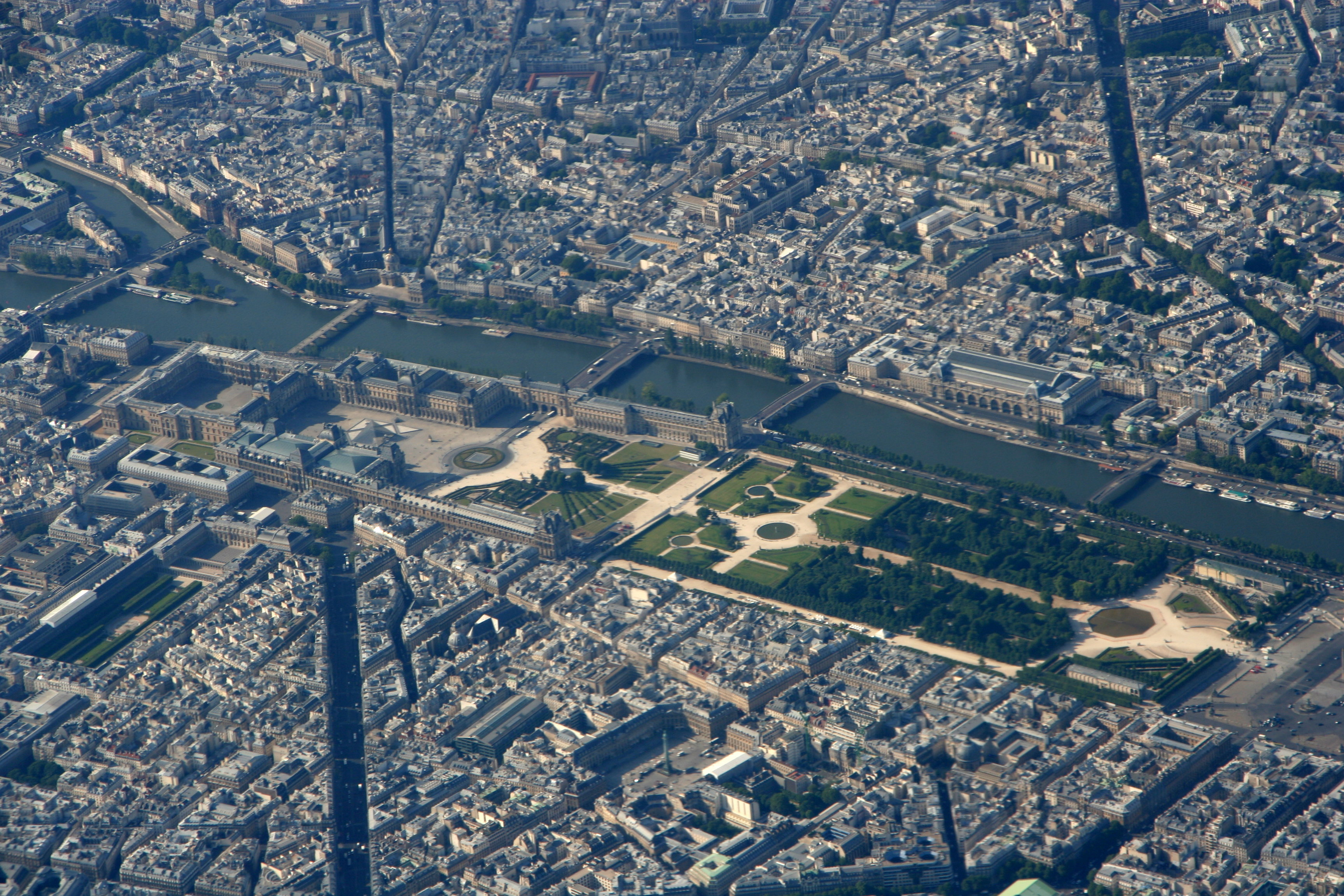

The architectural ensemble (from the French: ensemble - integrity, connectedness, unity) is a harmonious unity of the spatial composition of buildings, engineering structures (bridges, embankments, etc.), works of monumental painting, sculpture and landscape gardening art. The image of the architectural ensemble depends on the change of lighting, season, the presence of people. An important element of the ensemble can serve as a landscape. In this case, the topography (for example, churches that were built on the high bank of the river) can play a key role. Very often, architectural ensembles include ponds.

There are architectural ensembles created at a time, according to a single plan, and ensembles that take shape over the years, the efforts of many architects, carefully complementing the emerging composition so that new elements are organically combined with old ones. Classical examples of such ensembles include St. Mark's Square in Venice and Palace Square in St. Petersburg. The German term is Bauensemble.

== Literature ==
- Bundesministerium für Unterricht, Kunst und Kultur (BMUKK), Bundesdenkmalamt (BDA): Standards Für Ensemble-Unterschutzstellungen. BMUKK-GZ 13.600/0030-IV/3/2013, Stand: 19. November 2013 – erarbeitet im Rahmen eines mehrphasigen Pilotprojektes zum Thema UNESCO-Welterbe – Ensembleschutz, Neue Wege der Zusammenarbeit zum Nutzen der Bürgerinnen und Bürger (bda.at; betrifft Österreich).
