= Großer Stern =

Square in Berlin, Germany

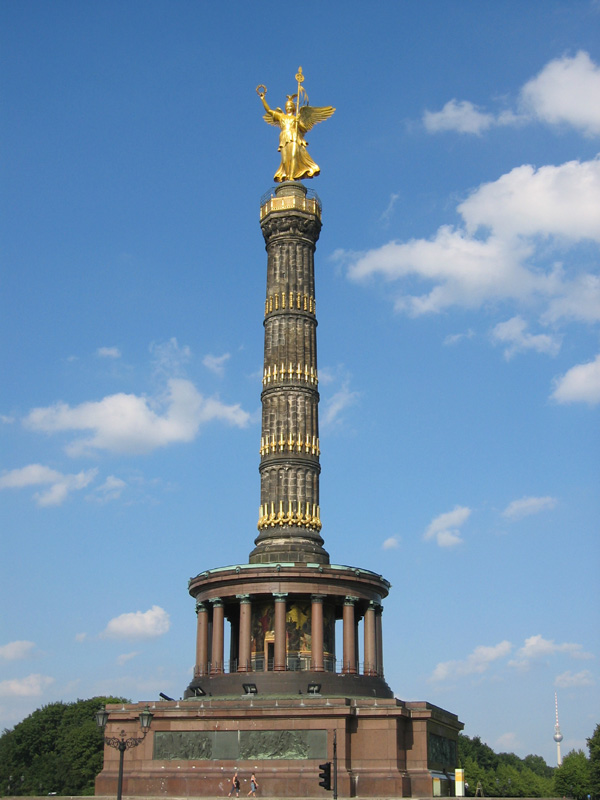
- The Victory Column in the square
- Interactive map of Großer Stern
- Namesake: Hunting star
- Type: Public square
- Location: Berlin, Germany
- Quarter: Tiergarten
- Nearest metro station: Brandenburger Tor; Tiergarten
- Coordinates: 52°30′52″N 13°21′00″E
- Major junctions: Straße des 17. Juni; Spreeweg; Altonaer Straße; Hofjägerallee

Construction
- Inauguration: c. 1698

Other
- Known for: Bismarck Memorial; Moltke statue; Roon statue; Victory Column

Der Große Stern (transl. The Great Star) is the central square of the Großer Tiergarten park in Berlin; the Berlin Victory Column is sited in it. It is crossed by the Straße des 17. Juni, at its half.

The other three streets at the junction are:

- Helmut-Kohl-Allee;
- Altonaer Straße;
- Spreeweg.

In 2018, Greenpeace activists poured 3500 liters of yellow paint on the road, making it resemble a sun in protest of the government's use of coal power plants.
