= Platz der Republik (Berlin) =

Public square in Berlin, Germany

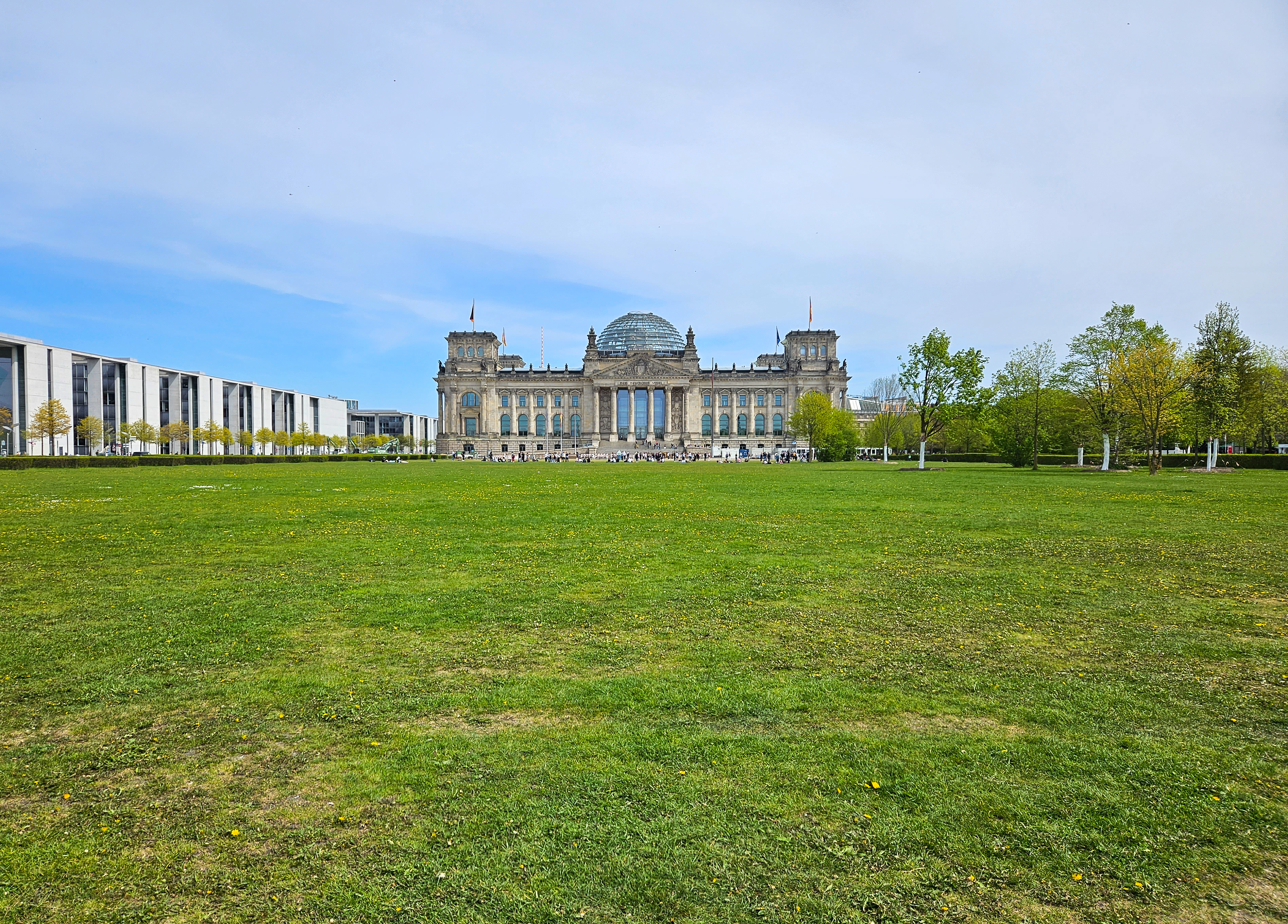
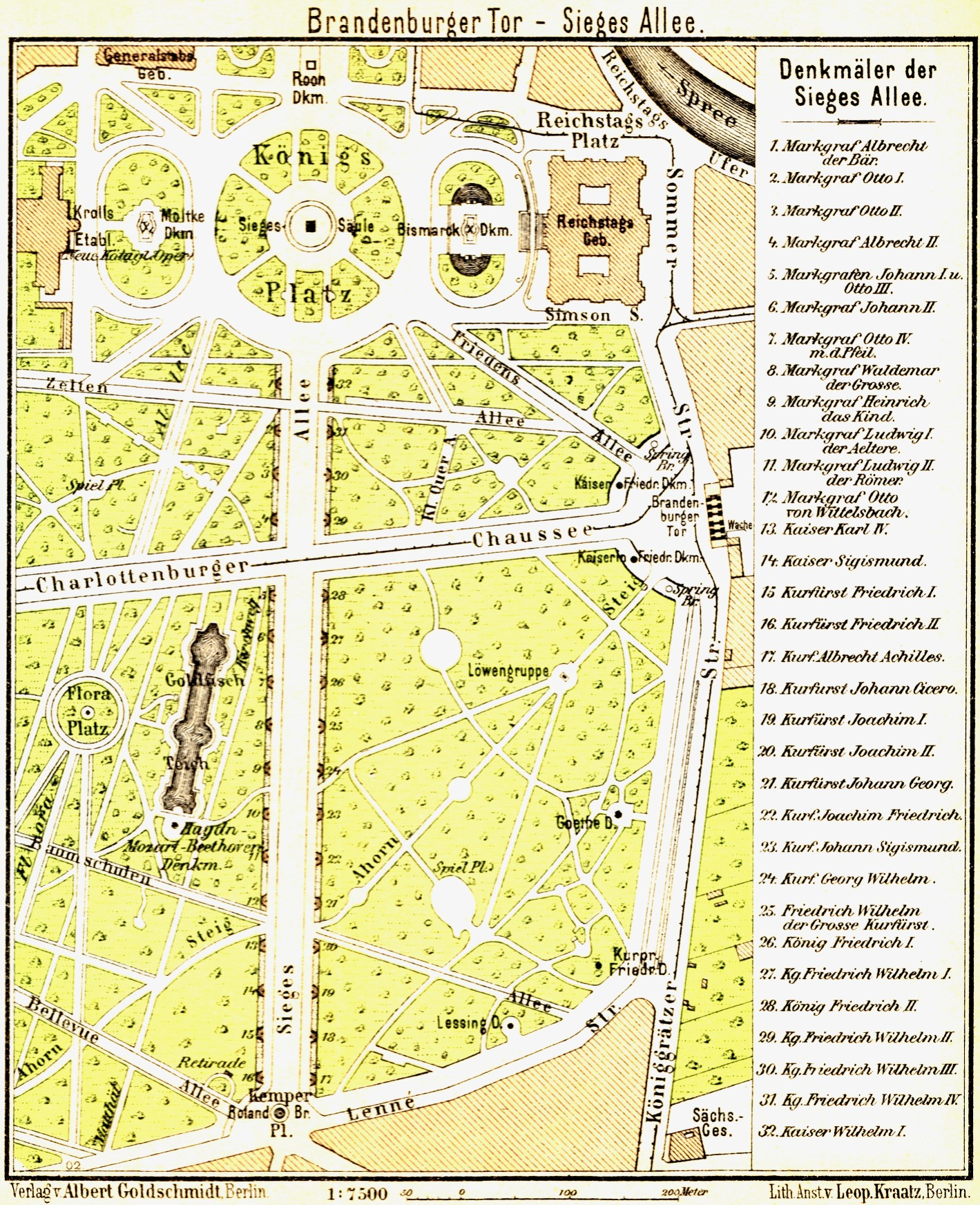
- Platz der Republik with Reichstag building and Paul Löbe House in the background Map of the Königsplatz and Siegesallee, 1902
- Interactive map of Platz der Republik
- Former names: Exerzierplatz vor dem Brandenburger Tor; (1730–1865); Königsplatz; (1865–1926; 1933–1948)
- Type: Public square
- Location: Berlin, Germany
- Quarter: Tiergarten
- Nearest metro station: Bundestag
- Coordinates: 52°31′07″N 13°22′21″E
- Major junctions: Paul-Löbe-Allee; Heinrich-von-Gagern-Straße; Scheidemannstraße

Platz der Republik (German: [ˈplats deːɐ̯ ʁepuˈbliːk], Republic Square) is a square in Berlin, Germany. It is located in the Tiergarten (borough Mitte), directly in front (west) of the Reichstag building. The square has an area of about 36,900 square meters and is almost completely covered by grass but is decorated with some hedges and a few trees.

Before 1926 and between 1933 and 1948 it was called Königsplatz (German: [ˈkøːnɪçsˌplats], King's Square). The Victory Column stood here before it was moved to its present location in 1939. Also the Bismarck Memorial was located here until 1938.

== History ==
The square was created in about 1735 and was used under King Frederick William I as parade-ground, a sandy field then known as "Exerzierplatz vor dem Brandenburger Tor". In 1844 the Kroll Opera House was built on its west end, and in 1867 it was turned into a city square named "Königsplatz".

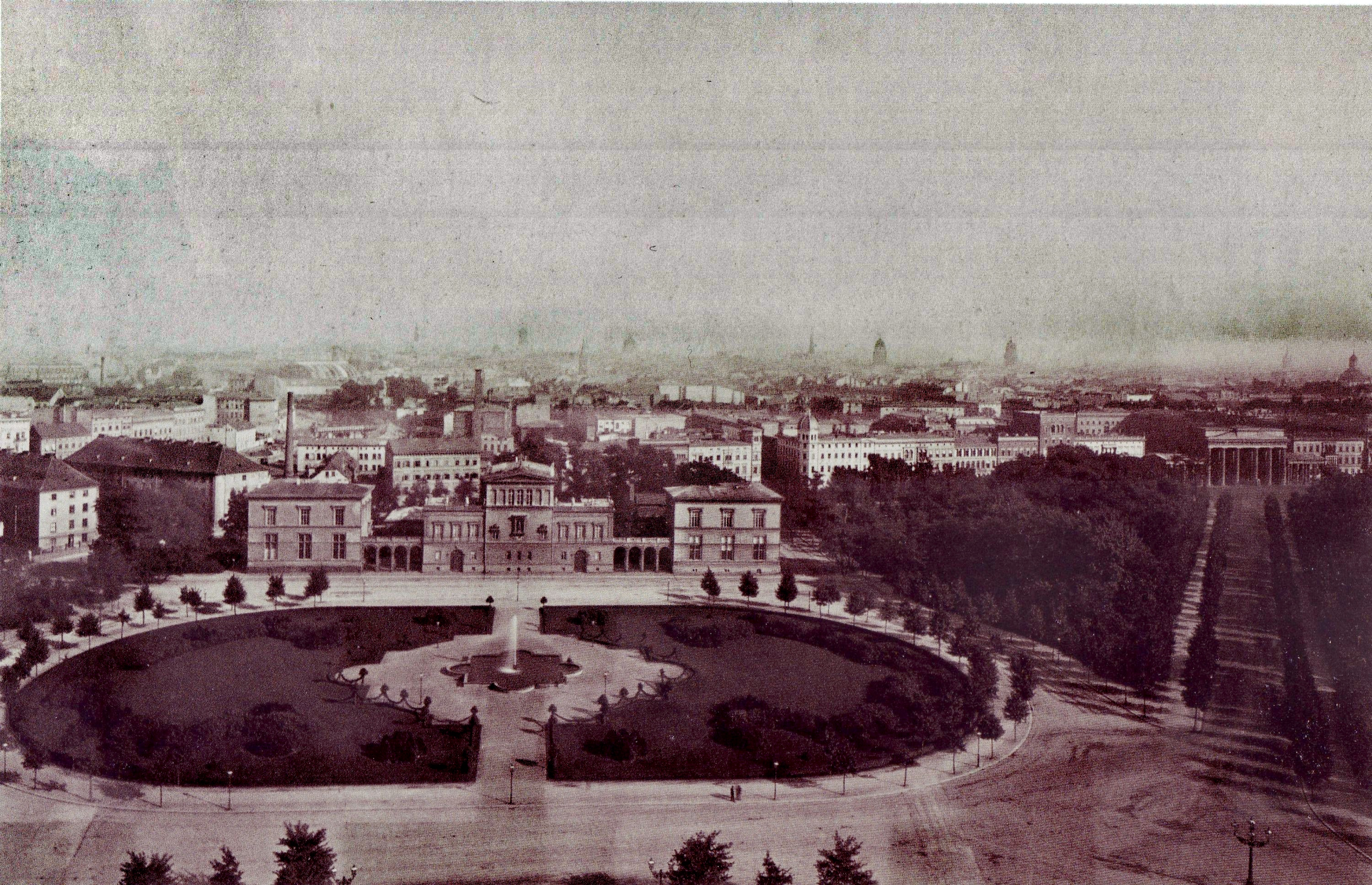
Eastern portion of the Königsplatz with the Palais Raczynski. Photographed from the Victory Column, about 1880

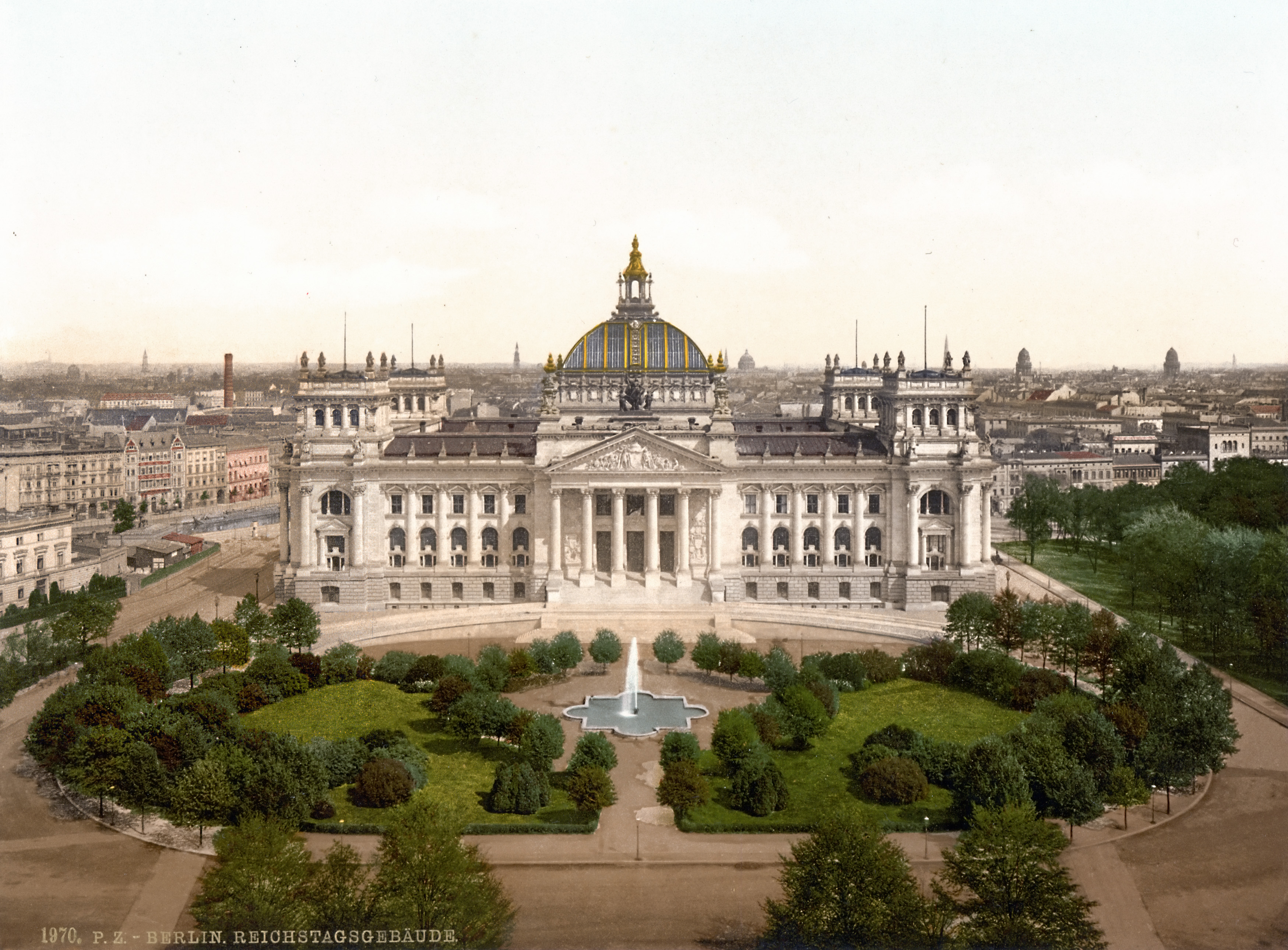
Eastern portion of the Königsplatz with the newly built Reichstag building, about 1894

In 1873 the Victory Column was erected in the center of the square, at the end of the newly created Siegesallee boulevard. At the east end of the square stood the Palais of the Polish-Prussian count Atanazy Raczyński, before the Reichstag building was built there from 1884 to 1894.

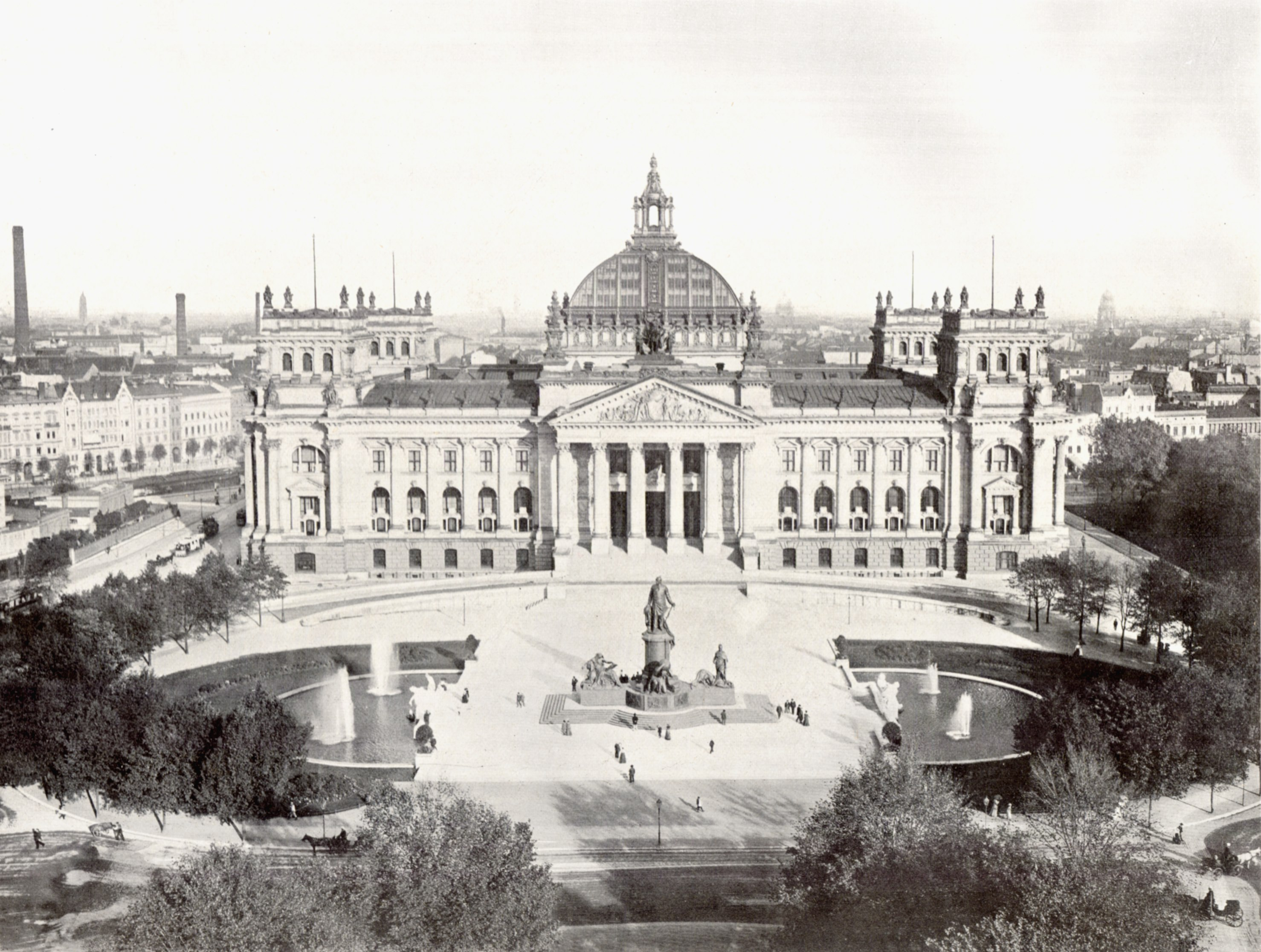
Königsplatz with the newly built Bismarck Memorial, about 1900

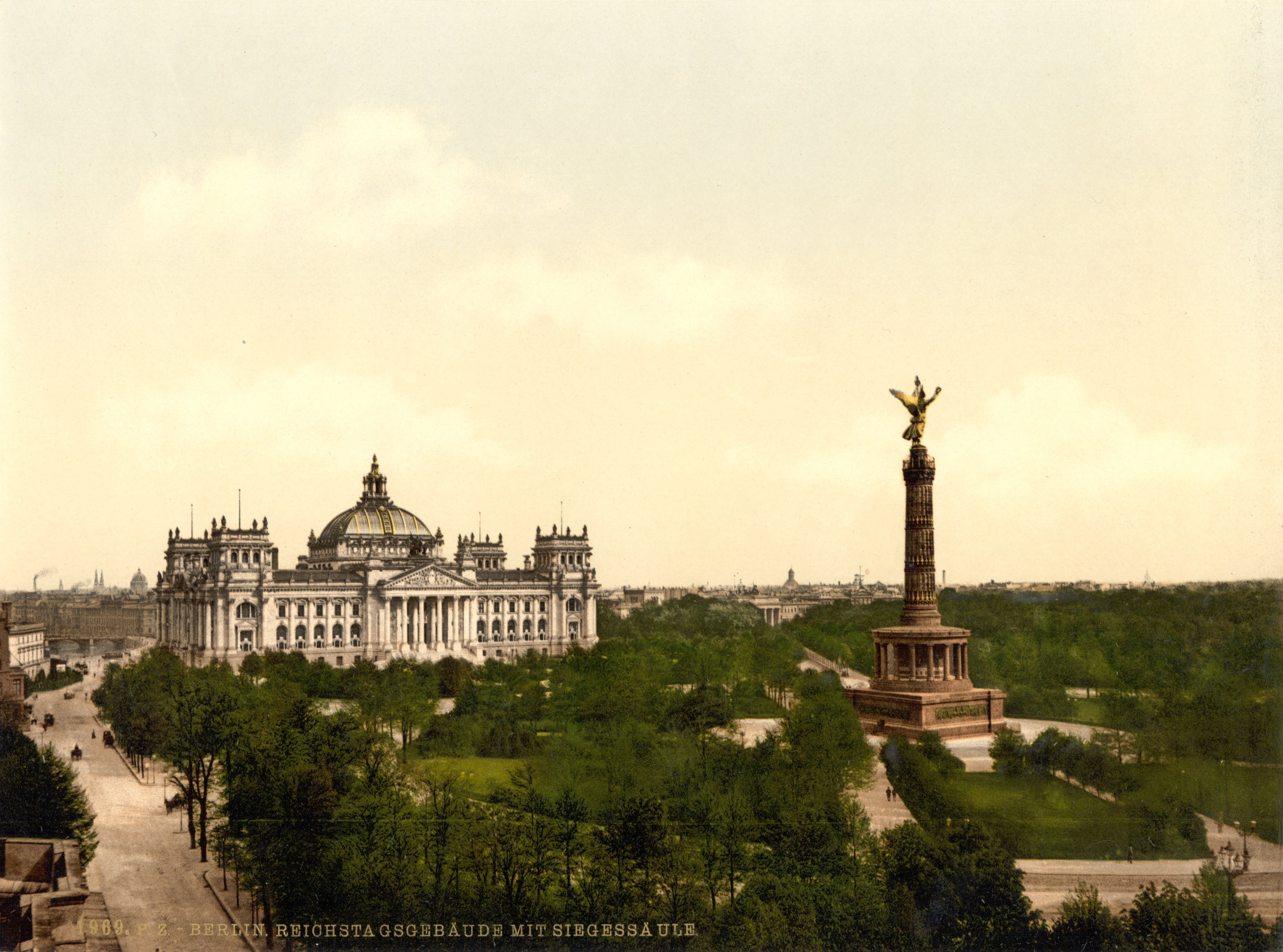
Königsplatz, with the Reichstag and the Victory Column, about 1900

During the Weimar Republic, the square was named "Platz der Republik" to commemorate the abolition of the monarchy. When the Nazis took power in 1933, the square was renamed "Königsplatz". As part of a grandiose plan to create a "Welthauptstadt Germania", the Victory Column was enlarged and moved to its present location in 1939. Also the Bismarck Memorial was moved in 1938. World War II ended in 1945 and in 1948 the square returned to the name "Platz der Republik". The Kroll Opera, severely damaged in the war, was finally demolished in 1951.

In the Cold War era, the square was part of West Berlin. The Berlin Wall ran past the back side of the Reichstag. The square, now a large lawn, was thus far away from traffic and was used as a recreational area for weekend barbecues etc. After German reunification in 1990 the square regained its position of central importance in Berlin. A large German flag was raised on the square in the night from 2 to 3 October 1990.

In 1991 the German Bundestag decided that Berlin would again be the seat of government and parliament during the Hauptstadtbeschlus (Decision on the Capital of Germany). The renovation of the Reichstag building was completed in 1999.

== Events ==
In the autumn of 1948, the square saw a huge demonstration protesting against the Berlin Blockade. About 300,000 people participated, and mayor Ernst Reuter gave a haunting speech.

A number of concerts took place at the Platz der Republik in the late 1980s, including David Bowie in 1987 as part of the Glass Spider Tour, Eurythmics as part of the Revenge Tour, and Genesis as part of the Invisible Touch Tour. In 1988, Pink Floyd performed as part of the A Momentary Lapse of Reason Tour and Michael Jackson as part of the Bad World Tour.

On 22 July 2005, an ultralight aircraft crashed on the square, killing the pilot. The police later determined that it was a likely suicide.

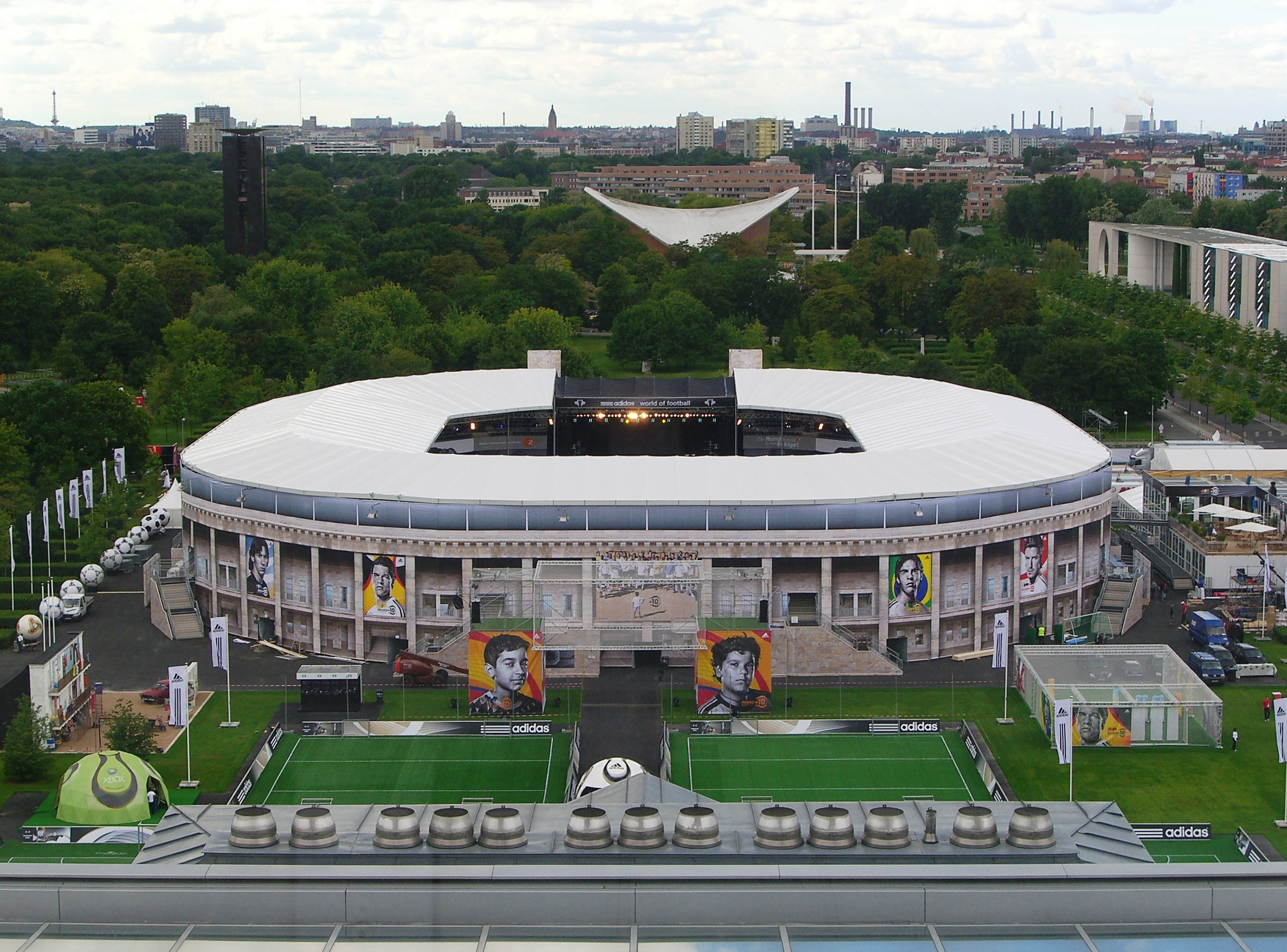
Adidas World of Football on the Platz der Republik, 2006

Leading up to the 2006 FIFA World Cup, in April 2006 the sports company Adidas began to asphalt the square in order to erect the "Adidas World of Football", a miniature version of the Olympiastadion Berlin with about 8,000 seats. It was used to show live coverage of the football games. After the event, Adidas restored the square to its prior condition; this included finding trees all over Germany that matched the trees that had to be removed.

== Sources ==
- Hans-Werner Klünner: Berliner Plätze. Fotografien von Max Missmann. Nicolaische Verlagsbuchhandlung Beuermann GmbH, Berlin 1996, ISBN 3-87584-610-9, S. 76–79.
- Heinz Ohff, Rainer Höynck (Hrsg.): Das BerlinBuch. Stapp-Verlag, Berlin 1987, ISBN 3-877762-31-X.
- Wolfgang Ribbe, Jürgen Schmädicke: Kleine Berlin-Geschichte. 3. erweiterte und aktualisierte Auflage. Stapp-Verlag, Berlin 1994, ISBN 3-877762-22-0.
