= Reichstag building =

Seat of the federal parliament of Germany

Reichstag
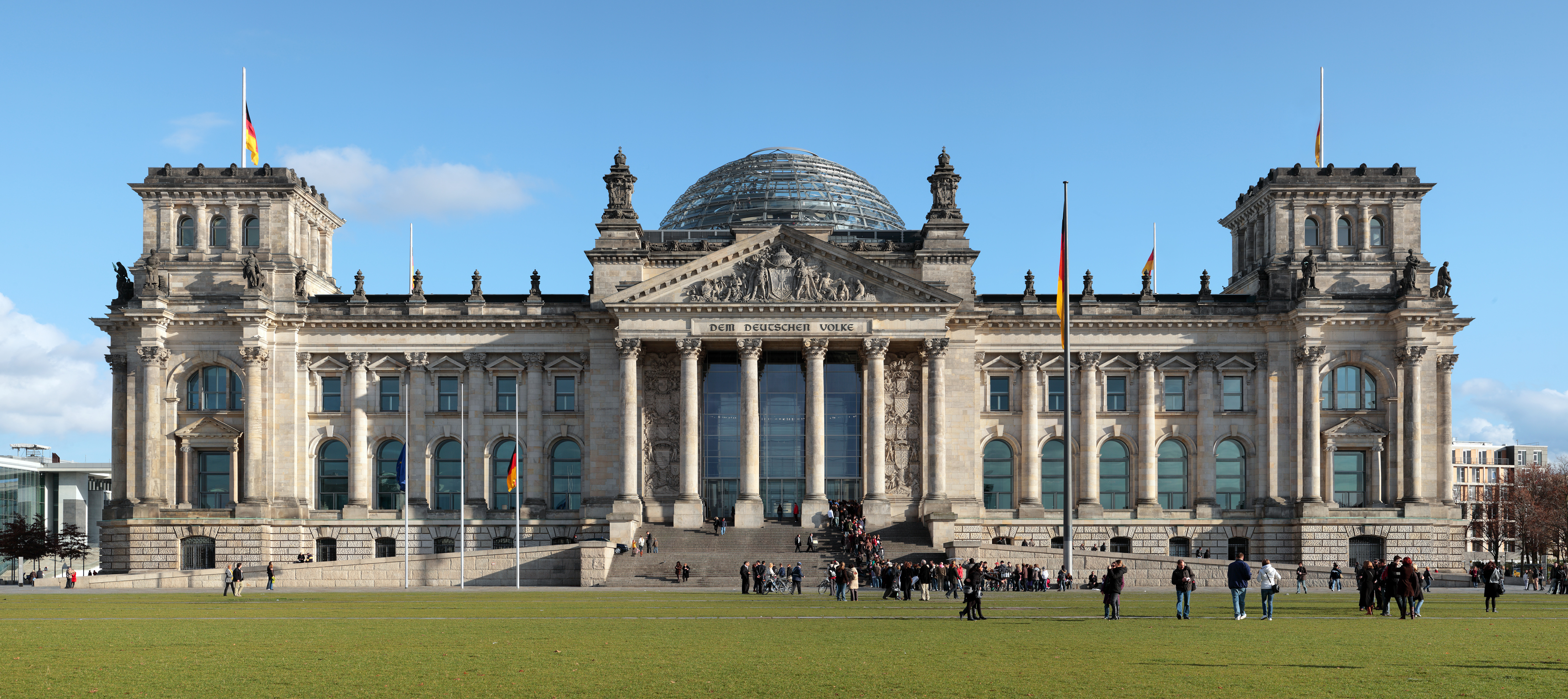
- The dedication Dem deutschen Volke, meaning To the German people, can be seen on the frieze above the entrance.

General information
- Location: Platz der Republik 1, 11011 Berlin, Berlin, Germany
- Coordinates: 52°31′07″N 13°22′34″E
- Current tenants: Bundestag
- Construction started: 9 June 1884
- Completed: 1894; 132 years ago
- Renovated: 1934–1937, 1961–1964, 1992–1999

Height
- Height: 47 m (154 ft)

Technical details
- Floor count: 6
- Floor area: 61,166 m^{2} (658,390 sq ft)

Design and construction
- Architect: Paul Wallot

Renovating team
- Architect: Norman Foster

The Reichstag (/ˈraɪʃstæɡ, ˈraɪxstɑːɡ/; German: [ˈraɪçsˌtaːk]) (Note: Officially: Plenarbereich Reichstagsgebäude [ˈʁaɪçstaːksɡəˌbɔʏdə], lit. 'Plenary Area Reich Assembly Building') is a historic legislative government building on Platz der Republik in Berlin that is the seat of the Bundestag parliament. It is also the meeting place of the Federal Convention, which elects the president of Germany.

The Neo-Renaissance building was constructed between 1884 and 1894 in the Tiergarten district on the left bank of the River Spree based on plans by the architect Paul Wallot. It housed the Reichstag (legislature) of the German Empire and subsequent Weimar Republic. The Reich's Federal Council also originally met there. The building was initially used by the Reichstag for Nazi Germany, but severe damage in the Reichstag fire of 1933 prevented further use and the Reichstag moved to the nearby Kroll Opera House. The 1933 fire became a pivotal event in the entrenchment of the Nazi regime. The building took further damage during World War II, and its symbolism made it an important target for the Red Army during the Battle of Berlin.

After the war, the building was modernised and partially restored in the 1950s and used for exhibitions and special events, as its location in West Berlin prevented its use as a parliament building by either of the two Germanies. From 1995 to 1999, the Reichstag was fundamentally redesigned by Norman Foster for its permanent use as a parliament building in the now reunified Germany. The keys were ceremonially handed over to the president of the Bundestag, Wolfgang Thierse, on 19 April 1999. A landmark of the city is the redesigned walk-in glass dome above the plenary chamber, proposed by artist and architect Gottfried Böhm.

== Etymology ==
The term Reichstag, when used to connote a diet, dates back to the Holy Roman Empire. The building was built for the Diet of the German Empire, which was succeeded by the Reichstag of the Weimar Republic. The latter would become the Reichstag of Nazi Germany, which left the building (and ceased to act as a parliament) after the 1933 fire and never returned, using the Kroll Opera House instead; the term Reichstag has not been used by German parliaments since World War II. In today's usage, the word Reichstag (Imperial Diet) refers mainly to the building, while Bundestag (Federal Diet) refers to the institution.

== History ==
=== Imperial and Weimar Republic eras ===
Construction of the building began well after the unification of Germany in 1871. Starting in 1871, and for the next 23 years, the parliament met in the former property of the Königliche Porzellan-Manufaktur Berlin, at Leipziger Straße 4. In 1872, an architectural contest with 103 participating architects was carried out to erect a new building, a contest won by Ludwig Bohnstedt. The plan incorporated the Königsplatz (today's Platz der Republik), which was then occupied by the palace of a Polish-Prussian aristocrat, Athanasius Raczyński. That property was unavailable at the time.

In 1882, another architectural contest was held, with 200 architects participating. This time, the winner—the Frankfurt architect Paul Wallot—would actually see his Neo-Baroque project executed. The direct model for Wallot's design was Philadelphia's Memorial Hall, the main building of the 1876 Centennial Exhibition. Wallot adorned the building's façade with crowns and eagles symbolising imperial strength. The building's four corner towers represented the four German kingdoms at unification, Prussia, Bavaria, Saxony and Württemberg, and the heraldic coat of arms of each kingdom, as well as smaller devices representing various German city-states, flanked the main entrance, celebrating the process of unification. Some of the Reichstag's decorative sculptures, reliefs, and inscriptions were by sculptor Otto Lessing.

On 9 June 1884, the foundation stone was finally laid by Wilhelm I, at the east side of the Königsplatz. Before construction was completed by Philipp Holzmann A.G. in 1894, Wilhelm I died (in 1888, the Year of Three Emperors). His eventual successor, Wilhelm II, took a more jaundiced view of parliamentary democracy than his grandfather. The original building was acclaimed for the construction of an original cupola of steel and glass, considered an engineering feat at the time. But its mixture of architectural styles drew widespread criticism.

In front of the Reichstag building, the Bismarck Memorial was erected in 1897-1901. It was moved together with the Victory Column in 1938-1939.

In 1916, the iconic words Dem deutschen Volke ("To the German People") were placed above the main façade of the building, much to the displeasure of Wilhelm II, who had tried to block the adding of the inscription for its democratic significance. During the revolutionary days of 1918, two days before World War I ended and just hours after Wilhelm's abdication was announced, Philipp Scheidemann proclaimed the institution of a republic from one of the balconies of the Reichstag building on 9 November. The building continued to be the seat of the parliament of the Weimar Republic (1919–1933), which was still called the Reichstag. Up to 42 protesters died during the Reichstag Bloodbath of 13 January 1920, when workers tried to protest against a law that would restrict their rights; it was the bloodiest demonstration in German history.

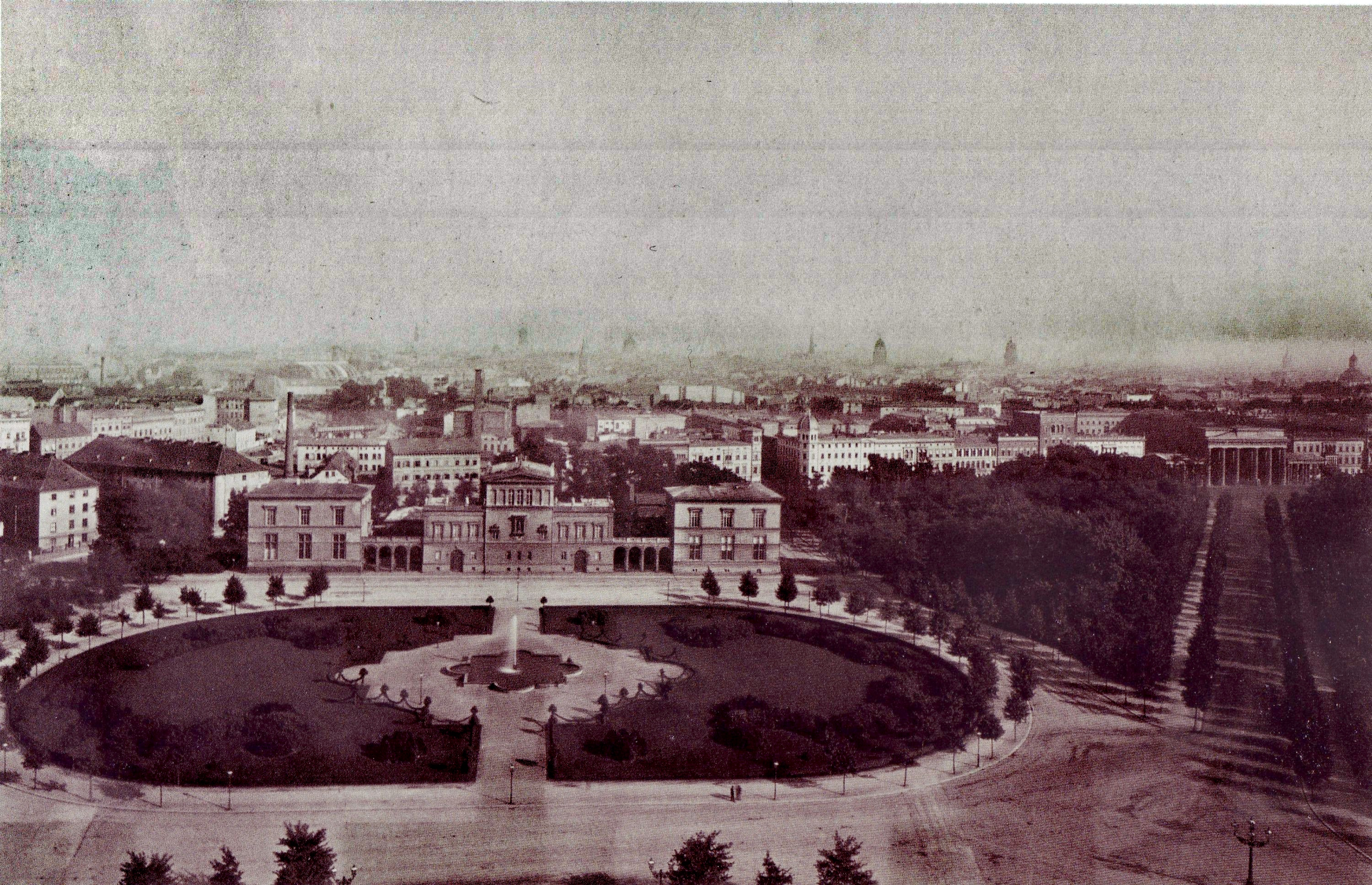
The Königsplatz in 1880 with the Raczyński Palace (an art gallery demolished in 1883 to make way for the Reichstag)

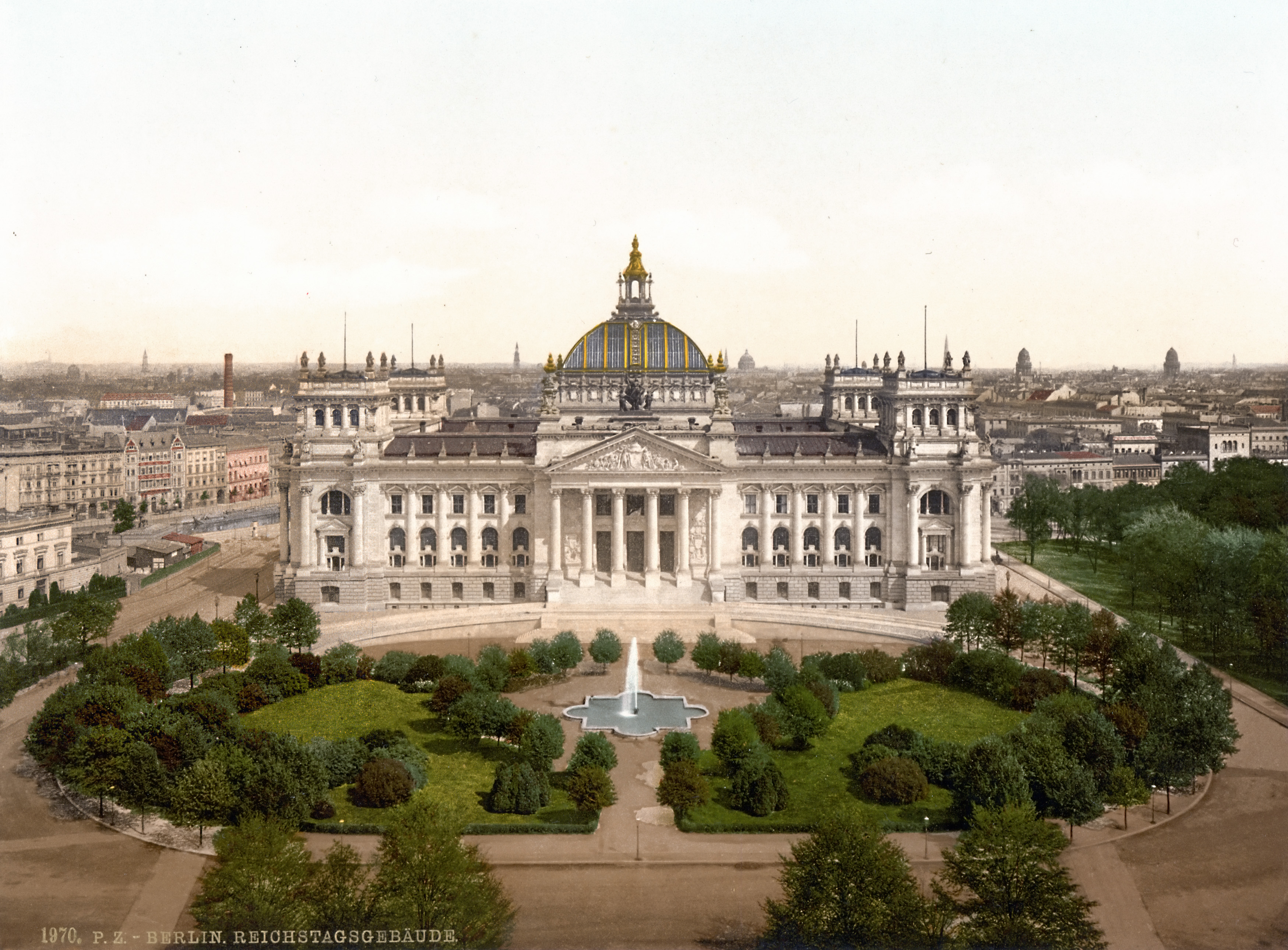
The Reichstag building on the Königsplatz seen from the Siegessäule, c. 1900

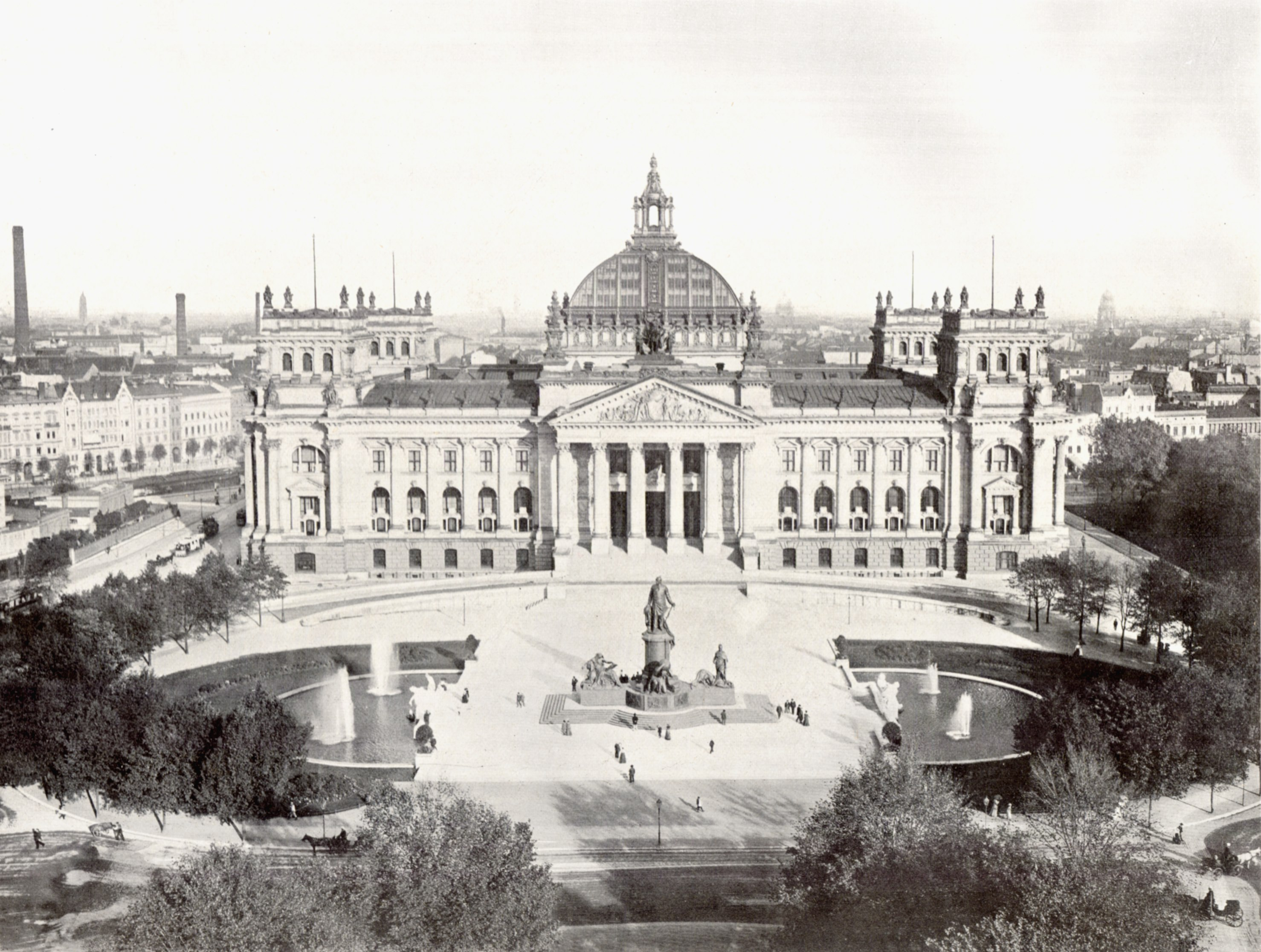
The Reichstag building with the newly built Bismarck Memorial, c. 1900

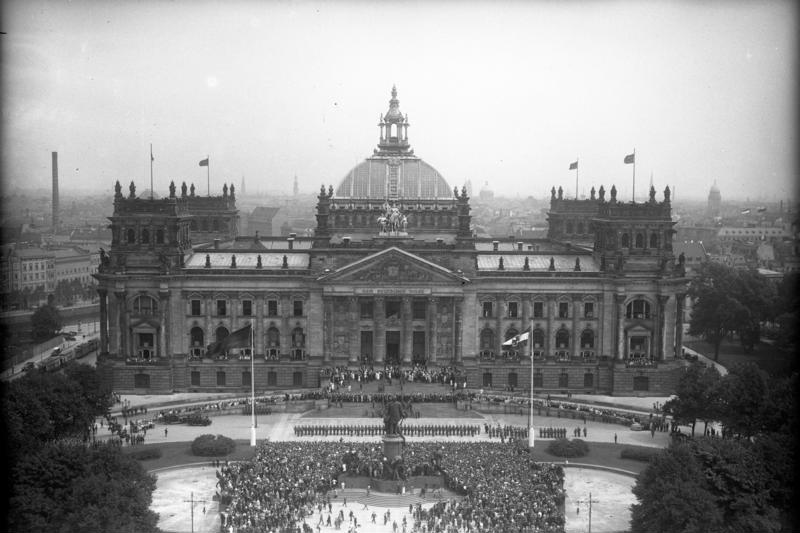
The Reichstag building, constitution celebration, 11 August 1932

=== Nazi era ===
On 27 February 1933, the Reichstag building was severely damaged in an arson attack, precisely four weeks after Nazi leader Adolf Hitler was sworn in as Chancellor of Germany. Despite the firefighters' efforts, most of the building was gutted. Marinus van der Lubbe, a Dutch "council communist", was the apparent culprit; however, Hitler attributed the fire to Communist agitators. He used it as a pretext to claim that Communists were plotting against the German government, and induced President Paul von Hindenburg to issue the Reichstag Fire Decree suspending civil liberties, and pursue a "ruthless confrontation" with the Communists.

Following the Reichstag fire, the nearby Kroll Opera House was modified into a legislative chamber and served as the location of all parliamentary sessions for the next 12 years of Nazi rule, while the Reichstag building became the setting for political exhibitions. In 1939, the library and archive were moved elsewhere, and the windows bricked up as the building was made into a fortress. By 1943, the building was used as a hospital, and a radio tube manufacturing facility by AEG.

While the Soviets placed great importance in its capture during the 1945 Battle of Berlin, the Reichstag had not been used by the Nazi government since it had burned in 1933 and was left largely in ruins ever since. The Germans did not regard the location as especially vital, but nonetheless deployed a substantial garrison force to defend it.

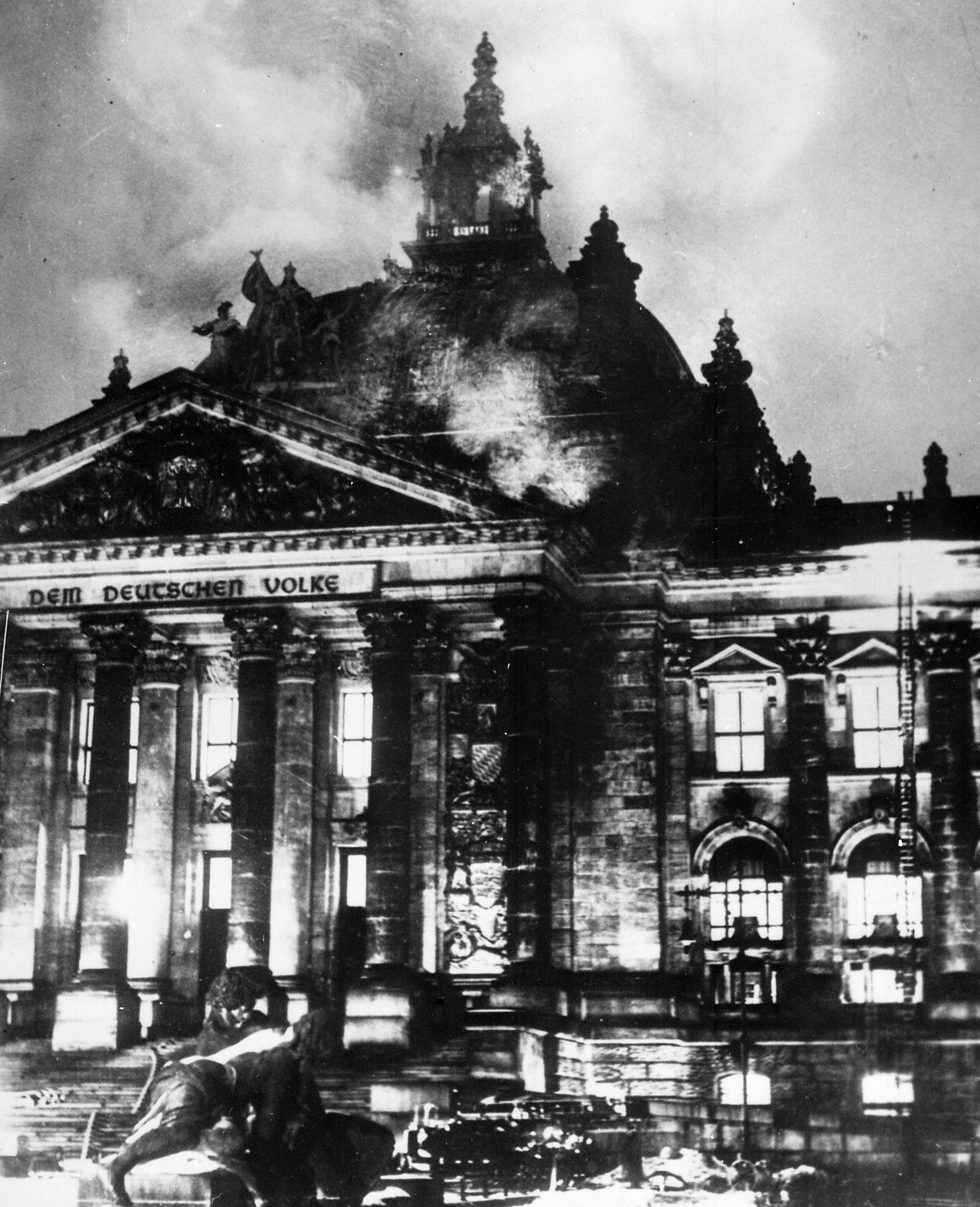
The Reichstag building on fire, 27 February 1933

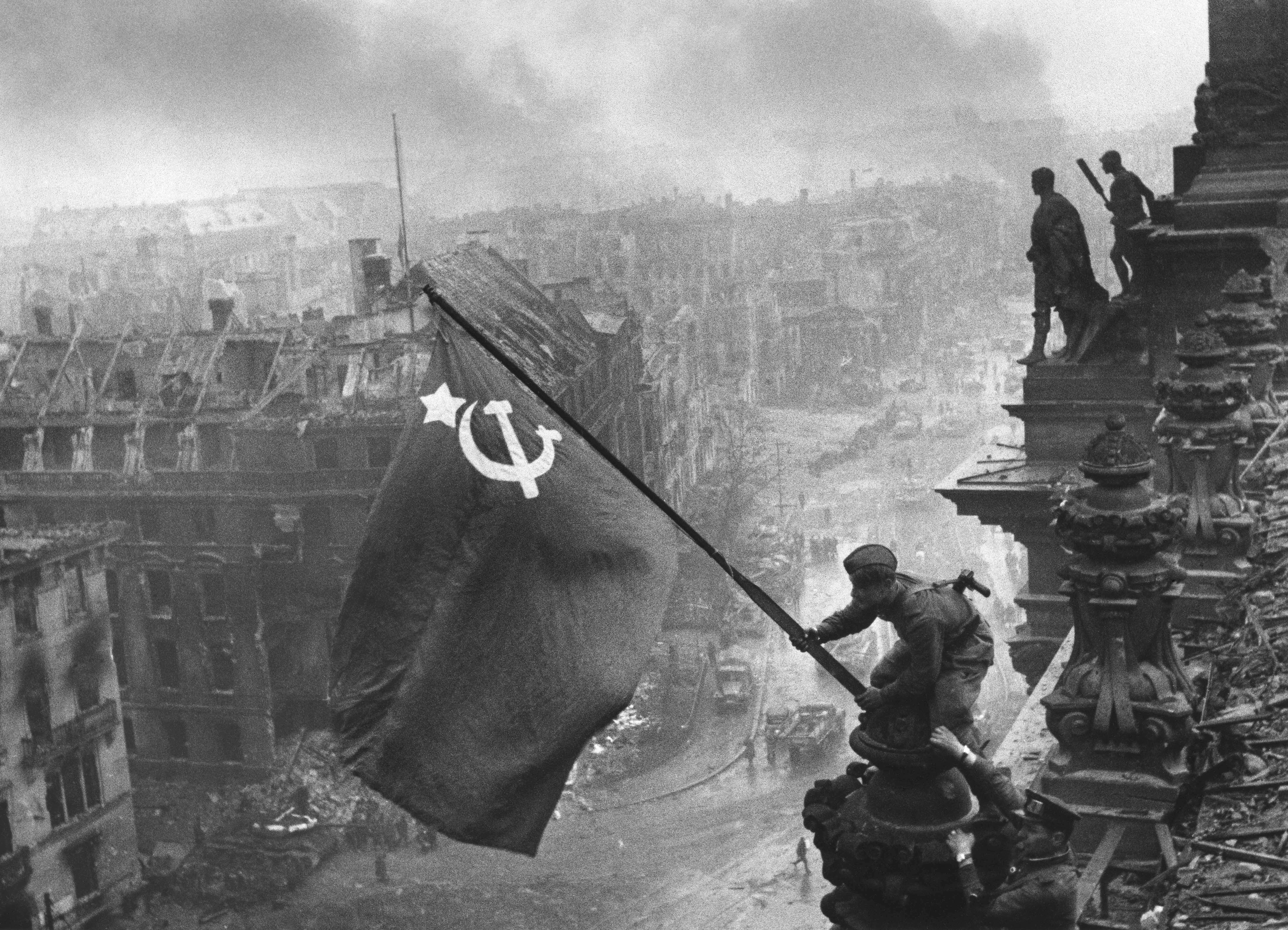
Raising a Flag over the Reichstag, by Yevgeny Khaldei, 2 May 1945

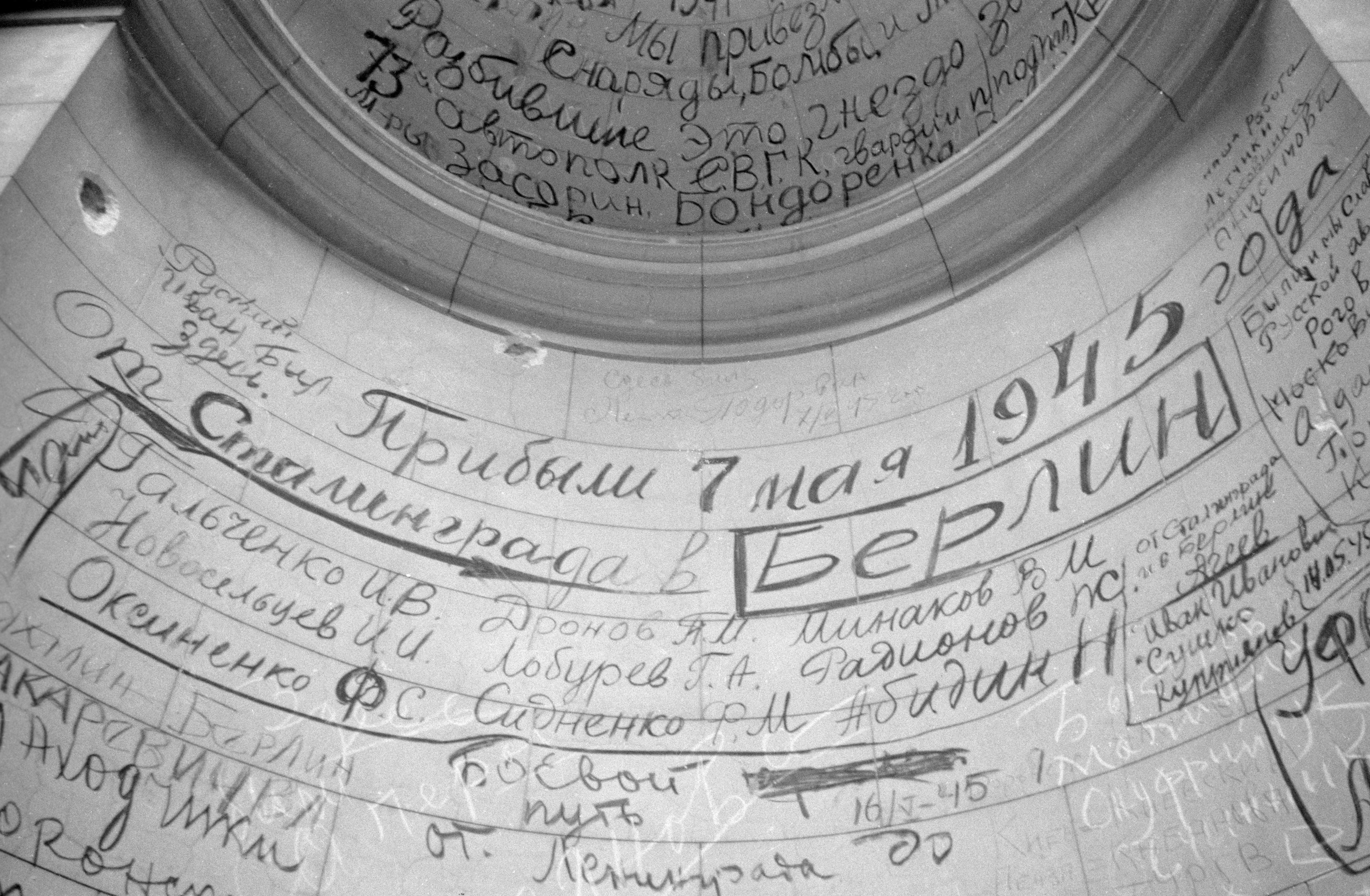
Graffiti left by Soviet soldiers on the walls of the Reichstag, May 1945

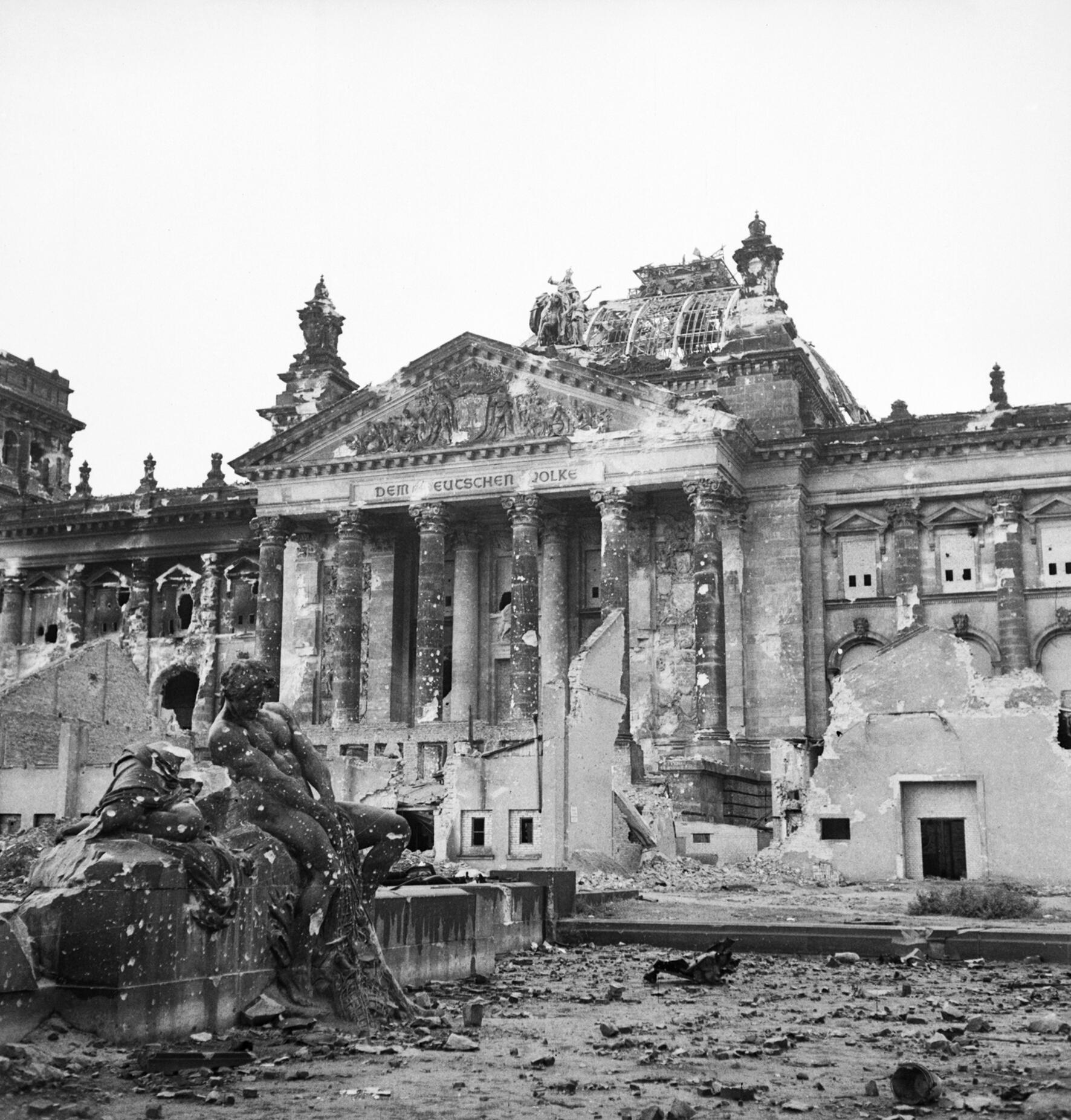
Ruins of the Reichstag building in postwar occupied Berlin, 3 June 1945

=== Cold War era ===
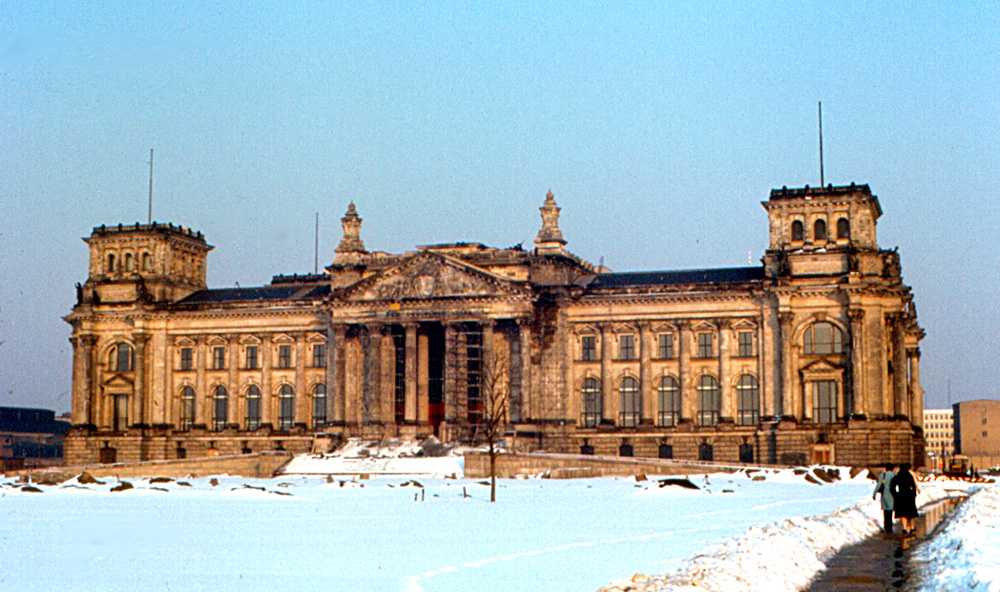
The Reichstag building in 1970, before reconstruction. The dome was still missing.

When the Cold War emerged, the building was physically within West Berlin, but in ruins. During the Berlin Blockade, an enormous number of West Berliners assembled before the building on 9 September 1948, and Mayor Ernst Reuter held a famous speech that ended with "Ihr Völker der Welt... schaut auf diese Stadt..." ("You people of the world...look upon this city...").

In 1956, after some debate, the West German government decided that the Reichstag should not be torn down, but be restored instead under the guidance of Paul Baumgarten. The cupola of the original building, which had also been heavily damaged in the war, was dismantled, and the outside façade made simpler with the removal of ornaments and statues. Reconstruction started in 1961, and was complete by 1971.

The artistic and practical value of his work was the subject of much debate after German reunification. Under the 1971 Four Power Agreement on Berlin, Berlin was formally outside the bounds of either East or West Germany, and so the West German parliament, the Bundestag, was not allowed to assemble formally in West Berlin. This prohibition was obeyed even though East Germany had declared East Berlin its capital, violating this provision. Until 1990, the building was thus used only for occasional representative meetings, and one-off events, such as a free concert given by British rock band Barclay James Harvest on 30 August 1980 and by Tangerine Dream on 29 August 1981. It was also used for a widely lauded permanent exhibition about German history called Fragen an die deutsche Geschichte ("Questions on German history").

On May 26, 1989, the Bethke brothers landed the ultralight airplanes they had used to defect from East Germany in front of the Reichstag.

=== Reunification ===
The official German reunification ceremony on 3 October 1990 was held at the Reichstag building, including Chancellor Helmut Kohl, President Richard von Weizsäcker, former Chancellor Willy Brandt and many others. The event included huge firework displays. The following day the parliament of the united Germany assembled as a symbolic act in the Reichstag building.

However, at that time, the role of Berlin had not yet been decided upon. Only after a fierce debate, considered by many as one of the most memorable sessions of parliament, on 20 June 1991, did the Bundestag conclude with quite a slim majority in favour of both government and parliament returning to Berlin from Bonn. On 21 June 1994, Norman Foster was asked to include a dome solution in his draft reconstruction proposal, which he included in his 10 February 1995 plans.

Before reconstruction began, the Reichstag was wrapped by the Bulgarian-American artists Christo and his wife Jeanne-Claude in 1995, attracting millions of visitors. The project was financed by the artists through the sale of preparatory drawings and collages, as well as early works of the 1950s and 1960s.

During the reconstruction, the building was first almost completely gutted, taking out everything except the outer walls, including all changes made by Baumgarten in the 1960s. Respect for the historic aspects of the building was one of the conditions stipulated to the architects, so traces of historical events were to be retained in a visible state. Among them were bullet holes and graffiti left by Soviet soldiers after the final battle for Berlin in April–May 1945. However, graffiti considered offensive was removed, in agreement with Russian diplomats at the time.

Reconstruction was completed in 1999, with the Bundestag convening there officially for the first time on 19 April of that year. The Reichstag is now the second most visited attraction in Germany, not least because of the huge glass dome that was erected on the roof as a gesture to the original 1894 cupola, giving an impressive view over the city, especially at night.

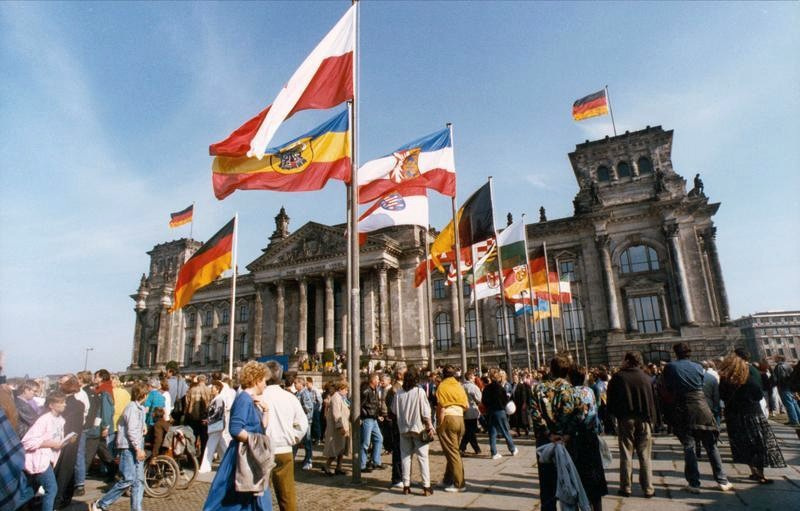
The Reichstag building during the official German reunification ceremony, with flags of all German states, 3 October 1990

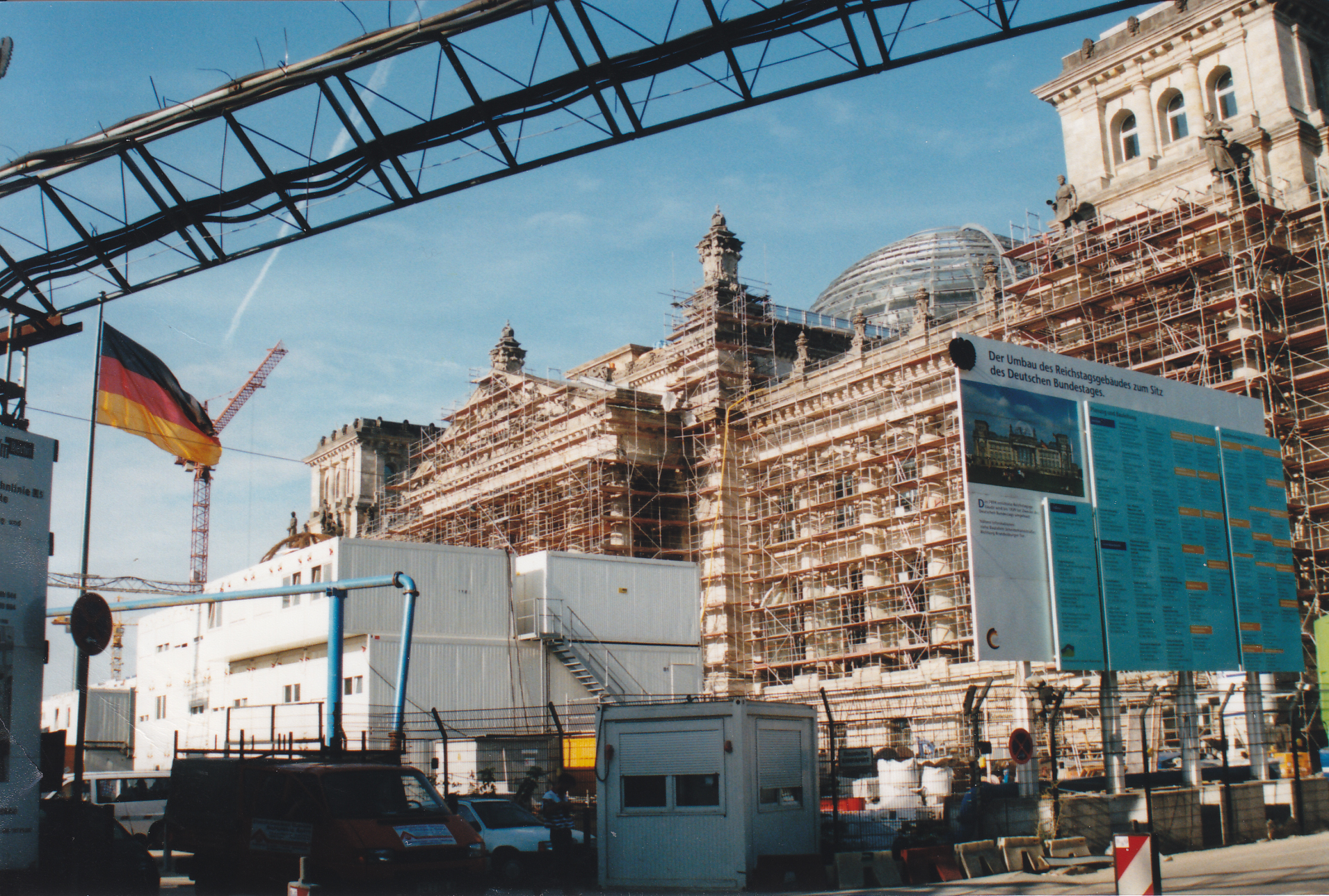
The Reichstag covered in scaffolding during its reconstruction, August 1998. The new dome can be seen above the roofline.

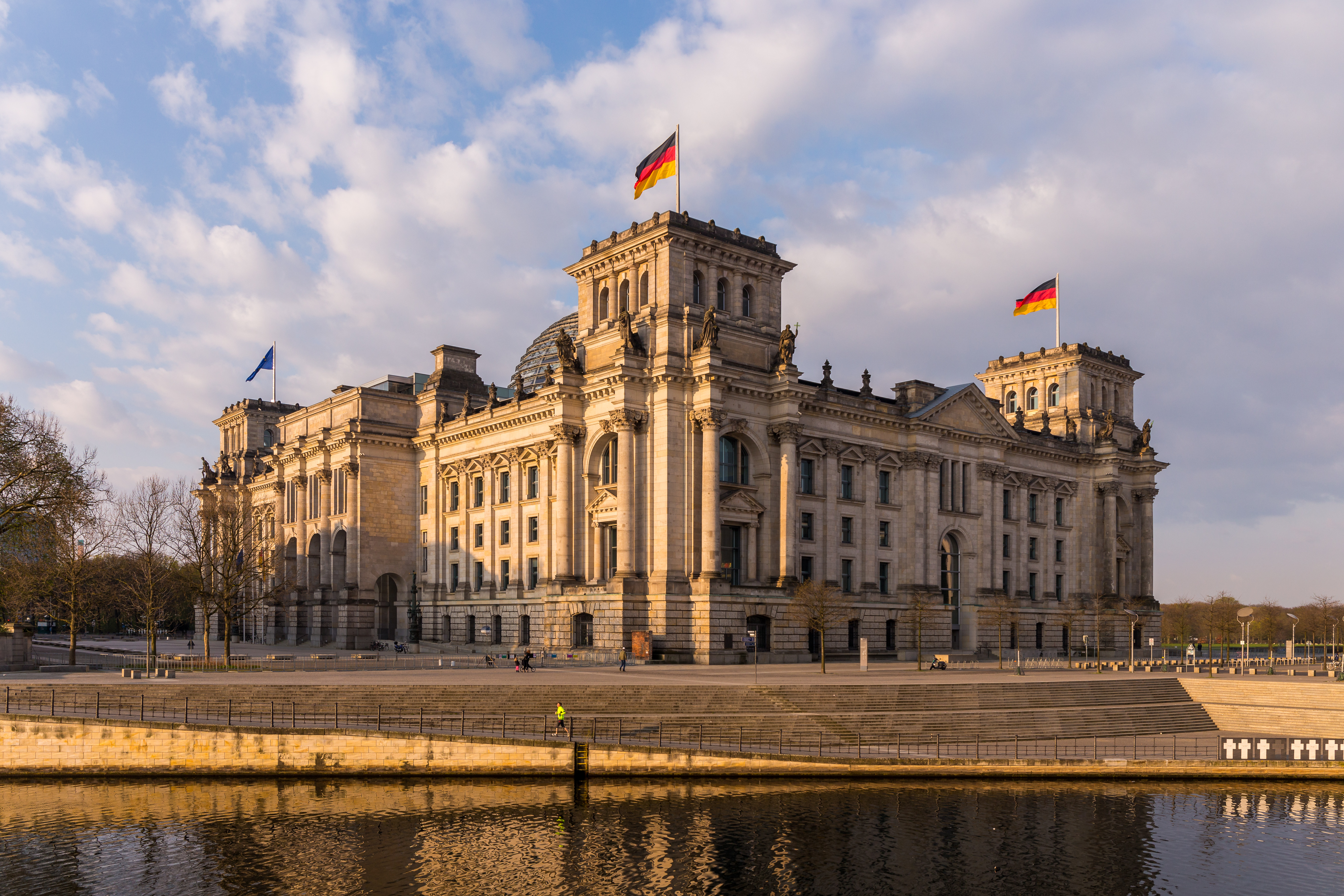
The Reichstag as seen from the north-east in 2017, after reconstruction

== Dome ==
The large glass dome at the very top of the Reichstag has a 360° view of the surrounding Berlin cityscape. The main hall (debating chamber) of the parliament below can also be seen from inside the dome, and natural light from above radiates down to the parliament floor. A large sun shield tracks the movement of the sun electronically and blocks direct sunlight which would not only cause large solar gain, but dazzle those below. Construction work was finished in 1999 and the seat of parliament was transferred to the Bundestag in April of that year. The dome is open to visitors by prior registration.

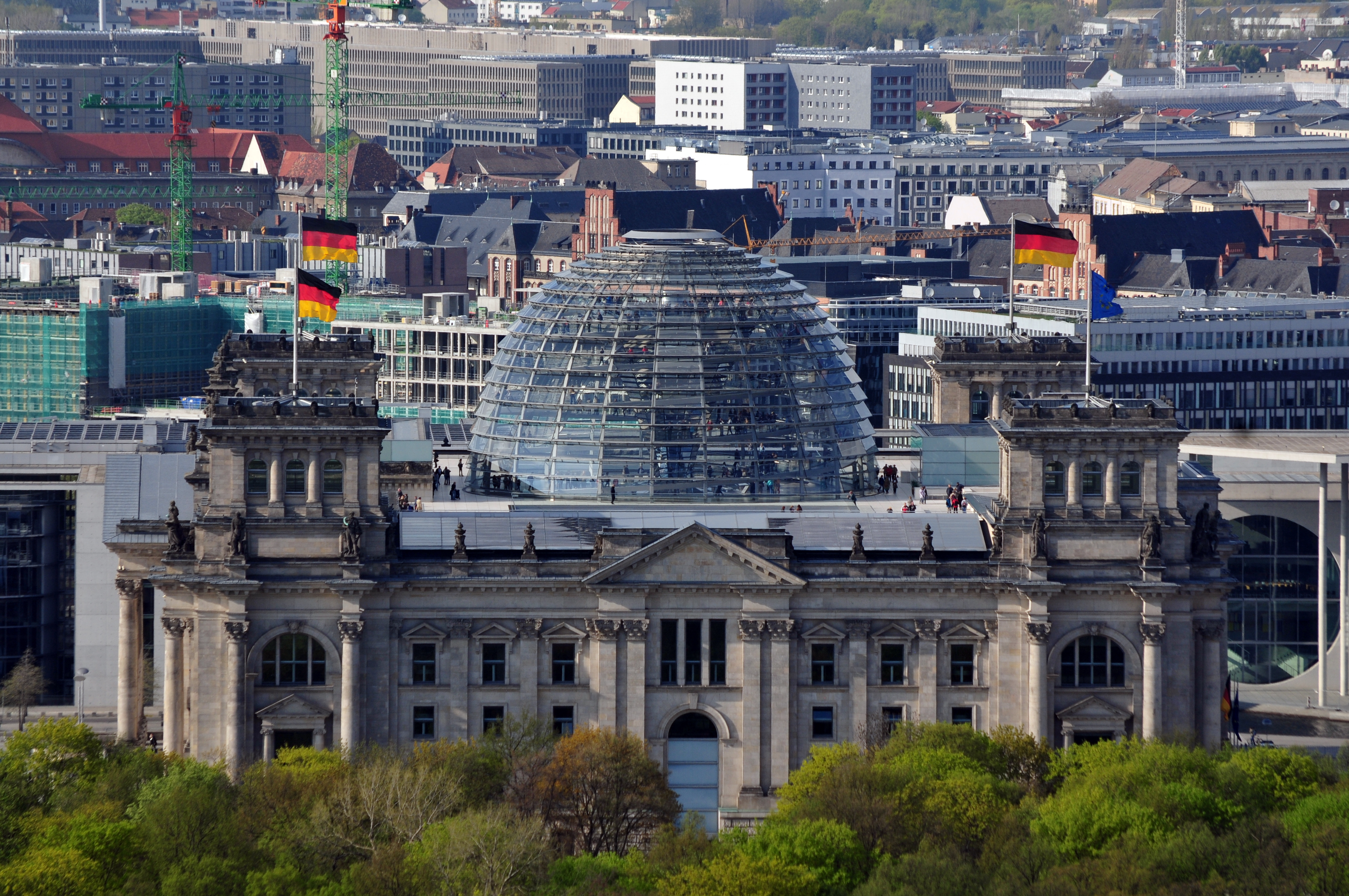
The Reichstag building with Gottfried Böhm's and Norman Foster's glass dome seen from Potsdamer Platz

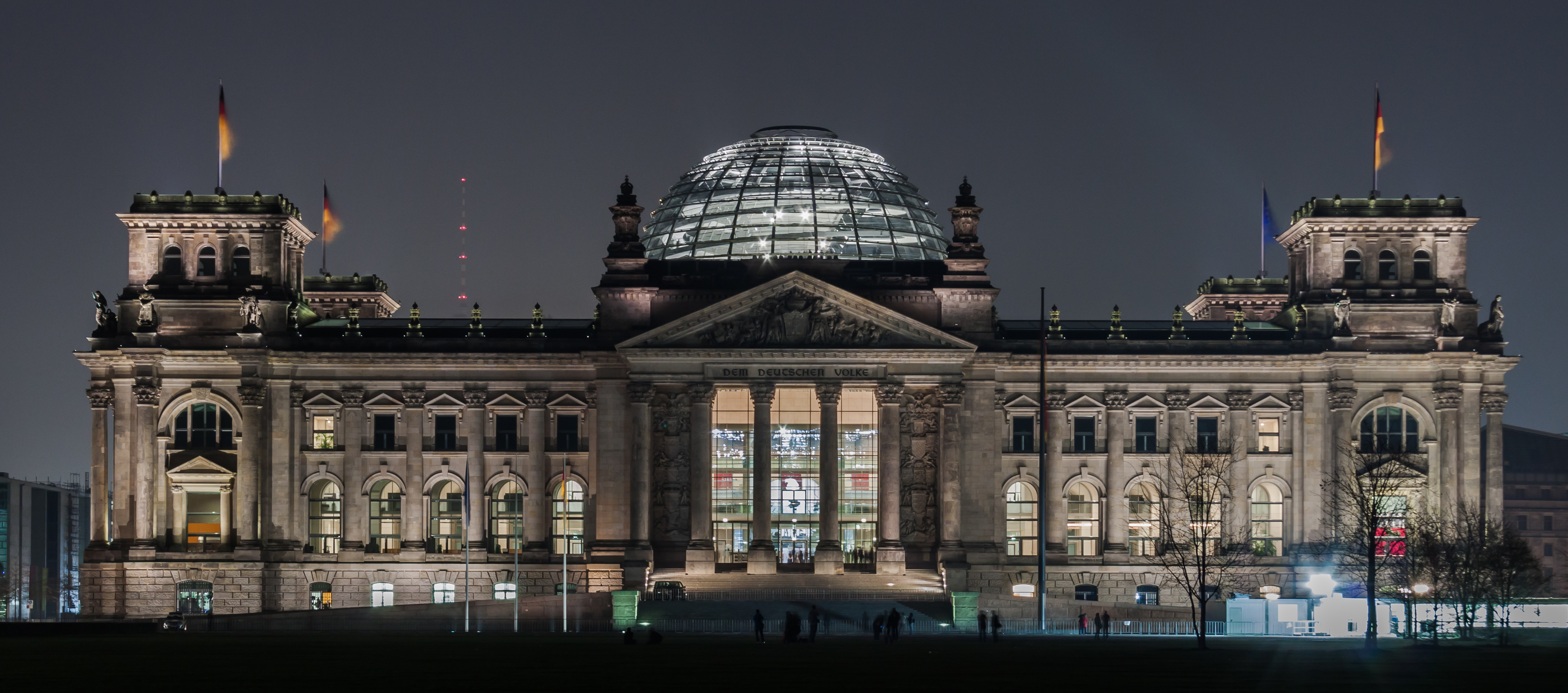
The Reichstag's west facade and illuminated dome at night from Platz der Republik

== 2026 flag incident ==
On 8 November, 2026 a pro-Palestinian activist climbed a flagpole in Platz der Republik, right in front of the Reichstag building and removed the German national flag, replacing it with a Palestinian flag. The 22 year old activist, was assisted by two other individuals while a group called "Peacefully Against Genocide", took responsibility for the incident, under the claim of solidarity with Palestine. Police and firefighters subsequently removed the flag, opened an investigation and held the activist in custody for a while, later releasing him, under a ban from the area. Following the incident, Bundestag President Julia Klöckner said "Our German Bundestag needs more protection!".

== See also ==
- List of legislative buildings
- List of tourist attractions in Berlin
- Band des Bundes
- Christo and Jeanne-Claude
- National Diet Building of Japan
- Reichskanzlei
- Reichstag (disambiguation)
- Reich Court building
