= Atanazy Raczyński =

Polish diplomat, art historian (1788–1874)

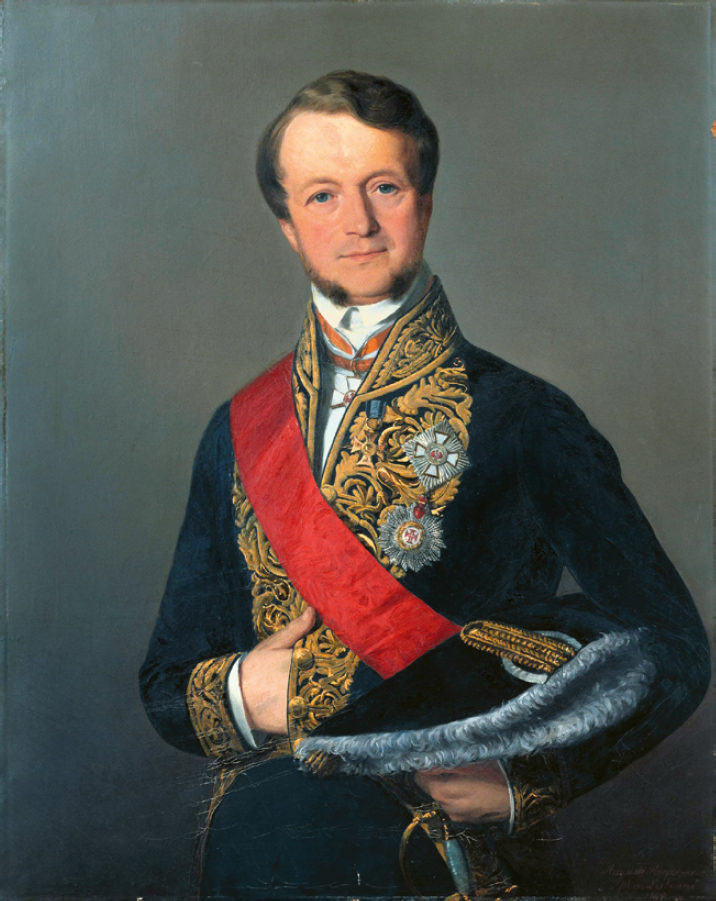
Portrait of Atanazy Raczyński by Auguste Roquemont, 1845

Count Atanazy Raczyński (German: Athanasius Raczynski; 2 May 1788 – 21 August 1874) was a Polish count (hrabia) and diplomat in Prussian service. He was a noted art critic and built a notable collection of paintings during his long stays in major European metropolises.

He wrote Histoire de l'Art Moderne en Allemagne (1837-1841), an important source for the study of the contemporary German painting.

During his stay in the Kingdom of Portugal (1842-1848), Raczyński conducted extensive research on local art and its history and published Les Arts en Portugal (Paris, 1846) and Dictionnaire Historico-Artistique du Portugal (Paris, 1847); his critical insight on issues often little recognised or described before him make his works be considered in Portugal to be the first serious modern works on Portuguese art history, having since become an invaluable point of reference for later generations of scholars.

His great residence, Palais Raczynski in Königsplatz, became after his death the site of the new Reichstag building.
