= Bismarck Memorial (Berlin) =

Sculpture in Berlin, Germany

Coordinates: 52.5158°N 13.3497°E

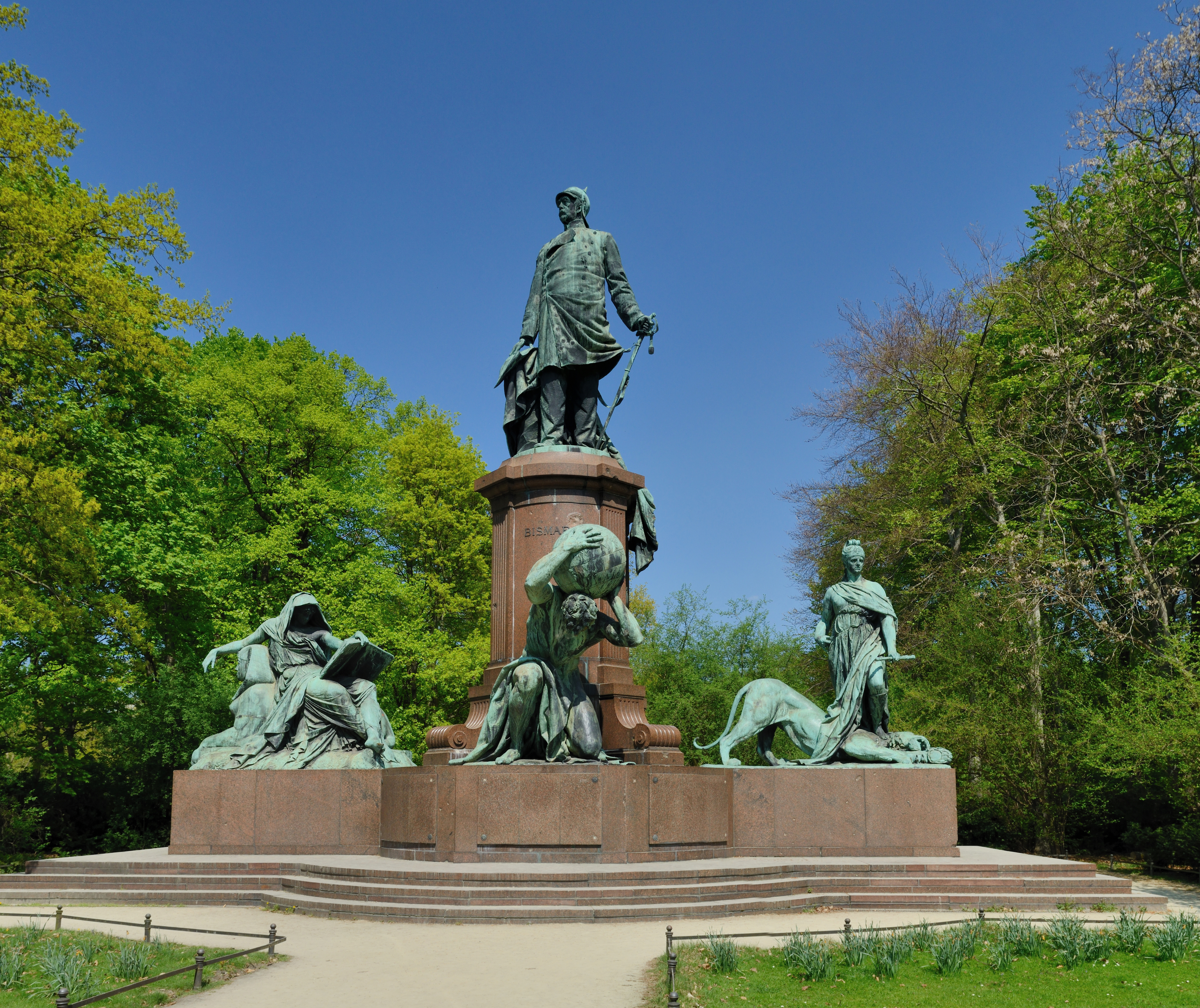
- Year: 1901
- Medium: Sculpture
- Location: Großer Tiergarten, Berlin, Germany

The Bismarck Memorial (German: Bismarck-Nationaldenkmal) is a prominent memorial statue in the Tiergarten in Berlin dedicated to Prince Otto von Bismarck, Minister President of the Kingdom of Prussia and the first Chancellor of the German Empire. It was sculpted by Reinhold Begas and unveiled in 1901.

It is one of 250 memorials to Bismarck worldwide.

This memorial in Berlin portrays Bismarck in his ceremonial garb as Chancellor standing above statues of:

- Atlas, showing Germany's world power status at the end of the 19th century;
- Siegfried, forging a sword to show Germany's strong industrial and military might;
- Germania pinning underfoot a panther, symbolizing the suppression of discord and rebellion;
- a sibyl reclining on a sphinx and reading the book of history.

The statue, along with the famous Berlin victory column, were once located on the Königsplatz in front of the Reichstag building before they were moved in 1938 by Adolf Hitler in his project to recast Berlin as Welthauptstadt Germania. The statue weathered a marked amount of shrapnel damage during World War II, but has survived largely intact to the present day. In fact, the move probably saved the monument from total destruction, as the old garden in front of the Reichstag was obliterated in the war.

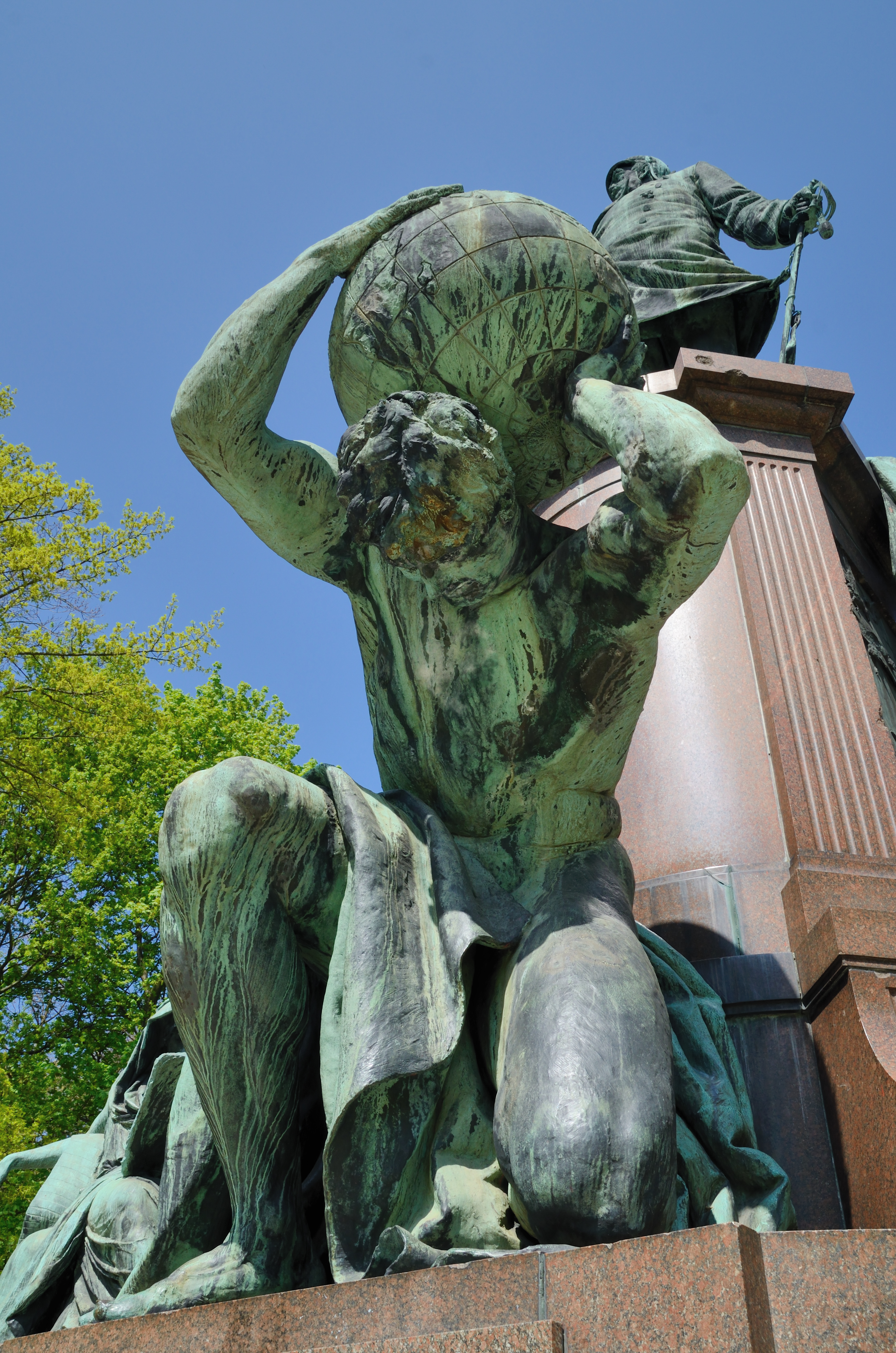
Kneeling Atlas

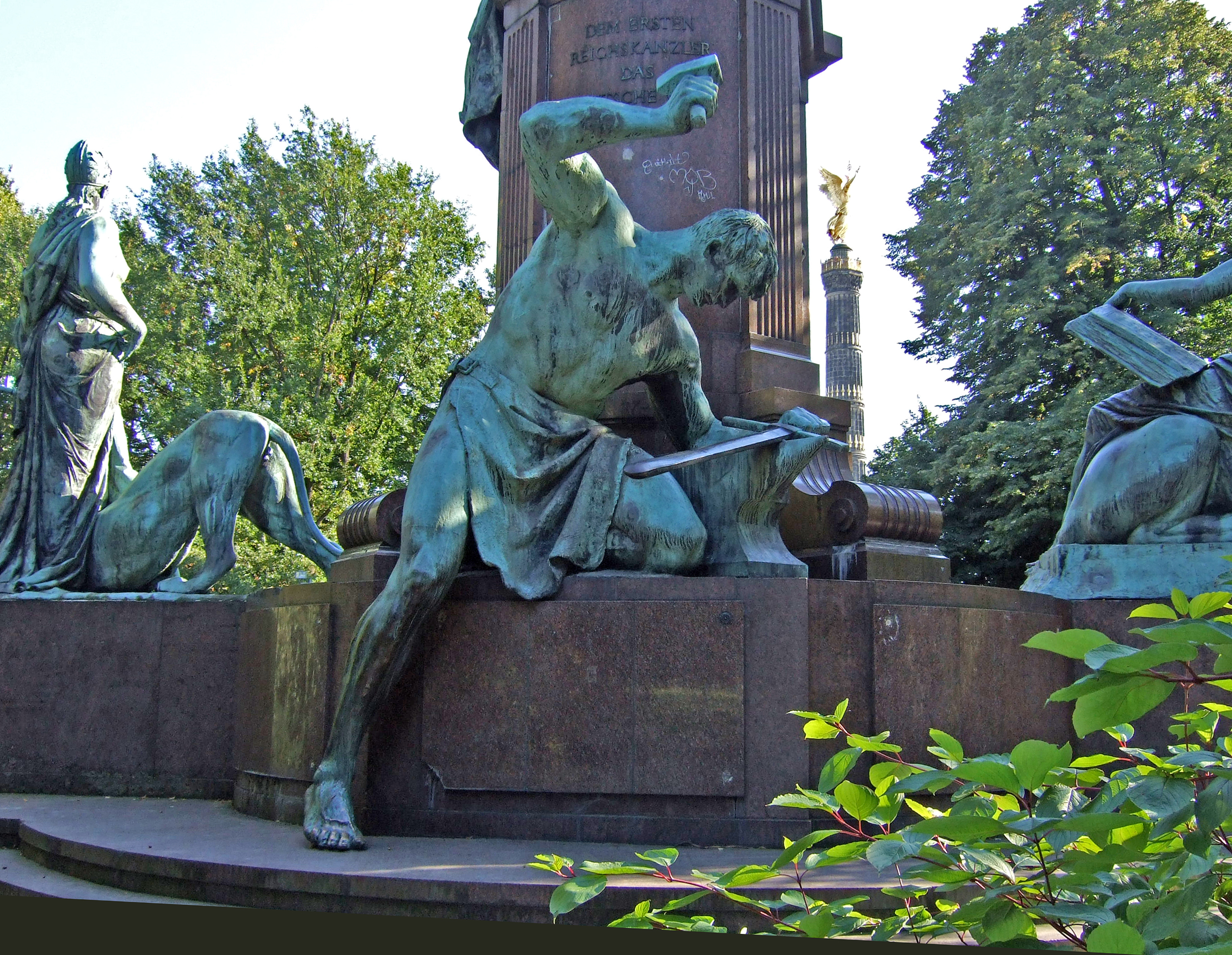
Siegfried forging the imperial sword

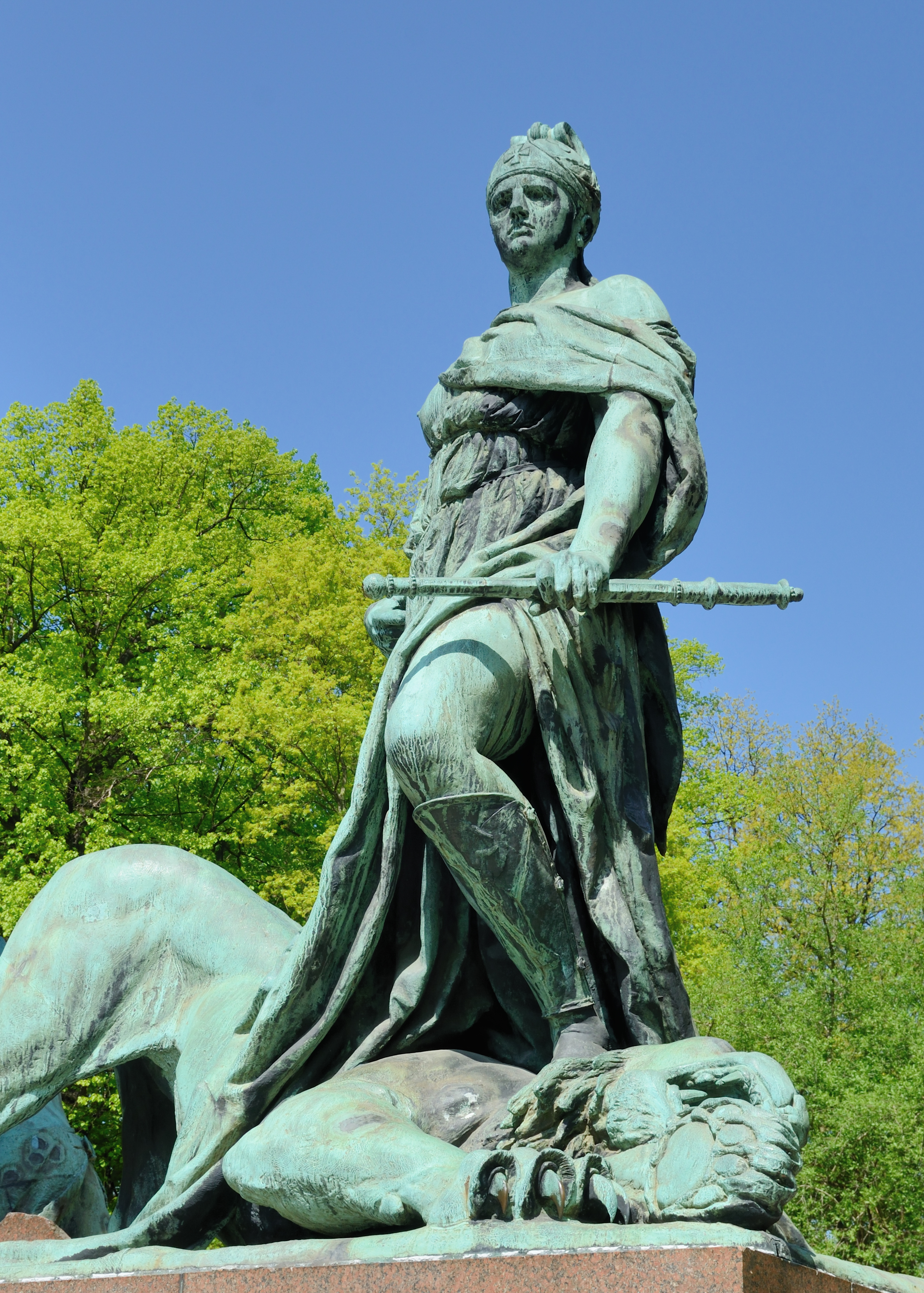
Germania suppressing discord and rebellion

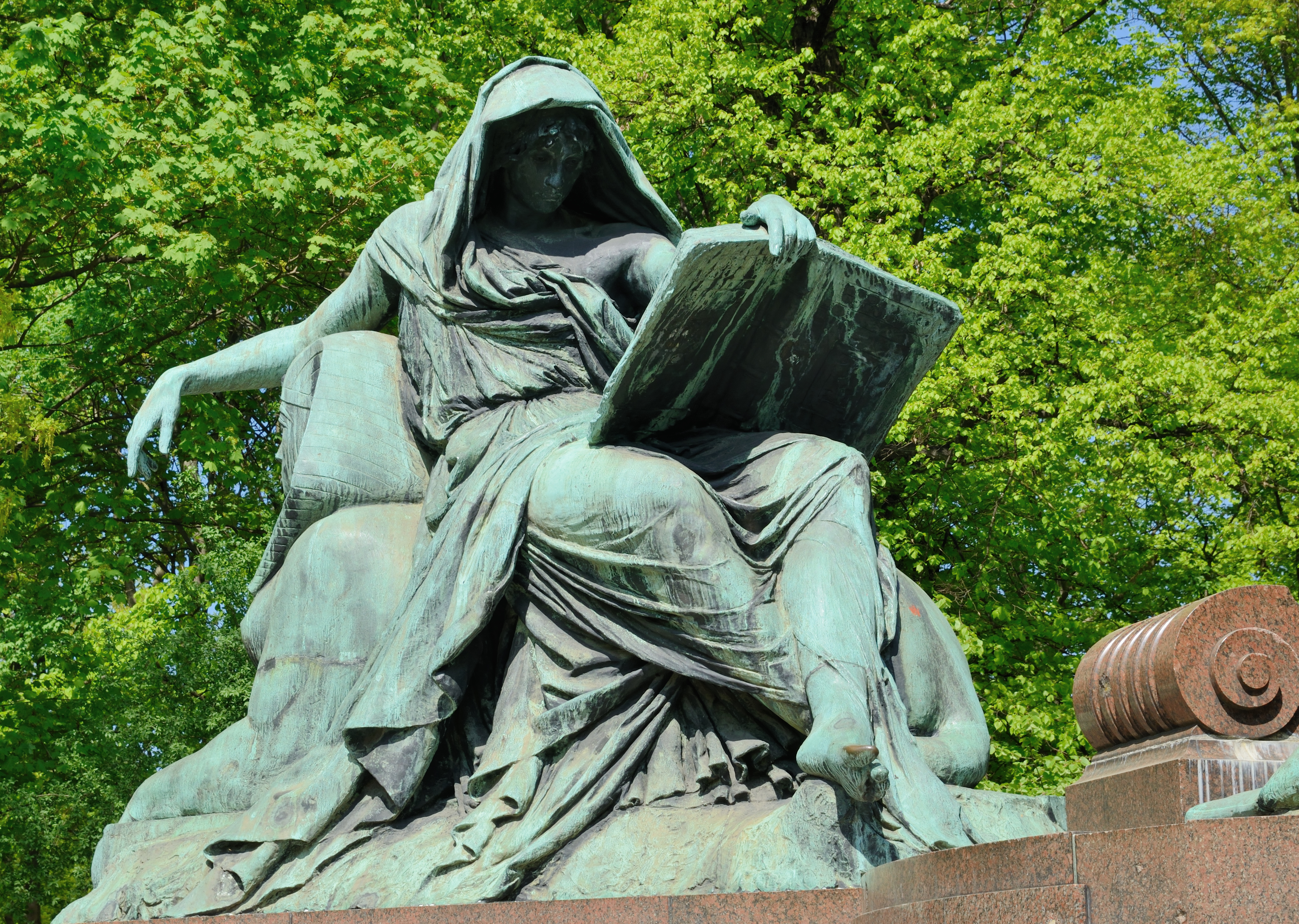
Sibyl reading the book of history

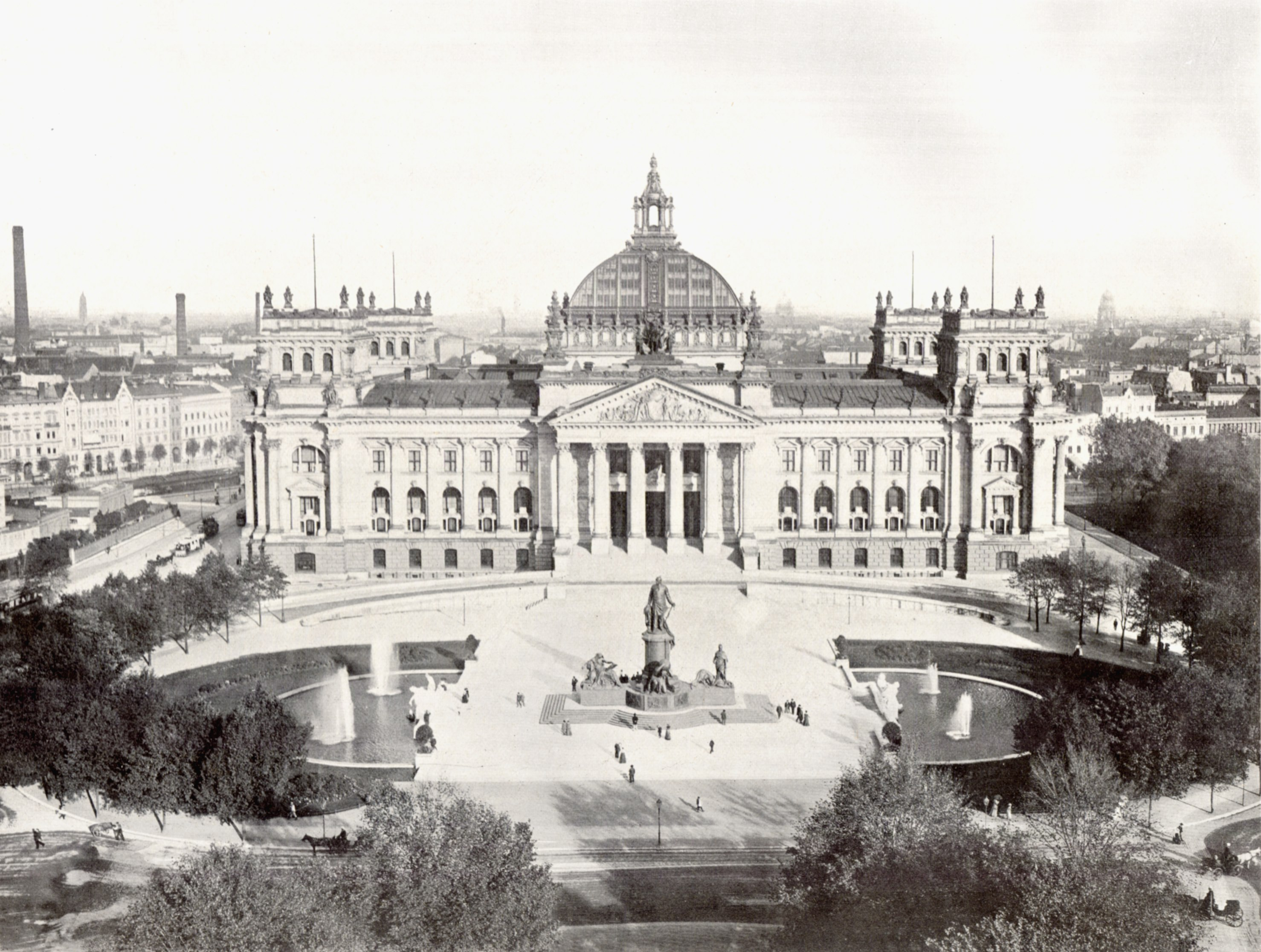
Former location on the Königsplatz in front of the Reichstag building, ca. 1900

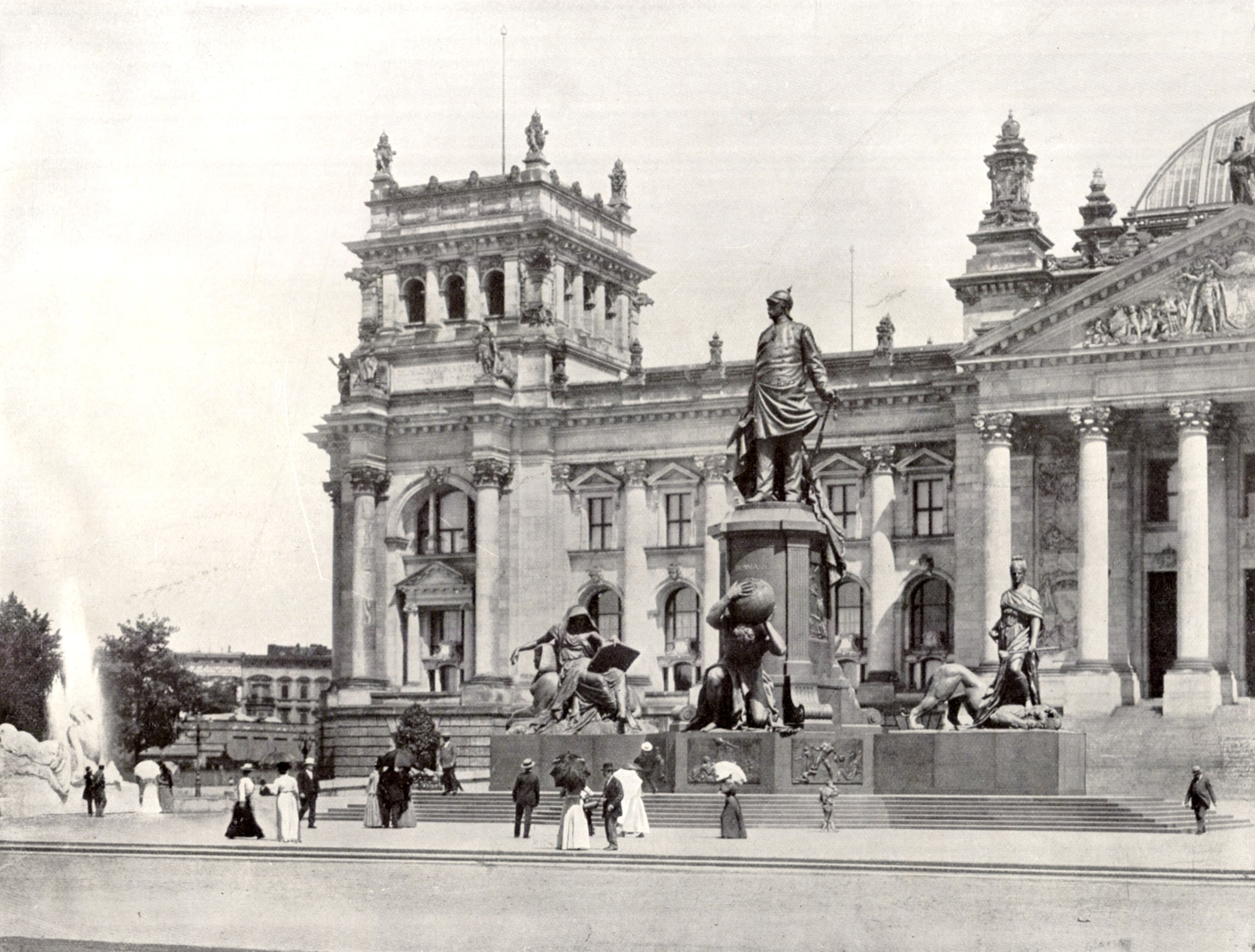
Bismarck Memorial, ca. 1900

== See also ==
- Bismarck monument
- Bismarck Monument (Hamburg)
- Bismarck tower
- List of public art in Berlin
