= Berlin Victory Column =

Monument in Germany

The Victory Column
- Siegessäule
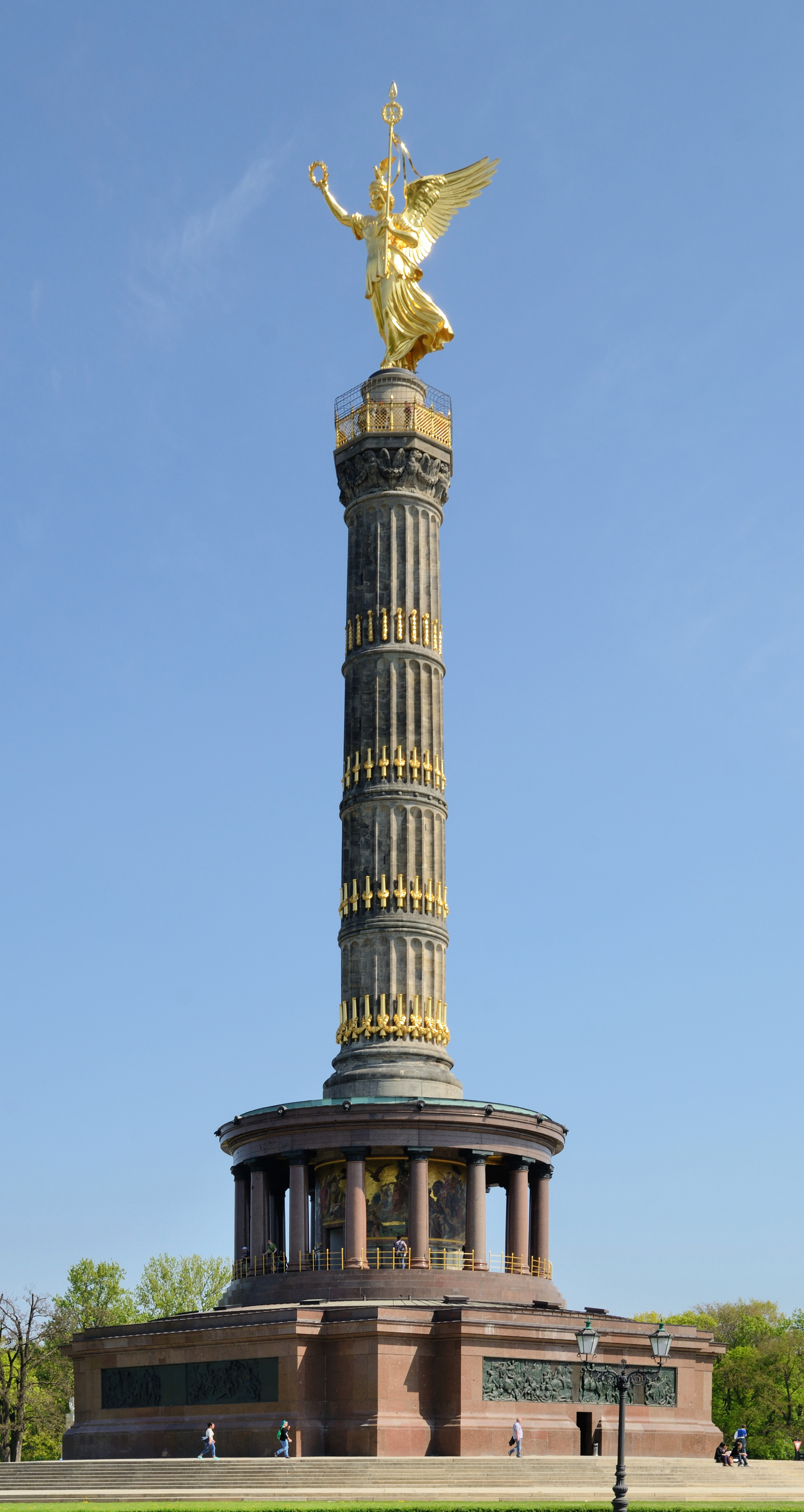
- Interactive map of The Victory Column
- Location: Berlin, Germany
- Coordinates: 52°30′52″N 13°21′0″E
- Height: 67 m
- Beginning date: 1864
- Completion date: 1873

The Victory Column (German: Siegessäule pronounced [ˈziːɡəsˌzɔɪ̯lə], from Sieg 'victory' + Säule 'column') is a monument in Berlin, Germany. Designed by Heinrich Strack after 1864 to commemorate the Prussian victory over Denmark in the Second Schleswig War, by the time it was inaugurated on 2 September 1873, Prussia had also defeated Austria and its German allies in the Austro-Prussian War (1866) and France in the Franco-Prussian War (1870–71), giving the statue a new purpose. Different from the original plans, these later victories in the unification wars inspired the addition of the bronze sculpture of Victoria, the Roman goddess of victory, 8.3 metres (27 ft) high, designed by Friedrich Drake, giving the victory column its current height of 67 m.

Berliners have given the statue the nickname Goldelse, meaning something like "Golden Lizzy", named after an 1866 novel by E. Marlitt and its heroine. The Victory Column is a major tourist attraction in the city of Berlin. Its viewing platform, for which a ticket is required, offers a view over Berlin.

== Design ==
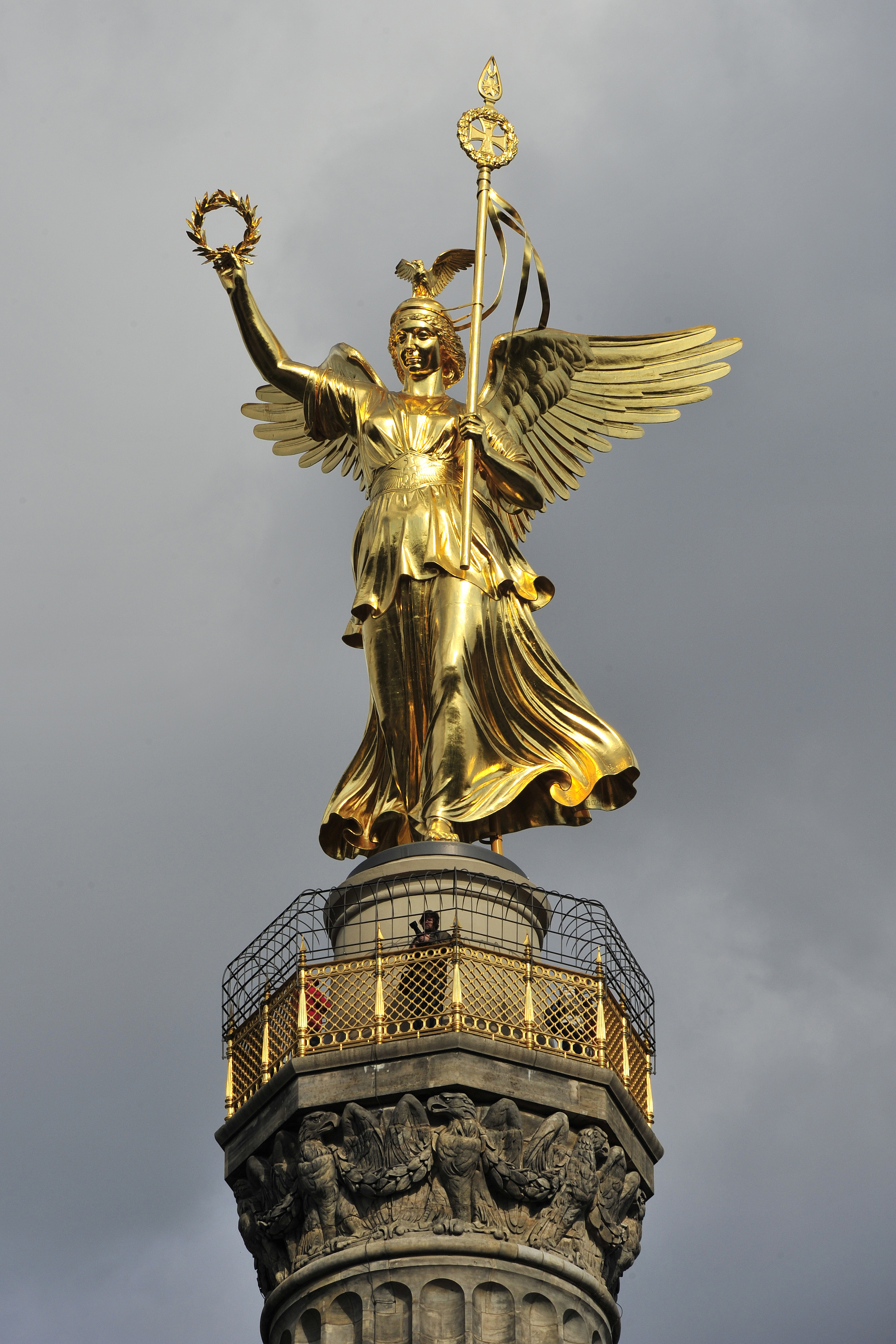
Winged Victory detail

The base consists of polished red Swedish granite, measuring 18.8 meters square and 7.2 meters high. The base contains four bronze reliefs depicting scenes from the three victories. Measuring 12 meters wide and 2 meters high, they were designed by Moritz Schulz, Karl Keil, Alexander Calandrelli, and Albert Wolff. Upon the base is a round hall with 16 granite columns measuring 4.7 meters high. Along the hall's circumference is a glass mosaic designed by Anton von Werner. Four sandstone columns rise above this hall, the first three containing 20 gilded gun barrels each, 12 pounders from the Danish victory, 8 pounders from the Austrian victory, and 4 pounders from the French victory. On top of the fourth sandstone column resides the 8.52-meter-tall (28.0 ft) gilded bronze victory.

The relief decoration was removed in 1945. It was restored for the 750th anniversary of Berlin in 1987 by the French president at that time, François Mitterrand.

== Locations ==
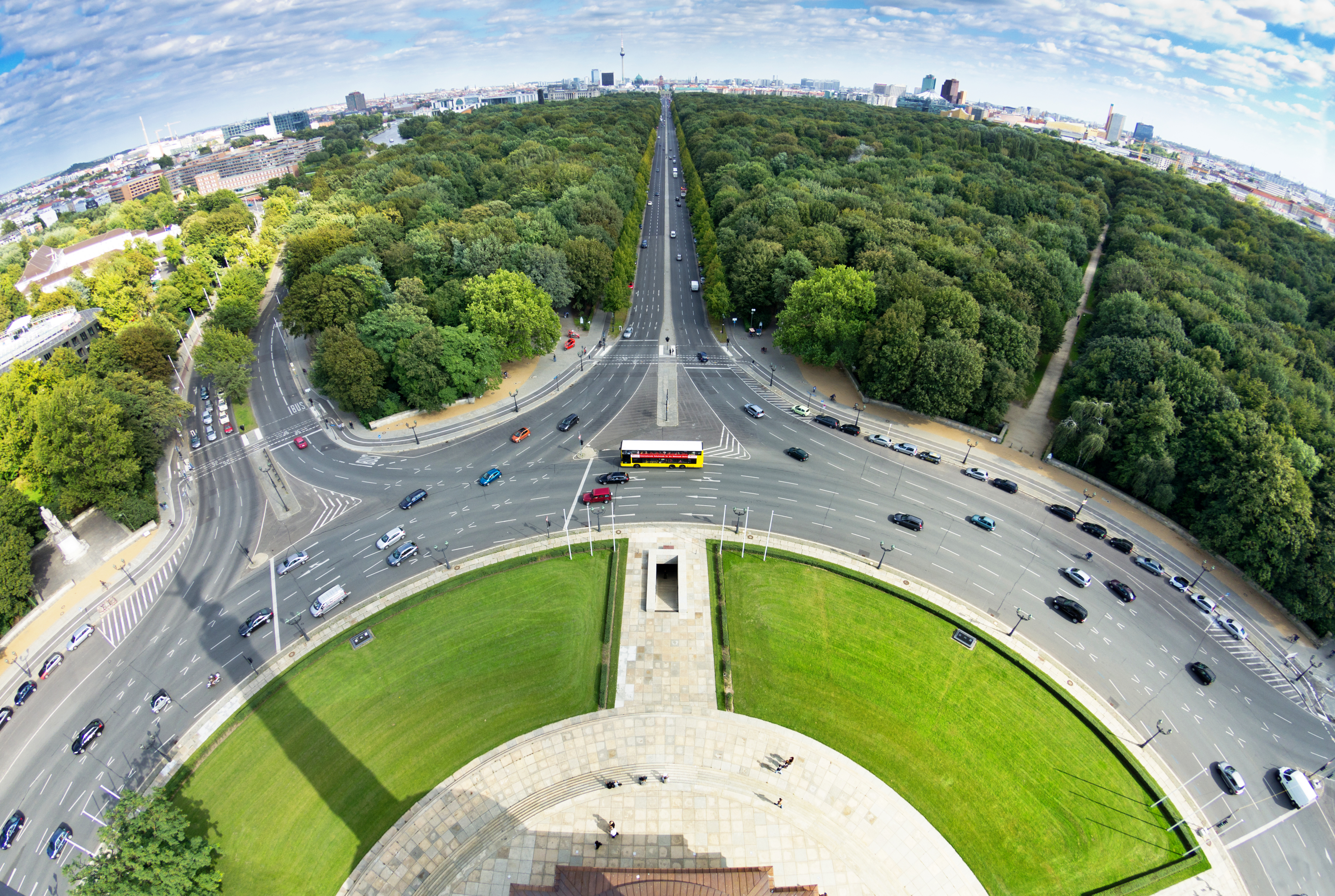
View from the platform of the Victory Column towards the Brandenburg Gate

The Victory Column originally stood in Königsplatz (now Platz der Republik). In 1938/1939, as part of the preparation of the monumental plans to redesign Berlin into Welthauptstadt Germania, the Nazis relocated the column to its present site at the Großer Stern (Great Star). At the same time, the column was augmented by another 6.5 metres, giving it its present height of 66.89 metres. The monument survived World War II without much damage. Surrounded by a roundabout, the column is also accessible to pedestrians through four tunnels, according to plans by Albert Speer. A spiral staircase leads to a viewing platform under the statue.

== History ==
=== Commission and construction ===
In 1864, King William I of Prussia commissioned a monument to the victory over Denmark in the Second Schleswig War. Its purpose subsequently broadened to commemorate the victories in the Austro-Prussian War of 1866 and the Franco-Prussian War of 1870–71, and the establishment of the German Empire. William chose to combine Heinrich Strack's design for the column with Friedrich Drake's statue of Victoria. Drake received the commission for the statue in 1869.

Construction was interrupted by the wars of 1866 and 1870, with work having resumed in 1869 between the two conflicts. The monument cost 1.8 million gold marks. William, now German Emperor, inaugurated the column on Königsplatz on 2 September 1873, the third anniversary of the victory at Sedan. At the inauguration, Anton von Werner's decoration of the colonnade was represented by a temporary oil painting on canvas, preceding its execution in mosaic. A further ceremony marking the monument's completion took place on 15 April 1876.

The historian Eckart Conze interprets the monument as celebrating national unification as a military achievement, rather than as the work of the German national movement.

=== Imperial and Weimar Berlin ===
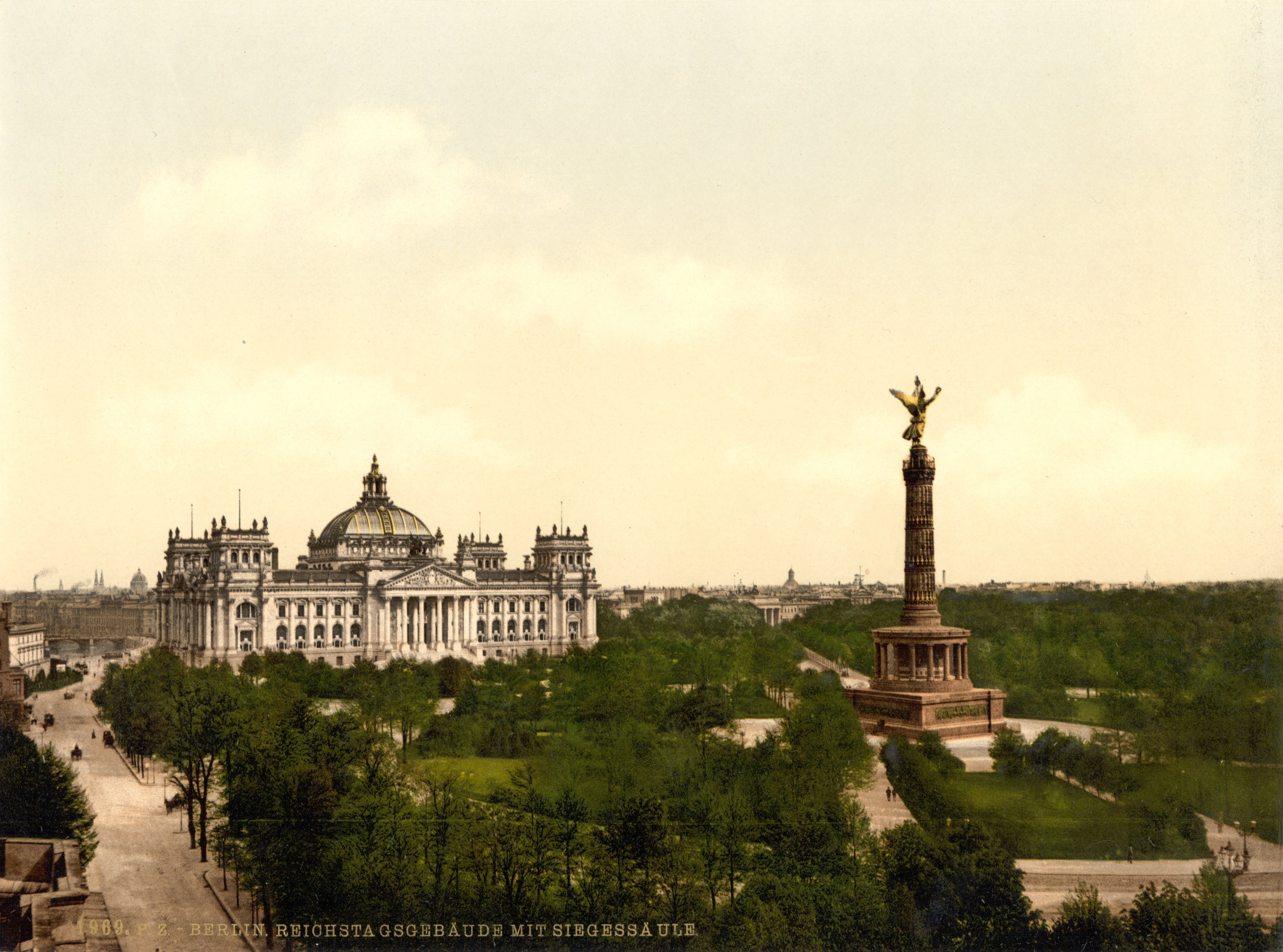
Victory Column in its original size and location, on the Königsplatz across from the Reichstag, in 1900

The setting changed with the construction of the Reichstag building beside the square between 1884 and 1894. Some National Liberals envisaged the parliament building as a peaceful counterweight to the column. The Bismarck monument was added to the square in 1901, in front of the Reichstag.

An attempted bombing of the column failed on 13 March 1921. In 1926, Königsplatz was renamed Platz der Republik. During the Weimar Republic, the column was also a meeting place for gay men.

=== Relocation under Nazi rule ===
In 1938–39, the column was moved to the Großer Stern as part of Albert Speer's plans to turn Königsplatz into a vast parade ground. The pedestal was widened and a fourth drum added to the shaft. Together with the relocated monuments to Bismarck, Moltke and Roon, it formed an ensemble commemorating the former German Empire on the planned east–west axis. The monument was rededicated at its new location on 19 April 1939.

=== War, preservation and changing uses ===
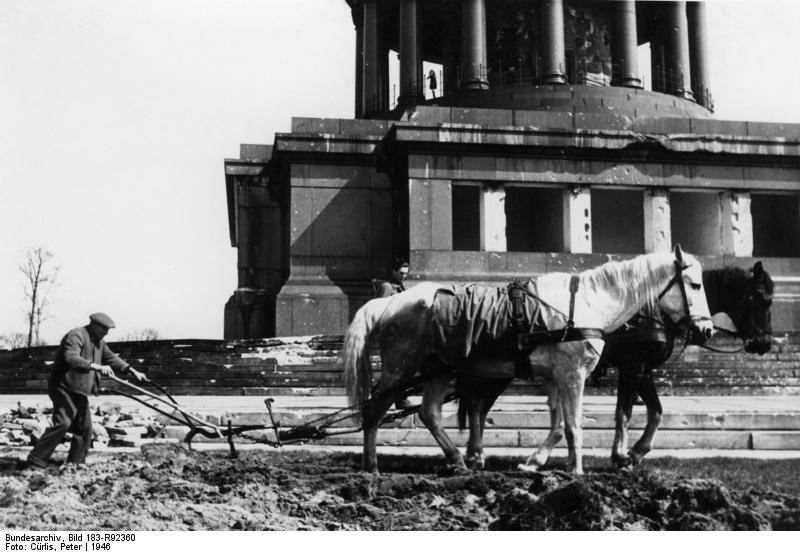
Damaged base of the Victory Column without its reliefs, 1946

The column survived the Second World War with only slight damage. During the Battle of Berlin of 1945, Soviet troops nicknamed the column "the Tall Woman". Polish Army troops, fighting alongside their Soviet allies, hoisted the Polish flag on the column on 2 May 1945 at the end of the Battle in Berlin. During the Berlin Victory Parade of 1945, the French tricolour was raised atop the column on the statue by French troops. In 1946, both the Berlin municipal authorities and the French occupation authorities sought its demolition, but their proposals were not carried out. Three of the four bronze reliefs from the pedestal were taken to Paris by French troops after the war.

Repairs began in 1951, and Victoria was regilded in 1954. Further extensive restoration took place between 1976 and 1983. The reliefs were returned from France in stages during the 1980s, with President François Mitterrand returning the remaining relief in May 1987 for Berlin's 750th anniversary. When reattached, the reliefs were deliberately left in a fragmentary condition. Alings interprets these surviving traces of damage and alteration as transforming the war memorial into a prompt for reflection on German history.

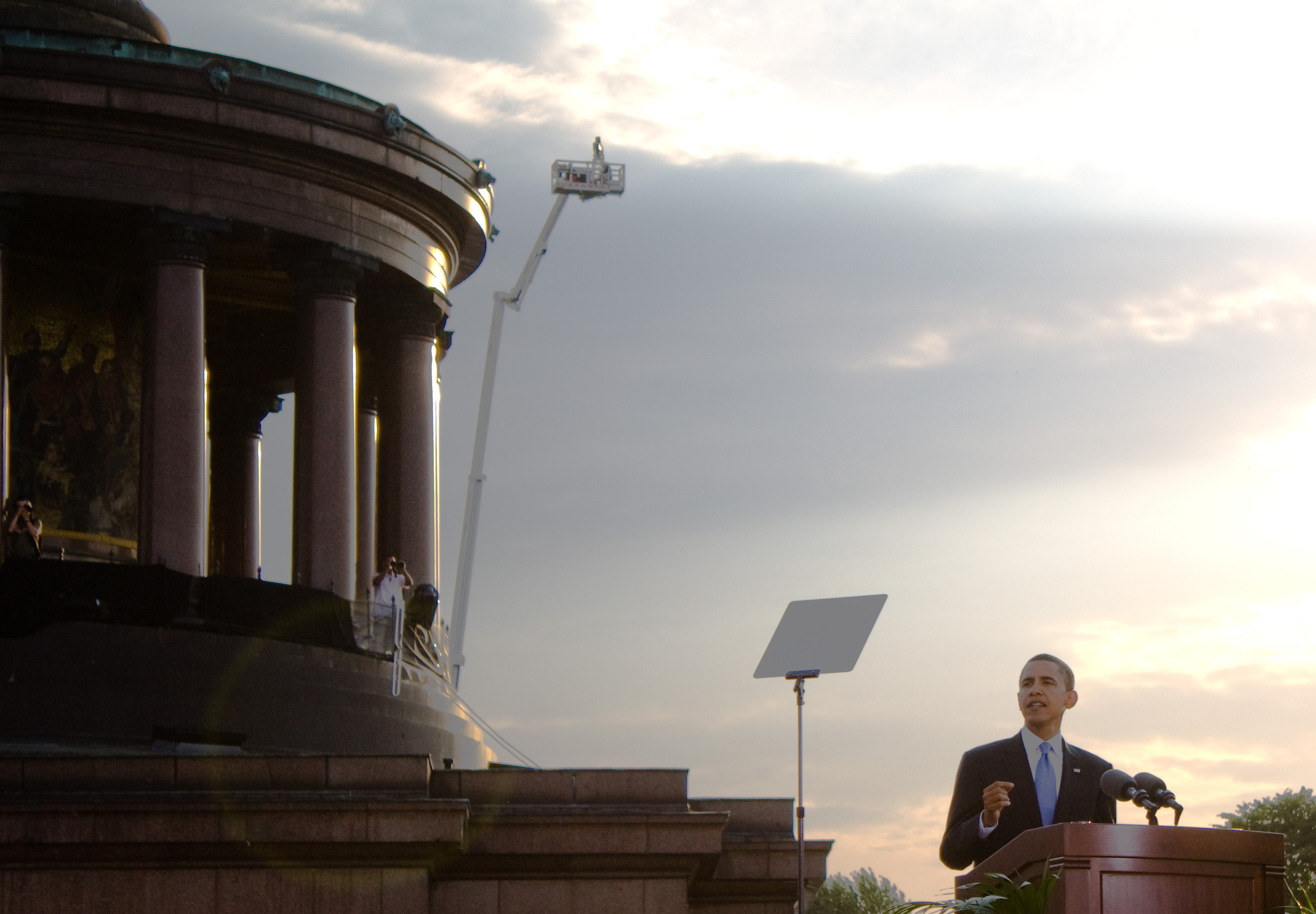
Barack Obama delivering a speech at the Victory Column on July 24, 2008

On 15 January 1991, a bomb planted beneath Victoria by members of the Revolutionary Cells exploded only partially, damaging one of the statue's supports. From the mid-1990s, the Love Parade held its closing rallies at the foot of the column. The site has also been used by Christopher Street Day and Rave the Planet parades. The Victory Column served as the location for Barack Obama's speech in Berlin as a US presidential candidate during his visit to Germany on 24 July 2008.

A further restoration campaign in 2010–11 covered the column, Victoria, the surrounding site, the pedestrian tunnels and their entrance buildings. The work cost approximately €4.3 million and included renewed gilding and the replacement of building services.

== In popular culture ==
In Wim Wenders' Wings of Desire (1987), the column is one of many high places in the city where angels sit and look down.

The golden statue atop the column, cast in 1873 by the Aktien-Gesellschaft Gladenbeck foundry in Berlin, was featured in the music video to U2's 1993 "Stay (Faraway, So Close!)", an homage to Wings of Desire.

During the years of the techno Love Parade, the column was a meeting point where large numbers of people danced together.

The Berlin queer monthly magazine Siegessäule, founded 1984 as a gay publication, was named after the monument. The Berlin Pride (CSD parade) usually includes the column on its route for the symbolism.

The monument is one of the many landmarks visited in the "Berlin Byways" course in Mario Kart Tour (since 2021), and later Mario Kart 8 Deluxe (since 2022).
