= Lanciano railway station =

Railway station in Lanciano, Italy

Lanciano

General information
- Location: Via Bergamo, Lanciano, Province of Chieti, Abruzzo; Italy
- Coordinates: 42°13′46″N 14°24′10″E
- Owner: Ferrovia Adriatico Sangritana
- Operator: Ferrovia Adriatico Sangritana
- Line: Sangritana railway (San Vito-Castel di Sangro)
- Distance: 9.200 km (5.717 mi) from San Vito-Lanciano
- Platforms: 3
- Tracks: 4
Location
- Location within Italy

Lanciano (Italian: Stazione di Lanciano) is a railway station serving the town of Lanciano, in the region of Abruzzo, Italy. The station is located on the Sangritana railway. The train services are operated by Ferrovia Adriatico Sangritana.

It is situated 2 km east, downhill of Lanciano's town centre.

There is a tectonic fault in the immediate vicinity.

== New and old stations ==
The new and current Lanciano station, situated on Via Bergamo, is managed by the regional train company, Ferrovia Adriatico Sangritana. It is a terminus station on the short branch line from San Vito-Lanciano.

The old station, situated closer to the centre of town, has been preserved. At the end of World War Two, it was used as the headquarters of 47 Field Park Company of King George's V's Own Bengal Sappers and Miners Group. It is now l, as of 2025, used as Lanciano Bus Station for shuttle bus to Lanciano (new) station and coaches to Rome-Tiburtina. It is a 5-minute walk to Lanciano's main boulevard, Corso Trento e Trieste. A single track still remains operative, but closed to passenger service, to connect Lanciano to Villa Santa Maria (both within the Province of Chieti) via Lago di Bomba (Lake Bomba).

== Shuttle bus ==
A shuttle bus service runs between Lanciano (new) station and the bus station (formerly the old railway station), known as Lanciano Centro. The timetable of this service is co-ordinated with the train times. When there are no train services during early mornings or late nights, the shuttle bus extends its operation between Lanciano and Pescara Centrale Bus Station (outside the railway station).

== Train services ==
The station is served by the following service(s):

- Local services (Treno regionale) San Benedetto del Tronto - Pescara - Ortona - San Vito - Lanciano

== See also ==
- History of rail transport in Italy
- List of railway stations in Abruzzo
- Rail transport in Italy
- Railway stations in Italy
