= Sant'Onofrio, Abruzzo =

Sant'Onofrio, Abruzzo may refer to:

- Sant'Onofrio, Campli, Province of Teramo
- Sant'Onofrio, Lanciano, Province of Chieti
- Hermitage of Sant'Onofrio, Serramonacesca, Province of Pescara
- Hermitage of Sant'Onofrio al Morrone, Sulmona, Province of L'Aquila
