= Lanciano =

Lanciano Langiàne (Neapolitan)
- Comune
- Città di Lanciano
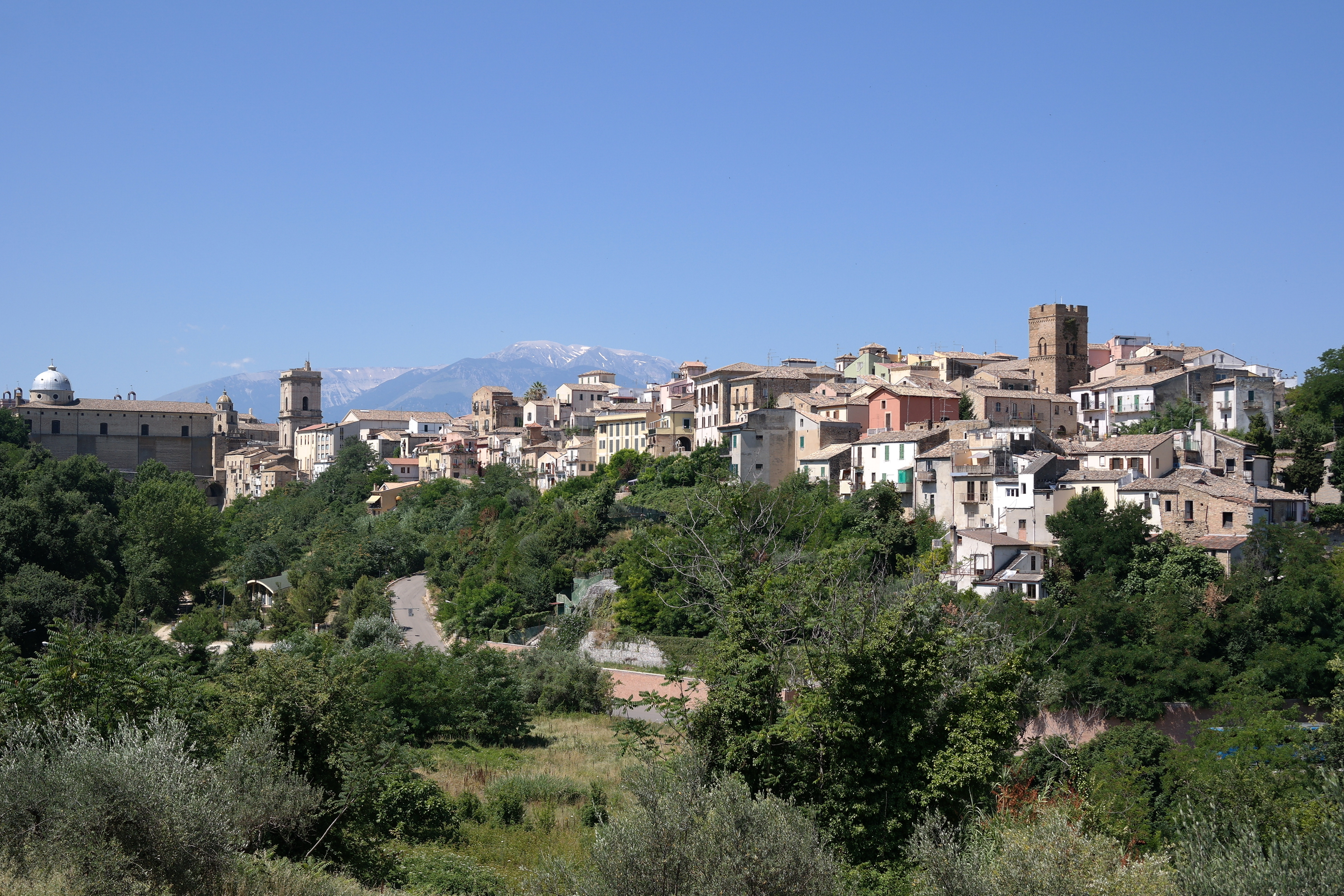
- Historical centre of Lanciano.

- Flag Coat of arms

- Location within Italy Location within Abruzzo
- Coordinates: 42°14′N 14°23′E
- Country: Italy
- Region: Abruzzo
- Province: Chieti (CH)
- Frazioni: Camicie, Colle Campitelli, Colle Pizzuto, Costa di Chieti, Follani, Fontanelle, Gaeta, Iconicella, Madonna del Carmine, Marcianese, Nasuti, Re di Coppe, Rizzacorno, Sabbioni, San Iorio, San Nicolino, Santa Croce, Santa Giusta, Santa Liberata, Santa Maria dei Mesi, Sant'Amato, Sant'Egidio, Sant'Onofrio, Serre, Serroni, Spaccarelli, Torre Marino, Torre Sansone, Villa Andreoli, Villa Carminello, Villa Elce, Villa Martelli, Villa Pasquini, Villa Stanazzo

Government
  - Mayor: Filippo Paolini

Area
  - Total: 66 km^{2} (25 sq mi)
- Elevation: 265 m (869 ft)

Population (2019)
  - Total: 34,791
  - Density: 530/km^{2} (1,400/sq mi)
- Demonym: Lancianesi
- Time zone: UTC+1 (CET)
  - Summer (DST): UTC+2 (CEST)
- Postal code: 66034
- Dialing code: 0872
- Patron saint: Madonna del Ponte
- Saint day: September 16
- Website: Official website

Lanciano (Italian pronunciation: [lanˈtʃaːno]; Abruzzese: Langiàne [lanˈdʒɑːnə]) is a town and comune in the province of Chieti, part of the Abruzzo region of central Italy. It has 33,944 inhabitants as of 2023. The town is known for the first recorded Catholic Eucharistic Miracle. Lanciano is located about 10 kilometres (6.2 mi) from the Adriatic Sea in an elevated spot.

== Geography ==
The town is located on hills and its town territory covers 66 square kilometres (25 mi^{2}) from Val di Sangro to Castelfrentano, and its elevation is about 265 metres (869 ft) above sea level.

It is bordered by Atessa, Castel Frentano, Fossacesia, Frisa, Mozzagrogna, Orsogna, Paglieta, Poggiofiorito, Rocca San Giovanni, San Vito Chietino, Sant'Eusanio del Sangro and Treglio.

Regarding the climate, the temperature averages about 4 °C (39 °F) in winter and 25 °C (77 °F) in summer. It usually snows about three times a year. During the summer there can be sultry days.

== History ==
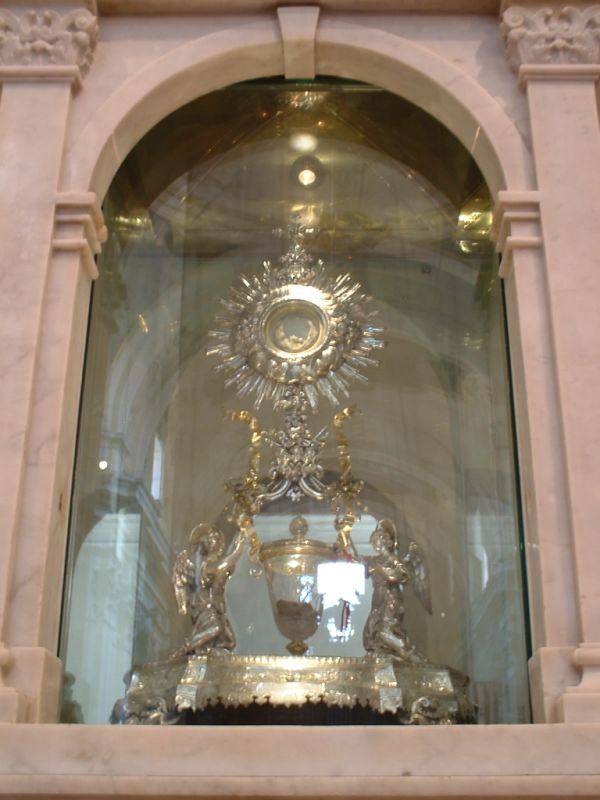
Eucharistic Miracle of Lanciano in the Santuario di San Francesco

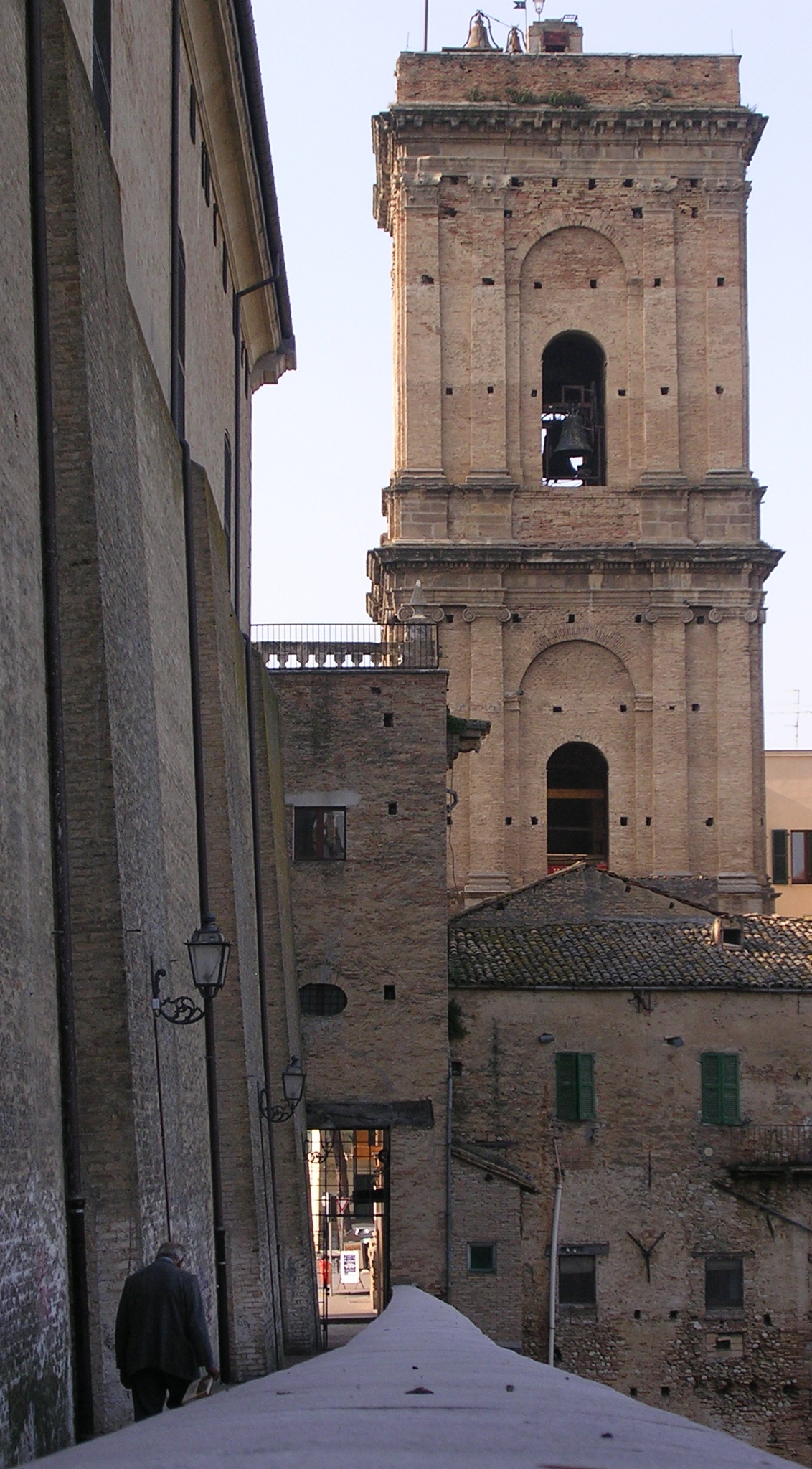
Basilica's bell tower and Ponte Diocleziano

The ancient Roman name of Lanciano was Anxanum, a city of the Frentani Italic tribe. The city is said to have been founded in 1181 BC by Solimus, a Trojan refugee arrived in Italy along with Aeneas. Legends aside, archaeological findings have shown that the area was settled from the 5th millennium BC.

Under the Frentani it was probably under the influence of Greater Greece. After the end of the Samnite Wars, which saw the Frentani allied with the Romans, Lancianum obtained the status of municipium. It was probably a flourishing commercial site, across an ancient and important trade route connecting Pescara to Apulia.

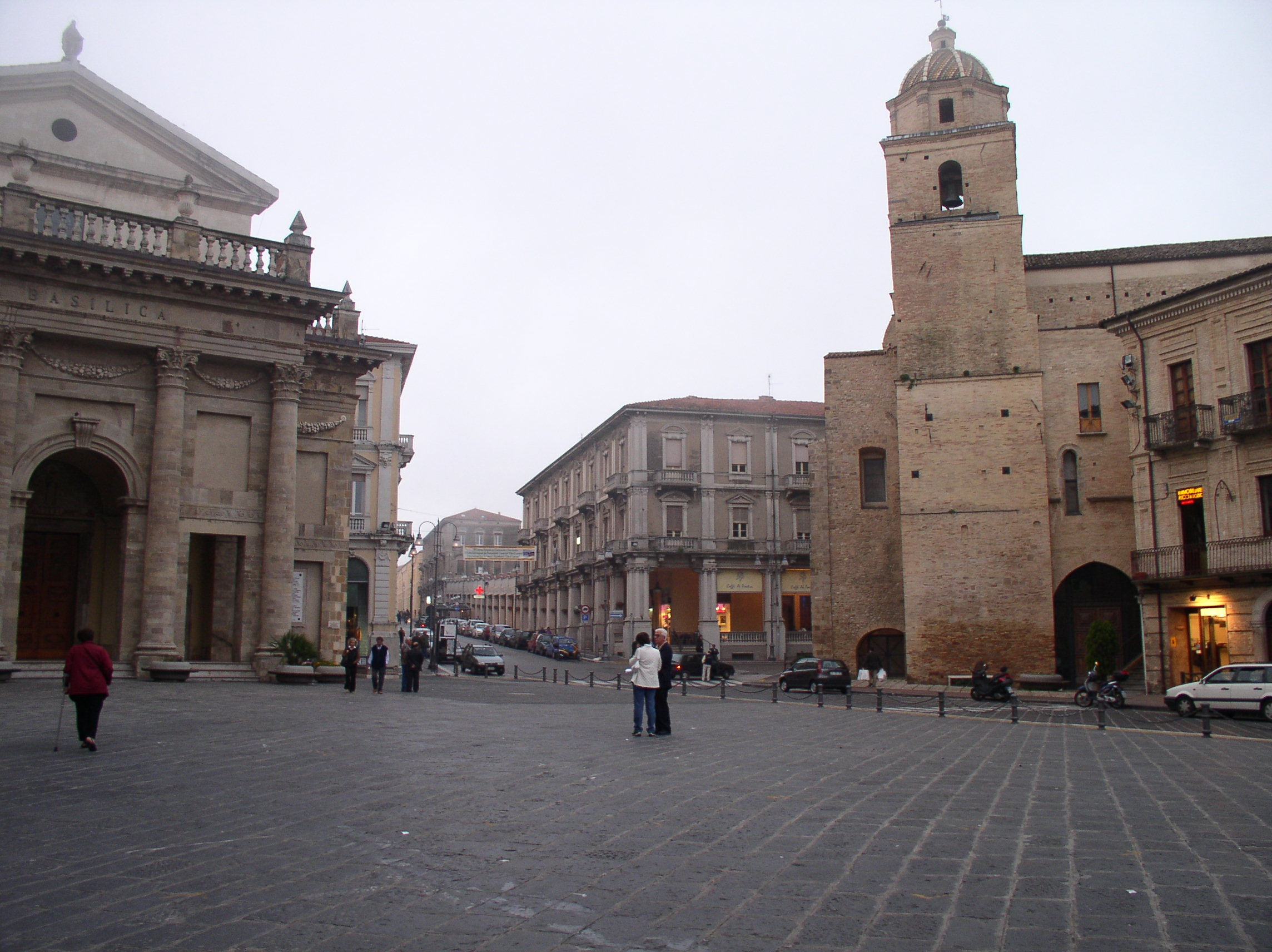
Plebiscite Square in Lanciano.

During the fall of the Western Roman Empire, Lanciano was sacked by the Goths, and was destroyed during the Lombard invasion (c. 571 AD). A new settlement was then created around a castle built by the new rulers. In 610, however, it was conquered by the Byzantines, who annexed it to the Duchy of Teate (Chieti) and allowed the trades to restart. In the late 8th century Lanciano was conquered by the Franks, who included it in the Duchy of Spoleto.

In 1060 the Normans made it a centre of the unified Kingdom of Sicily. Lanciano flourished again and in 1340 it was the largest city in Abruzzo with 6,500 inhabitants, renowned industries (ceramics, wool, silk, goldworks, ironworks), receiving important privileges by both Frederick II and his son Manfred, with a substantial administrative autonomy. Charles I, King of Sicily, assigned the revenues of the city's port to the Vatican Basilica. Later it was frequently at war with nearby Ortona.

It was here that Pope Gregory XII, fleeing from Cividale, landed on Neapolitan territory (1409), and went thence to Gaeta. After the end of the Italian Wars, the new Spanish rule and the shift of commerce due to the discovery of America impoverished Lanciano, which, in 1640, became a baronial possession.

Later, the city took the part of the Neapolitan Republic of 1799 and rose against the Bourbon kings in 1848, 1849 and 1853. In 1860 it voted for annexation to the newly formed Kingdom of Italy.

During World War II it was an active center of the Resistance against the German occupation. On 6 October 1943 Italian citizens attacked German soldiers (revolt of the martyrs of October 1943). In 1952 it was awarded the Gold Medal to Military Valour by President Luigi Einaudi.

== Monuments and sites of interest ==
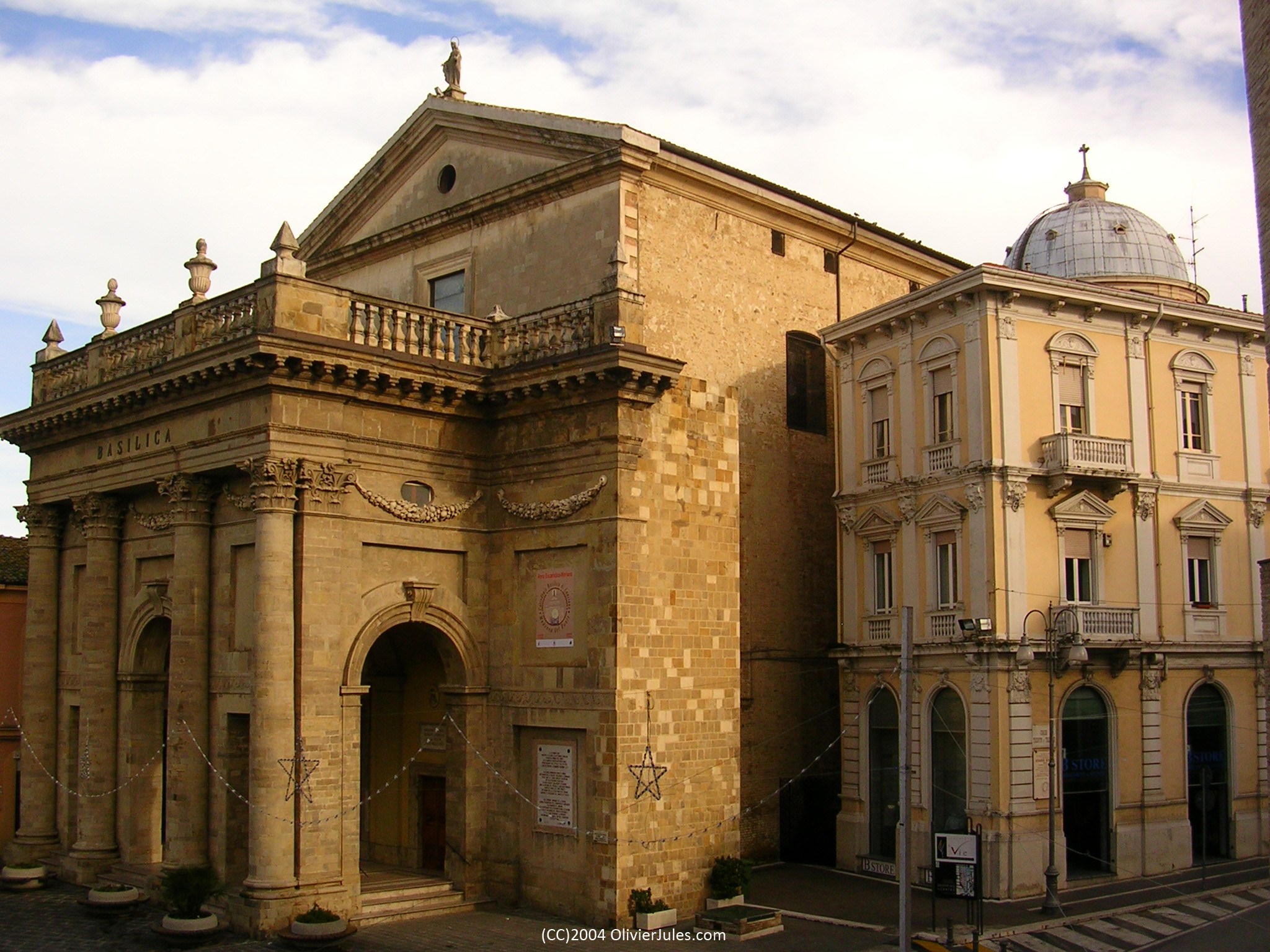
The Basilica of Santa Maria del Ponte in Lanciano.

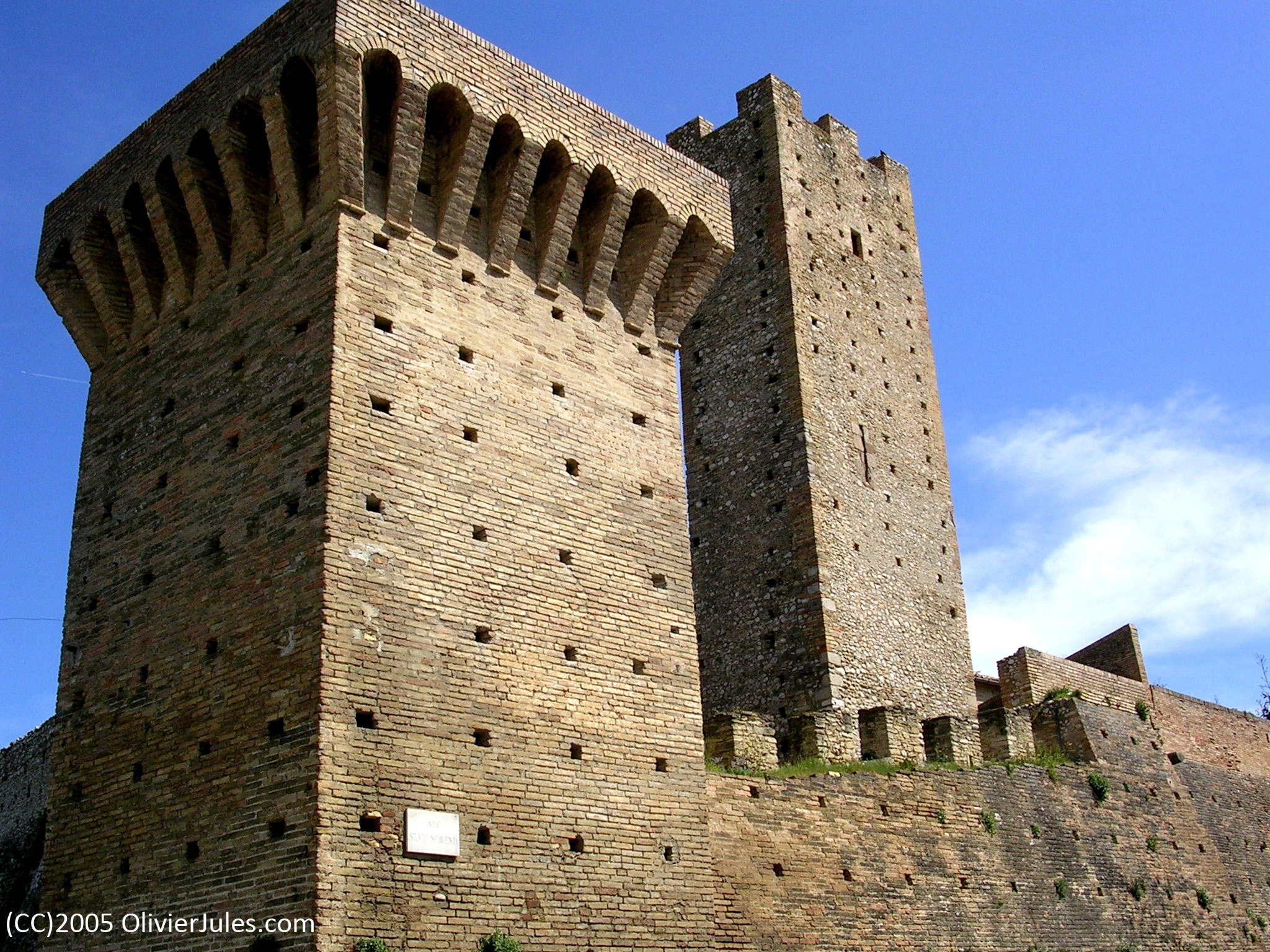
The Torri Montanare.

=== Religious architecture or sites ===
- Cathedral of Santa Maria del Ponte ("St. Mary of the Bridge"), so called because it is built on bridgework along a precipice: is the work of Michitelli (1619) and has some paintings by Pozzulaniello (Giacinto Diana). It houses also an 8th-century Byzantine statue portraying the Madonna, probably brought here during the iconoclast controversy.
- Santa Maria Maggiore: 13th-century Gothic-style church: in the 19th century; the interior was stripped of Baroque stucco-work, accentuating gothic ribbed vaults. Decorated ogival portal dates to 1317.
- San Francesco (1258): church built over a pre-existing 7th-century temple. The high altar houses the relics of the local Eucharistic Miracle.
- Sant'Agostino (1270): church façade has maintained the original rose window and the gate, while the single nave interior is a Baroque restoration.
- San Biagio (11th century): oldest church of the city. It has a bell tower and it's always opened on 3 February for the anointing of the throat, a Catholic rite linked to the cult Saint Biagio.

=== Secular architecture or sites ===
- Porta San Biagio (11th century), the only one gate remaining of the nine once existing.
- Torri Montanare, a relic of the ancient walls (11th century). They consist in two massive towers, the most recent dating to the 15th century, offering a panoramic view of the area.
- Torre civica (19th century), was built over a pre-existing tower next to the cathedral. Nowadays it is a belfry and a clock tower.
- Torre Aragonese, (15th century) was a tower along the ancient walls.
- Palazzo dell'Arcivescovado, (16th century) is still the seat of the archbishop and houses a diocesan Museum.
- Botteghe medievali, was a house built in 1434. It has two floors and on the ground floor there are antique shops, with external bank according to the Roman use.

== Transport ==
- Lanciano railway station
- San Vito-Lanciano railway station

== Honours ==
- Gold Medal of Military Valor.

== Subdivisions ==
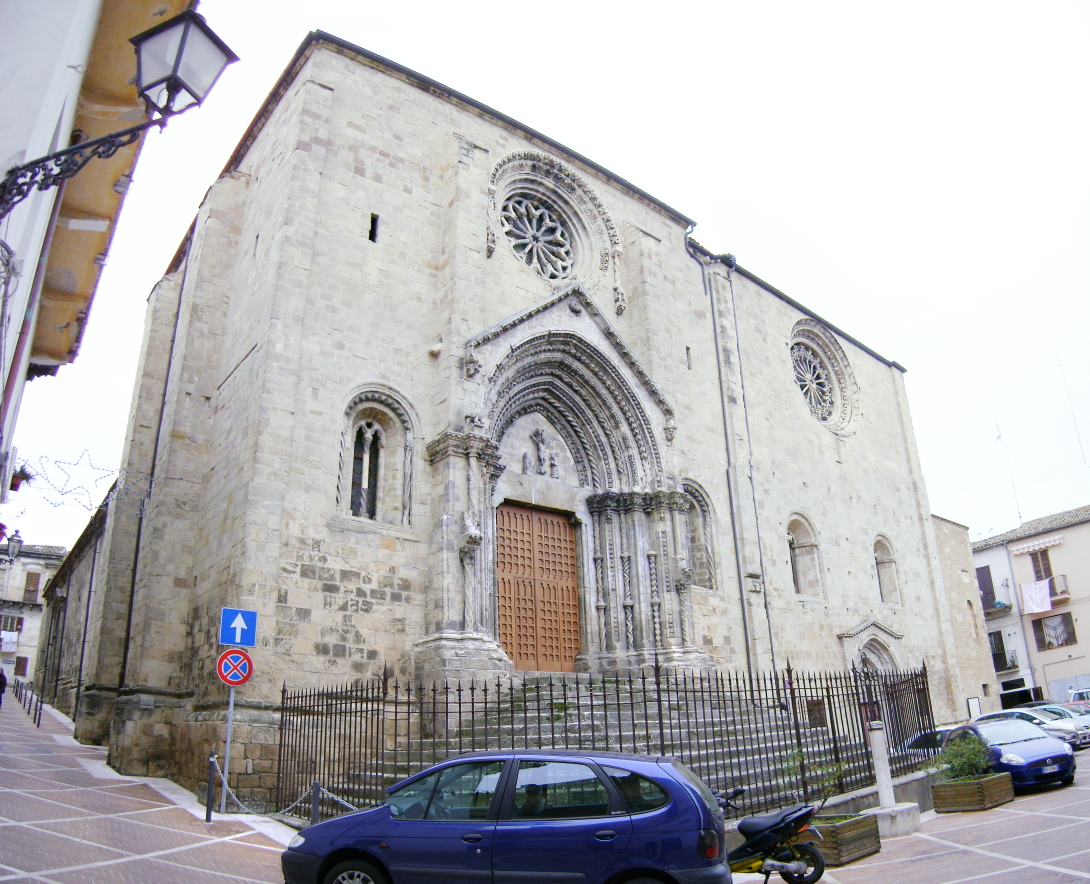
Church of Santa Maria Maggiore

Apart from the city of Lanciano, the comune (municipality) of the same name contains 33 contrade. The population of the contrade has been estimated (as of 2005) at 12,682.

They are: Camicie, Colle Campitelli, Colle Pizzuto, Costa di Chieti, Follani, Fontanelle, Gaeta, Iconicella, Madonna del Carmine, Marcianese, Nasuti, re di Coppe, Rizzacorno, Sabbioni, San Iorio, Santa Croce, Santa Giusta, Santa Liberata, Santa Maria dei Mesi, Sant'Amato, Santa Nicolina, Sant'Egidio, Sant'Onofrio, Serre, Serroni, Spaccarelli, Torremarino, Torre Sansone, Villa Andreoli, Villa Carminello, Villa Elce, Villa Martelli, Villa Pasquini, Villa Stanazzo.

== Education ==
Canadian College Italy is located in Lanciano. There are also other schools, from nursery to high schools. As far as high schools are concerned lanciano has a liceo scientifico, a liceo classico, a liceo delle scienze umane, a liceo artistico, a liceo linguistico, a liceo economico sociale, a ragioneria, a geometra, an istituto tecnico industriale and an istituto tecnico professionale. Lanciano has 4 secondary schools and 8 primary schools and two of those are private schools led by two different nunneries.

== Notable people ==
- Camillo Pace (Paglieta, 1862–1948), Protestant pastor.
- Francesco Morone (born 1956), professional fingerstyle guitar player.
- Dario Cataldo (born 1985), professional cyclist and winner of the Queen Stage of the 2012 Vuelta a España.
- Santino Spinelli (born 1964, Lucca), Italian musician, composer and teacher.
- Trentino La Barba (1915–1943), Italian soldier and resistance fighter in World War II
- Ettore Verna (1892–1962), Italian operatic baritone and voice teacher

== Twinnings ==
- Berazategui, Argentina
- Qala, Malta, since 2005
- Perho, Finland
- Vaughan, Ontario, Canada, since 2002
- Visegrád, Hungary, since 2006

== Climate ==
Climate data for Lanciano, elevation 283 m (928 ft), (1951–2000)
Month	Jan	Feb	Mar	Apr	May	Jun	Jul	Aug	Sep	Oct	Nov	Dec	Year
Record high °C (°F)	22.0 (71.6)	24.8 (76.6)	29.0 (84.2)	29.9 (85.8)	34.0 (93.2)	37.0 (98.6)	39.5 (103.1)	40.5 (104.9)	37.1 (98.8)	31.0 (87.8)	27.6 (81.7)	23.2 (73.8)	40.5 (104.9)
Mean daily maximum °C (°F)	9.5 (49.1)	10.7 (51.3)	13.3 (55.9)	17.0 (62.6)	21.9 (71.4)	25.8 (78.4)	28.7 (83.7)	28.6 (83.5)	24.8 (76.6)	19.4 (66.9)	14.2 (57.6)	10.8 (51.4)	18.7 (65.7)
Daily mean °C (°F)	6.4 (43.5)	7.1 (44.8)	9.4 (48.9)	12.6 (54.7)	17.3 (63.1)	21.0 (69.8)	23.7 (74.7)	23.7 (74.7)	20.2 (68.4)	15.5 (59.9)	10.9 (51.6)	7.7 (45.9)	14.6 (58.3)
Mean daily minimum °C (°F)	3.3 (37.9)	3.5 (38.3)	5.5 (41.9)	8.3 (46.9)	12.6 (54.7)	16.2 (61.2)	18.8 (65.8)	18.7 (65.7)	15.6 (60.1)	11.6 (52.9)	7.5 (45.5)	4.6 (40.3)	10.5 (50.9)
Record low °C (°F)	−8.2 (17.2)	−6.0 (21.2)	−5.5 (22.1)	−1.8 (28.8)	1.0 (33.8)	8.0 (46.4)	10.0 (50.0)	9.8 (49.6)	7.0 (44.6)	1.0 (33.8)	−6.2 (20.8)	−6.0 (21.2)	−8.2 (17.2)
Average precipitation mm (inches)	78.1 (3.07)	65.4 (2.57)	71.2 (2.80)	62.3 (2.45)	39.9 (1.57)	46.0 (1.81)	44.3 (1.74)	51.3 (2.02)	70.1 (2.76)	89.6 (3.53)	92.3 (3.63)	90.4 (3.56)	800.9 (31.51)
Average precipitation days	7.0	6.8	7.2	5.9	5.4	4.7	3.8	4.4	5.4	7.1	8.0	8.1	73.8
Source: Regione Abruzzo

== See also ==
- Roman Catholic Archdiocese of Lanciano-Ortona
- Miracle of Lanciano
