= Trentino La Barba =

Italian soldier (1915–1943)

- Born: 12 August 1915; Lanciano, Kingdom of Italy
- Died: 5 October 1943 (aged 28); Lanciano, Italian Social Republic
- Military career
- Allegiance: Kingdom of Italy
- Branch: Royal Italian Army
- Service years: 1940–1943
- Rank: Private
- Conflicts: World War II
- Awards: Gold Medal of Military Valour (posthumous)

Trentino La Barba (12 August 1915 – 5 October 1943) was an Italian soldier and Resistance fighter during World War II.

== Biography ==
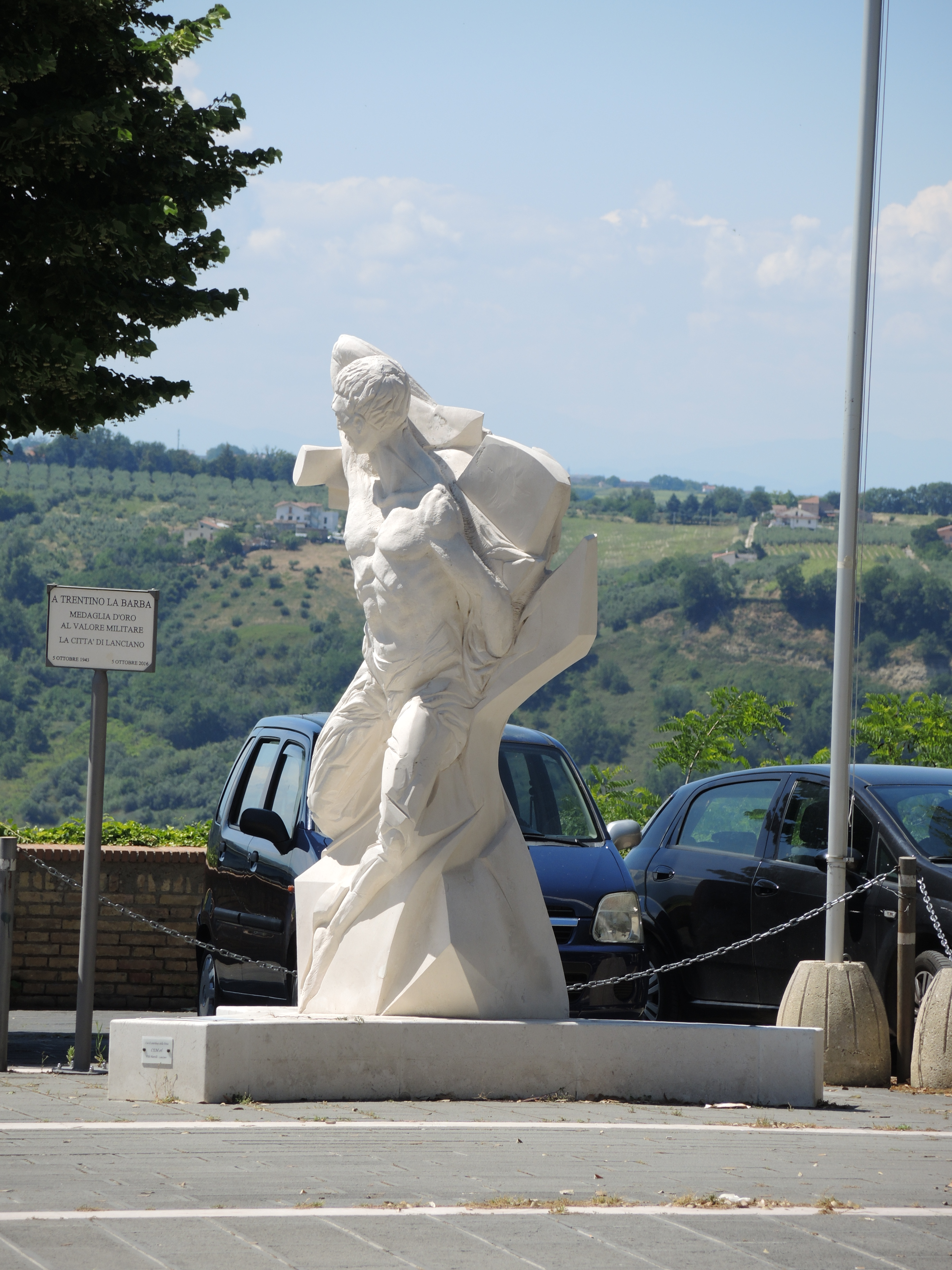
Monument to Trentino La Barba in Lanciano

He was born into a family of farmers, and in civilian life he was a ropemaker; in April 1938 he was called up for military service and assigned to the 14th Infantry Regiment "Pinerolo", and later (from July 1939) to the 9th Machine Gunner Battalion, with which he was sent to Albania. In March 1940 he was transferred to the 21st Machine Gunner Battalion of the 226th Infantry Regiment, 53rd Infantry Division "Arezzo", participating in the Greco-Italian War from October 1940 to April 1941, when he was repatriated due to an illness. After recovering, he resumed service in September 1942 at the regimental depot in Molfetta, near Bari. There he and his unit were captured by German troops after Italy signed the armistice of Cassibile on September 8, 1943, but during the voyage towards captivity in Germany he was able to escape and return to his hometown of Lanciano, Abruzzo.

There he joined the Italian resistance movement, and was among the founders and organizers of the "Gran Sasso" resistance group. At the beginning of October 1943, he and some comrades raided the local Carabinieri, MVSN and Guardia di Finanza barracks, where they stole weapons with which La Barba's group attacked and dispersed a German column near Pozzo Bagnaro on October 4. After another attack on a military column, he was captured and tortured without success in the attempt to force him to reveal the names and whereabouts of the other partisans from his group. In order to intimidate the population, he was taken to Lanciano, where he was tied to a tree in one of the town's main streets and given an ultimatum to reveal the names of the leaders of the local resistance group. After his refusal, German soldiers cut out his eyes in front of the assembled townspeople and then shot him dead, after which they hanged his body from the tree. A few hours later, an uprising against the German occupiers broke out in Lanciano, in which forty-seven German soldiers and eleven partisans were killed; a further twelve civilians were subsequently killed by the Germans in reprisal. La Barba was posthumously awarded the Gold Medal of Military Valor.
