= Hermann Geitner =

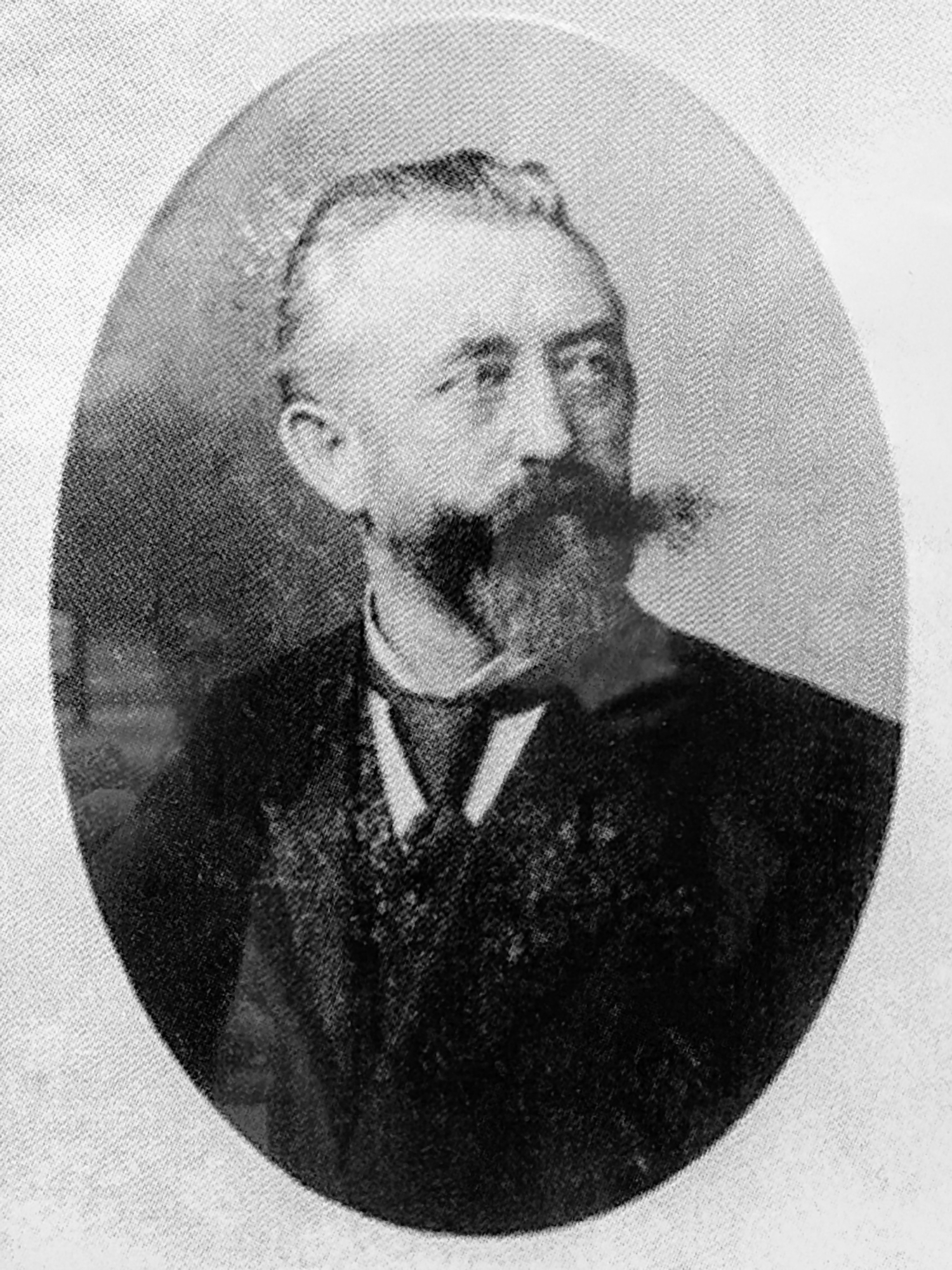

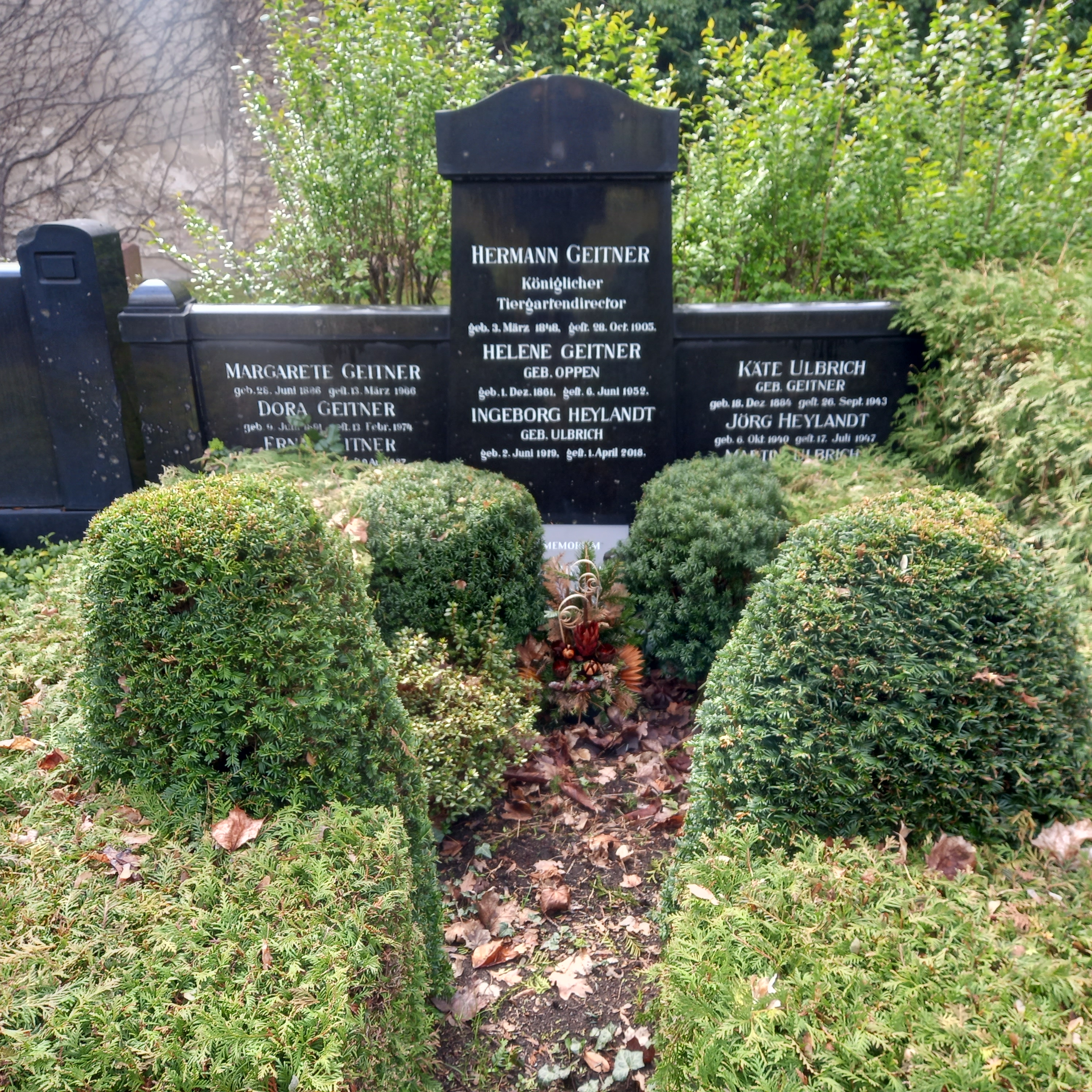
Tomb of Hermann Geitner at Dorotheenstadt Cemetery II in Berlin

Hermann Geitner (3 March 1848 - 20 October 1905) was a German garden planner and a prominent director of the Royal Garden in Berlin.

Geitner was the son of a porcelain manufacturer in Althaldensleben near Magdeburg. He trained in gardening and nursery techniques under Johann Gottlob Nathusius and then travelled around Europe. After the Franco-Prussian war he returned and was recruited by Eduard Neide, the director of the Tiergarten as an assistant. He worked on various improvements to the garden and was recommended for the position of head gardener in 1880. He then set up several ornamental gardens including the ones in Luiseninsel and at Goethe's monument in Berlin. He began to design parks and public spaces with conveniences around Berlin. He laid out avenue trees and monuments were carefully bordered by hedges.

Geitner believed in open spaces for the public and was opposed by those who favoured the retention of forests.
