= Ferrovia Adriatico Sangritana =

Ferrovia Adriatico Sangritana S.p.A.
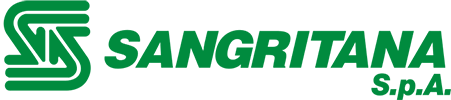
- Type: Società per azioni
- Predecessor: Ferrovie Adriatico Appenino
- Founded: 11 April 2000
- Headquarters: Lanciano, Italy
- Area served: Abruzzo, Italy
- Products: Public transport Passenger railway transport
- Number of employees: 360
- Website: sangritana.it

Ferrovia Adriatico Sangritana (FAS), also known as Ferrovia Sangritana, is a private transport company of Italy operating train services in the Abruzzo region. The company is owned by the region of Abruzzo. The company is a railway undertaking and an infrastructure manager. The company was previously known as Ferrovie Adriatico Appenino.

As a railway company, the company extends its interest in the freight sector serving as a carrier even outside of their own network on the routes of RFI. The company has also taken over the management of provincial and inter-regional bus services. The company also manages some important industrial and port connections in the province of Abruzzo.

== Lines ==
=== Sangritana railway ===
The company manages the Sangritana railway. A new line was built between San Vito Chietino and Lanciano, which meant the old line with many curves was closed. The new line also means direct trains can operate from Lanciano to Pescara. The line between Lanciano and Castel di Sangro is currently closed, waiting to be rebuilt.

=== Saletti-Archi railway ===
There is a branch line used for freight services transporting vans for Sevel between Fossacesia and Saletti. A line is under construction from Saletti to Archi, which will connect with the Sangritana railway.

== Train services ==
The company provides local rail services between Lanciano, San Vito, Pescara, Termoli and Giulianova, with a branch to Teramo.

== Fleet ==
Class	Image	Cars per set	Type	Top speed		Number	Builder	Built
Class	Image	Cars per set	Type	km/h	mph	Number	Builder	Built
ALn 776		1	Diesel multiple unit	150	93	5	Fiat Ferroviaria	1985-1987, 1990-1991
ALe 01		1	Electric multiple unit	75	47	10	OMS/TIBB	1955-1960
ALe 056		2	Electric multiple unit	150	93	5	La Brugeoise et Nivelles	1956-
ALe 501		3	Electric multiple unit	160	99	4	Alstom	2005
D.343		N/A	Diesel locomotive	130	81	3	OM, Sofer, Omeca	1967-1970
DE 500		N/A	Diesel locomotive	75	47	2	TIBB	1977
D.752		N/A	Diesel locomotive	100	62	8	CKD	1973-1976
22-25		N/A	Electric locomotive	45	28	4	TIBB	1924-1925
E.483		N/A	Electric locomotive	140	87	2	Bombardier	2012

== Depots ==
- Lanciano (closed)
- Treglio
- Saletti
