= Santino Spinelli =

Italian musician, composer and teacher

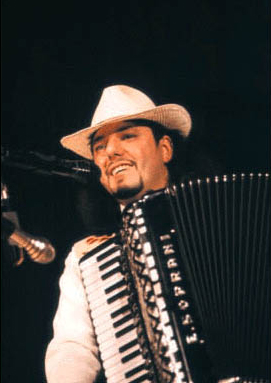
Santino Spinelli

Santino Spinelli (born 21 July 1964), also known professionally as Alexian, is an Italian Romani musician, composer and teacher.

== Biography ==
Spinelli is the youngest of six children, the only brother among five sisters. He was born in Pietrasanta, in the province of Lucca, on July 21, 1964, the son of Gennaro and Giulia Spinelli. However, it was in Lanciano, in the province of Chieti, where he began his early studies. He attended the State Trade Institute P. De Giorgio and earned two degrees from the University of Bologna, the first in Foreign Languages and Literature and the second in Musicology. He has been Professor of the Romani Language and Culture at the University of Chieti since 2008.

Spinelli is the founder and president of the cultural association Thèm Romano (Romani World). In 2001 he was elected sole representative for Italy at the parliament of the International Romani Union (IRU), a nongovernmental organization based in Latvia and active in the field of Roma people's rights. He is actually Vice President of IRU. In 2002 Spinelli taught the Romani language and culture at the University of Trieste, and later at the Polytechnic University of Turin. In 2003 the IRU Parliament appointed him Ambassador of Romani Culture and Art throughout the world, and in 2007 he was appointed Vice President of the IRU. He is the national president of the federation FederArteRom and UCRI spokesman.

Spinelli's poem "Auschwitz" is engraved on a memorial to the Sinti and Roma people killed during the Nazi period. The memorial is near the Bundestag in Berlin. He had a similar memorial built in Lanciano, in the piazzale Edith Stein. It was sculpted from Majella stone by sculptor Tonino Santeusanio.

In 2010 he published the "Carovana Romanì" for accordion, ensemble and orchestra through Ut Orpheus of Bologna. The collection contains scores composed by Spinelli that were performed at the seat of the Council of Europe in Strasbourg and the Council of the European Union in Brussels. On June 2, 2012, he sang the Murdevele (the "Lord's Prayer" in the Romani language) in Milan for Pope Benedict XVI on the occasion of the World Meeting of Families. On 26 October 2015, with the Alexian Group, he performed several of his compositions, including Murdevele, for Pope Francis.

On April 18, 2016, Mayor Ing. Gianfranco Lopane of Taranto conferred honorary citizenship on Spinelli. In May 2018 he was awarded the silver medal and the Diploma of the Sacred Military Constantinian Order of Saint George on the occasion of the tricentenary of the Ecclesiastical Bull of Pope Clement XI.

On February 4, 2020, President Mattarella awarded him the honor of Commander of the Order Merit of the Italian Republic.

On April 10, 2024, he performed as a soloist at Teatro alla Scala in Milan together with his son Gennaro Spinelli, soloists from the ANPI Section of Teatro alla Scala, and soloists from the Rossini Orchestra of Pesaro, as part of the celebrations for International Romani Day.

On April 4, 2025, he performed as a soloist at Teatro San Carlo in Naples, again with his son Gennaro Spinelli, soloists from Teatro San Carlo, and soloists from the Rossini Orchestra of Pesaro, for the celebrations of International Romani Day.

During the 2024/2025 academic year, he taught the Romani Language and Culture course at La Sapienza University of Rome.

== Publications ==
Poems

- Gilì Romanì (Canto Rom), Lacio Drom (Roma, 1988)
- Romanipé (Identità romanì), Solfanelli (Chieti, 1993)
- O Romano Gi! (l'Anima Rom), Edizioni Romanì (Roma, 2011)
- Gili tro gi (Canto dell'anima) Edizioni Tracce (Pescara, 2015)

Essays and other writings

- Prin©karang - Conosciamoci, incontro con la tradizione dei Rom Abruzzesi (Editrice Italica, Pescara 1994)
- Baxtaló Divès (Collezione Interface, Centro di Ricerche zingare dell'Università di Parigi, Consiglio d'Europa, 2002)
- Baro Romano Drom - la Lunga strada dei Rom, Sinti, Kalé, Manouches e Romanichals (Meltemi editore, Roma 2003)
- "Carovana Romanì" (accordion solo score) - Ut Orpheus, Bologna, 2010
- "Carovana Romanì" (ensemble score) - Ut Orpheus, Bologna, 2010
- "Carovana Romanì" (orchestral score) - Ut Orpheus, Bologna, 2010
- Rom, Genti Libere - with a preface by Moni Ovadia, Dalai Editore, Milano, 2012
- Romanò Bravalipé, the heritage of a people (2012)
- Rom, Questi Sconosciuti - with a preface by Moni Ovadia, Mimesis Edizioni, Milano, 2016
- Una Comunità da Conoscere con prefazione di Pino Nicotri (D'Abruzzo edizioni Menabò, Ortona, 2018)
- Le verità negate con prefazione di Paola Severini Melograni (Mimesis Edizioni, Milano, 2021)

Discography

- Iperfisa (City Record, Milano 1986)
- Jilò Romanò/Speranza (City Record, Milano 1988)
- Soft Jazz Fisa (City Record, Milano 1990)
- Gilì Romanì (City Record, Milano 1991)
- Gijem Gijem (Al Sur Mediaset, Francia 1996) (in allegato un libretto in italiano, inglese, francese, romaní su storia, musica e tradizioni del popolo Rom)
- 'orizzonte e la memoria (Santarcangelo dei Teatri, 1999)
- Putraddipé (Regione Abruzzo, Pescara 2000)
- Tsigane (SonoDisc, 2000)
- Dromos (Associazione Dromos, 2001)
- Romano Drom - Carovana romaní (Ethnoworld, Milano 2002)
- Mille Papaveri Rossi (Editrice A, 2003)
- Khamoro (Studio Production SAGA)
- Parovibbé/Metamorfosi (Ethnoworld, 2004)
- So me sinom/Ciò che sono (Ethnoworld, 2004)
- Tribù Italiche: Abruzzo (Edizioni EDT, World Music)
- Sulla Memoria (Audiocoop)
- Uno specchio per Alice (Colonna sonora, 2006)
- Andrè mirò Romano Gi, viaggio nella mia anima Rom (Ass. Thèm Romanó e Provincia dell'Aquila)
- Romano Thèm - Orizzonti Rom (CNI - Compagnia Nuove Indie, 2007)
- Me pase ko Murdevele - Io ac-Canto a Dio (CNI - Compagnia Nuove Indie, 2008)
- CD Porrajmos, parole in musica di F. Parente, M. Parisini, L. Ricciardi, 2010)
- Romano Simcha, La festa ebraico-rom (CNI - Compagnia Nuove Indie, 2021

Filmography

- La guerra degli Antò, di Riccardo Milani (Cecchi Gori Film, 1999)
- Storie Romane/Giravolte, di Carola Spadoni (Boccoa Film, 2000)
- Fiori di Campo, di Carlo Rota (2002)
- Baro Romanò Drom, di Gioia Meloni (Rai, 2003)
- Uno specchio per Alice, di Gianni Di Claudio (2006)
- Il Giudizio Universale, di Luca Kerstic (2006)
- Il Diavolo inventò la vanga, di Gianni Di Claudio (2007)
- Porrajmos, parole in musica, di F. Parente, M. Parisini, L. Ricciardi (2010)
- Romanistan, di L. Vitone (2019)

Theatre

- Duj Furàt Mulò (Due volte morto), dramma teatrale (Drammateatro, Popoli 1995)
- Diversamente…Orgia di Pier Paolo Pasolini, a cura di Sivio Sarta (2005)

== See also ==
- Romani people in Italy
