= Treglio =

- Comune
- Comune di Treglio
- Location within Italy Location within Abruzzo
- Coordinates: 42°16′N 14°25′E
- Country: Italy
- Region: Abruzzo
- Province: Chieti (CH)
- Frazioni: Pagliarone, Sacchetti, San Giorgio

Area
  - Total: 4.83 km^{2} (1.86 sq mi)
- Elevation: 183 m (600 ft)

Population (2008)
  - Total: 1,526
  - Density: 316/km^{2} (818/sq mi)
- Demonym: Tregliesi
- Time zone: UTC+1 (CET)
  - Summer (DST): UTC+2 (CEST)
- Postal code: 66030
- Dialing code: 0872
- ISTAT code: 069096
- Patron saint: Santa Maria Assunta, San Rocco, San Giorgio
- Saint day: 23 April, 15 August - 16 August
- Website: Official website

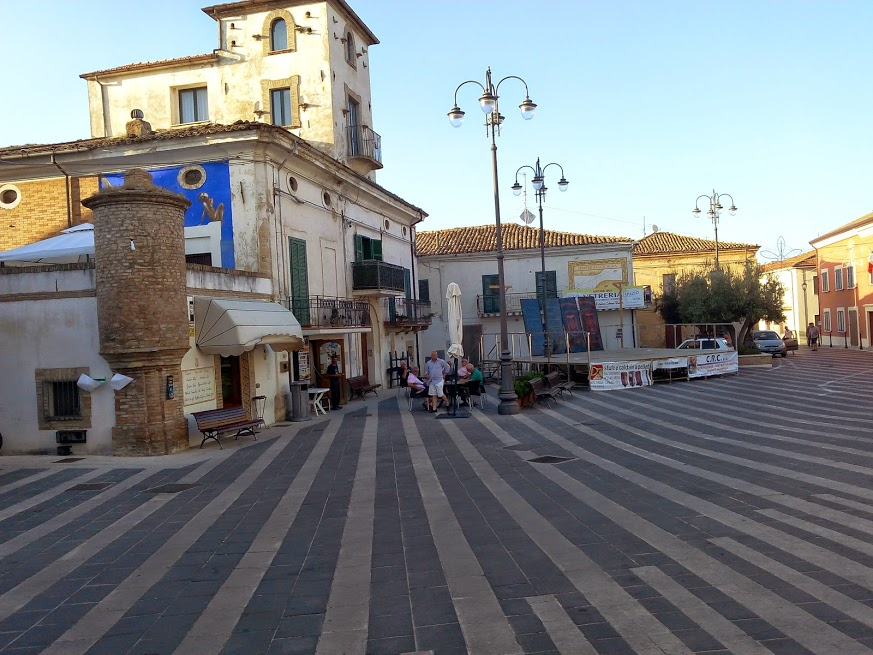
Treglio in 2014

Treglio (Abruzzese: Tréjje) is a municipality and town in the Province of Chieti in the Abruzzo region of Italy
