= Memorial to the Sinti and Roma Victims of National Socialism =

Memorial in Berlin, Germany

Coordinates: 52°31′02″N 13°22′34″E

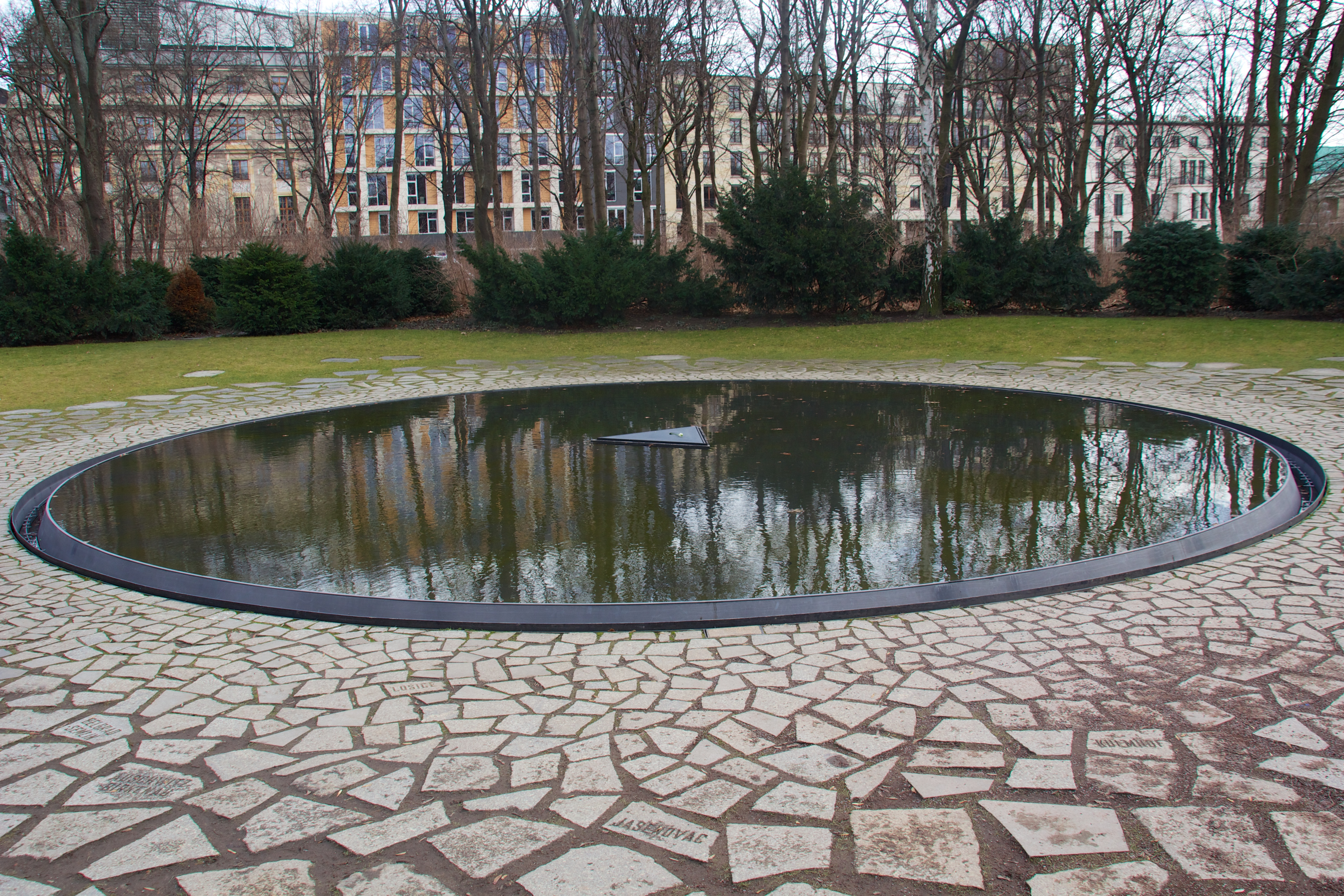
The memorial pool

The Memorial to the Sinti and Roma Victims of National Socialism (German: Denkmal für die im Nationalsozialismus ermordeten Sinti und Roma Europas) is a memorial in Berlin, Germany. The monument is dedicated to the memory of the 220,000 – 500,000 people murdered in the Porajmos – the Nazi genocide of the European Sinti and Roma peoples. It was designed by Dani Karavan and was officially opened on 24 October 2012 by German Chancellor Angela Merkel in the presence of President Joachim Gauck.

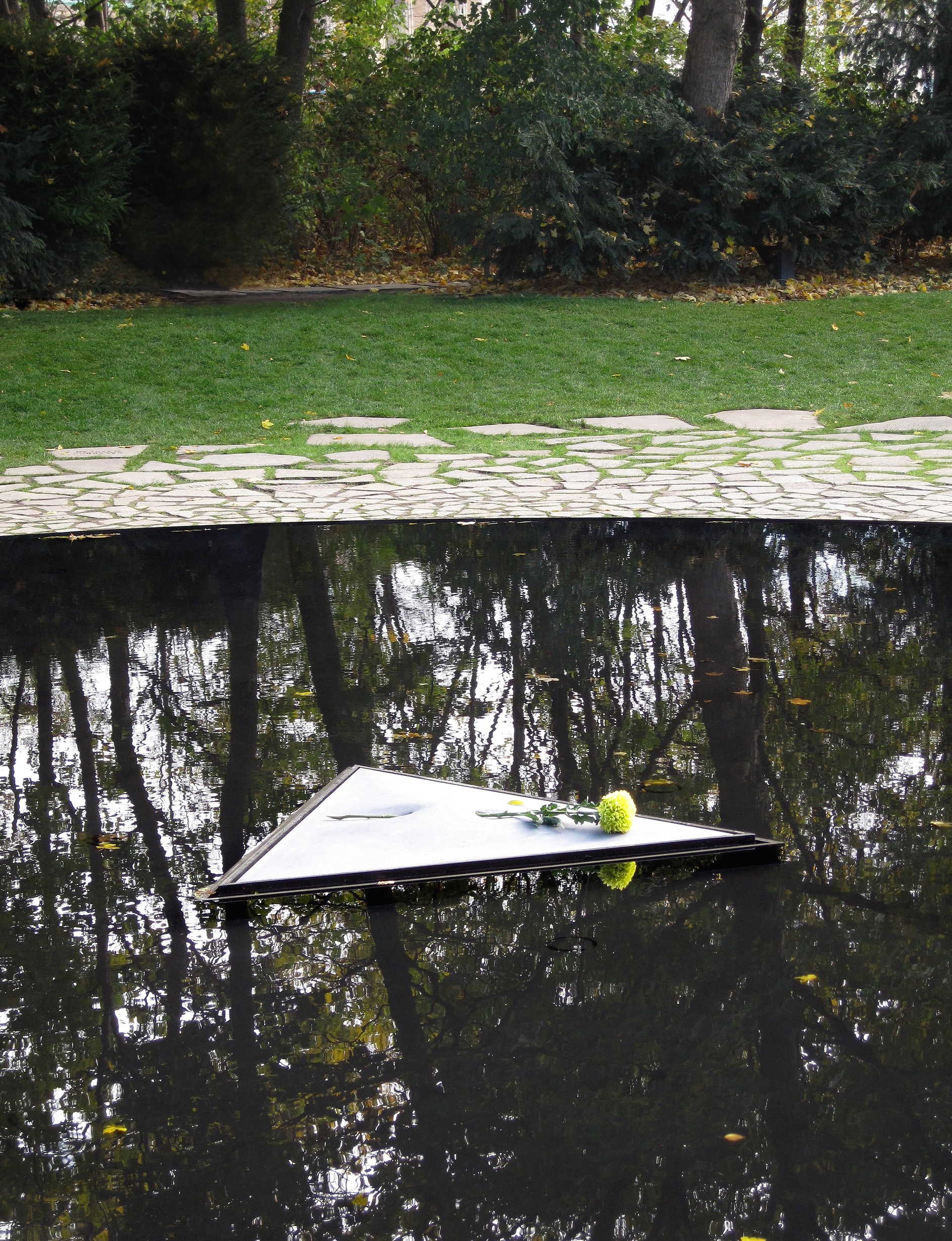
The center of the pool at The Memorial to the Sinti and Roma victims of National Socialism.

== Location and design ==
The memorial is on Simsonweg in the Tiergarten in Berlin, south of the Reichstag and near the Brandenburg Gate.

The memorial was designed by the Israeli artist Dani Karavan and consists of a dark, circular pool of water at the centre of which there is a triangular stone. The triangular shape of the stone is in reference to the badges that had to be worn by concentration camp prisoners. The stone is retractable and a fresh flower is placed upon it daily. In bronze letters around the edge of the pool is the poem 'Auschwitz' (in English, German, Vlax Romani and Sinte Romani) by Roma poet Santino Spinelli, although the monument commemorates all Roma and Sinti murdered during the Porajmos:

Gaunt face
dead eyes
cold lips
quiet
a broken heart
out of breath
without words
no tears

Information boards surround the memorial and provide a chronology of the genocide of the Sinti and Roma.

== History ==
The establishment of a permanent memorial to Sinti and Roma victims of the Nazi regime was a long-standing demand of the Central Council of German Sinti and Roma and the German Sinti Alliance. In 1992 the Federal Government agreed to build a monument but the memorial faced years of delay and disputes over its design and location. The city of Berlin initially wanted to place it in the less prominent district of Marzahn, where hundreds of Roma and Sinti were held in terrible conditions from 1936. In 2001 it was agreed to site it in the Tiergarten close to other Holocaust memorials but work did not officially commence until 19 December 2008, the commemoration day for victims of the Porajmos. The memorial was completed at a cost of 2.8 million euros and unveiled by Angela Merkel on 24 October 2012.
