= Tiergarten (park) =

Berlin's most popular inner-city park

- Großer Tiergarten
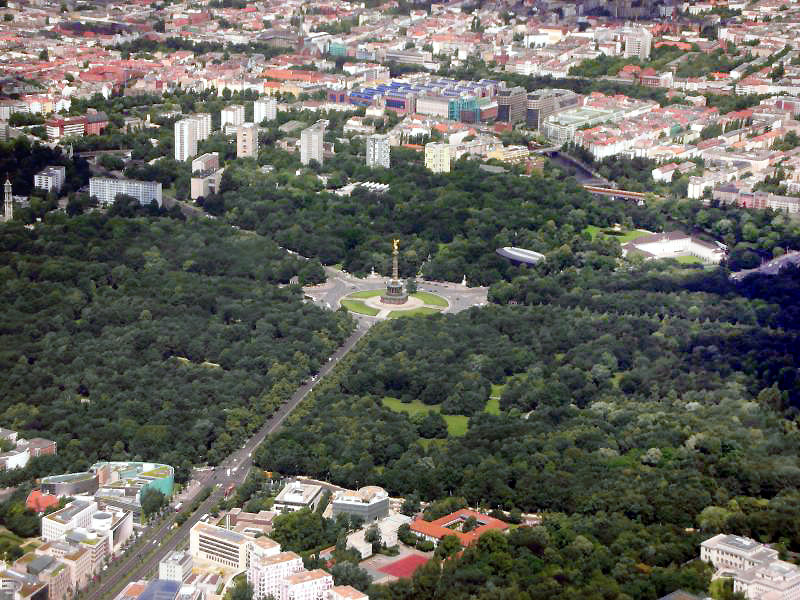
- Großer Tiergarten in the centre, with the narrow long Kleiner Tiergarten at the upper edge
- Type: Urban park
- Location: Berlin, Germany
- Area: 210 hectares (520 acres)
- Water: Landwehr Canal, Neuer See, Tiergartengewässer

The Tiergarten (German: [ˈtiːɐ̯ˌɡaʁtn̩], English: Animal Garden), formal German name: Großer Tiergarten (English: Greater Animal Garden, or deer park, game hunting park), is a prominent park in Berlin's inner-city area, located completely in the district of the same name. It is one of the most popular parks in the city and at 210 hectares (520 acres) in size, is among the largest urban gardens in Germany. Only the Tempelhofer Park (previously Berlin's Tempelhof airport) and Munich's Englischer Garten are larger.

== History ==
=== 16th century ===
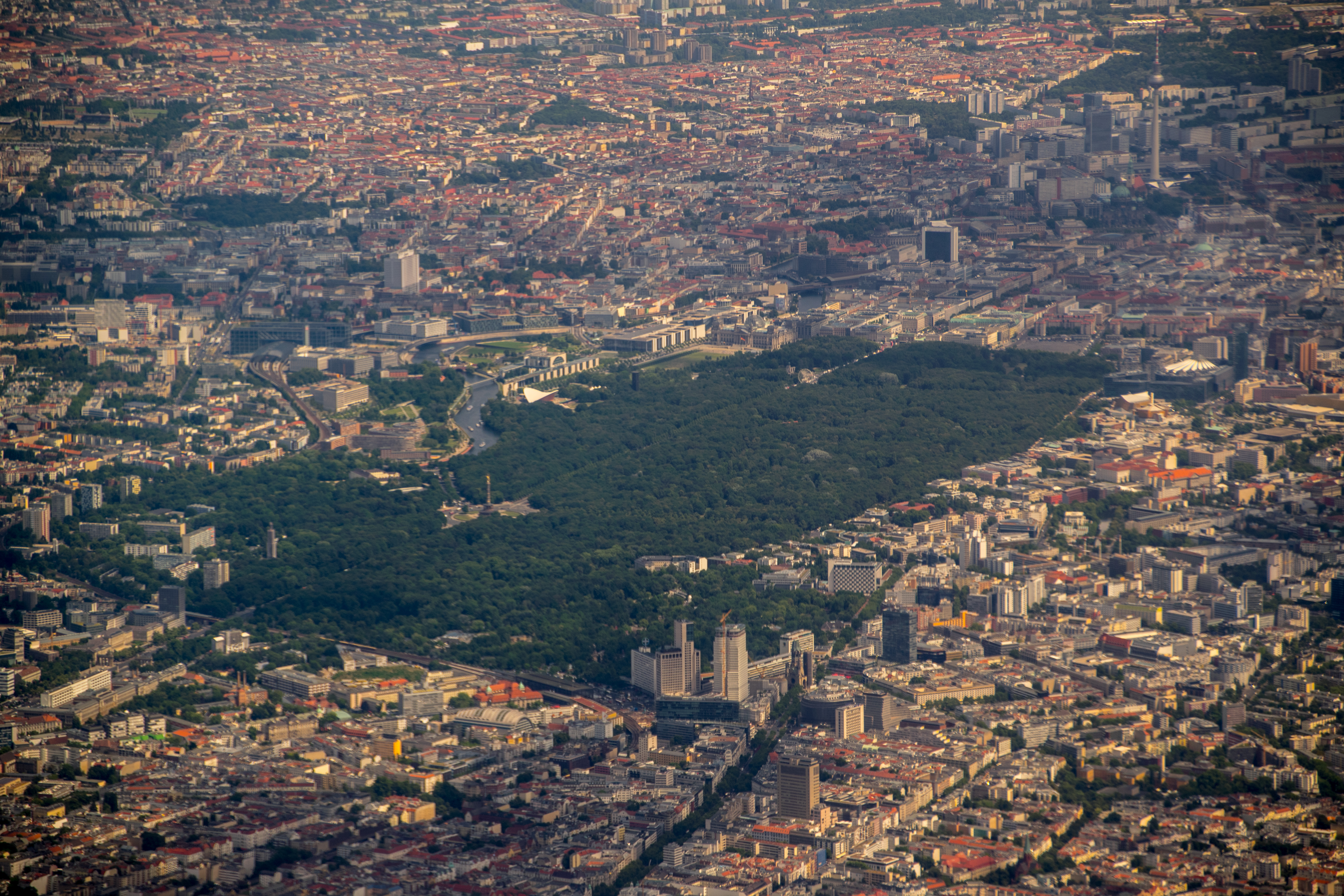
Full aerial view of the Tiergarten

The beginnings of the Tiergarten can be traced back to 1527. It was founded as a hunting area for the Elector of Brandenburg, and was situated to the west of the Cölln city wall, which was the sister town of Old Berlin. It also sat in the same vicinity as the City Palace (Stadtschloss). In 1530 the expansion began; acres of land were purchased and the garden began to expand towards the north and west. The total area extended beyond the current Tiergarten, and the forests were perfect for hunting deer and other wild animals (Tiergarten literally translates as animal garden). The Elector of Brandenburg had wild animals placed within the Tiergarten, which was fenced off from the outside to prevent the creatures from escaping, and was the main hunting ground for the electors of Brandenburg. This hobby, however, began to fade away as the city of Berlin began to expand and the hunting area shrank to accommodate the growth.

=== 17th–18th centuries ===
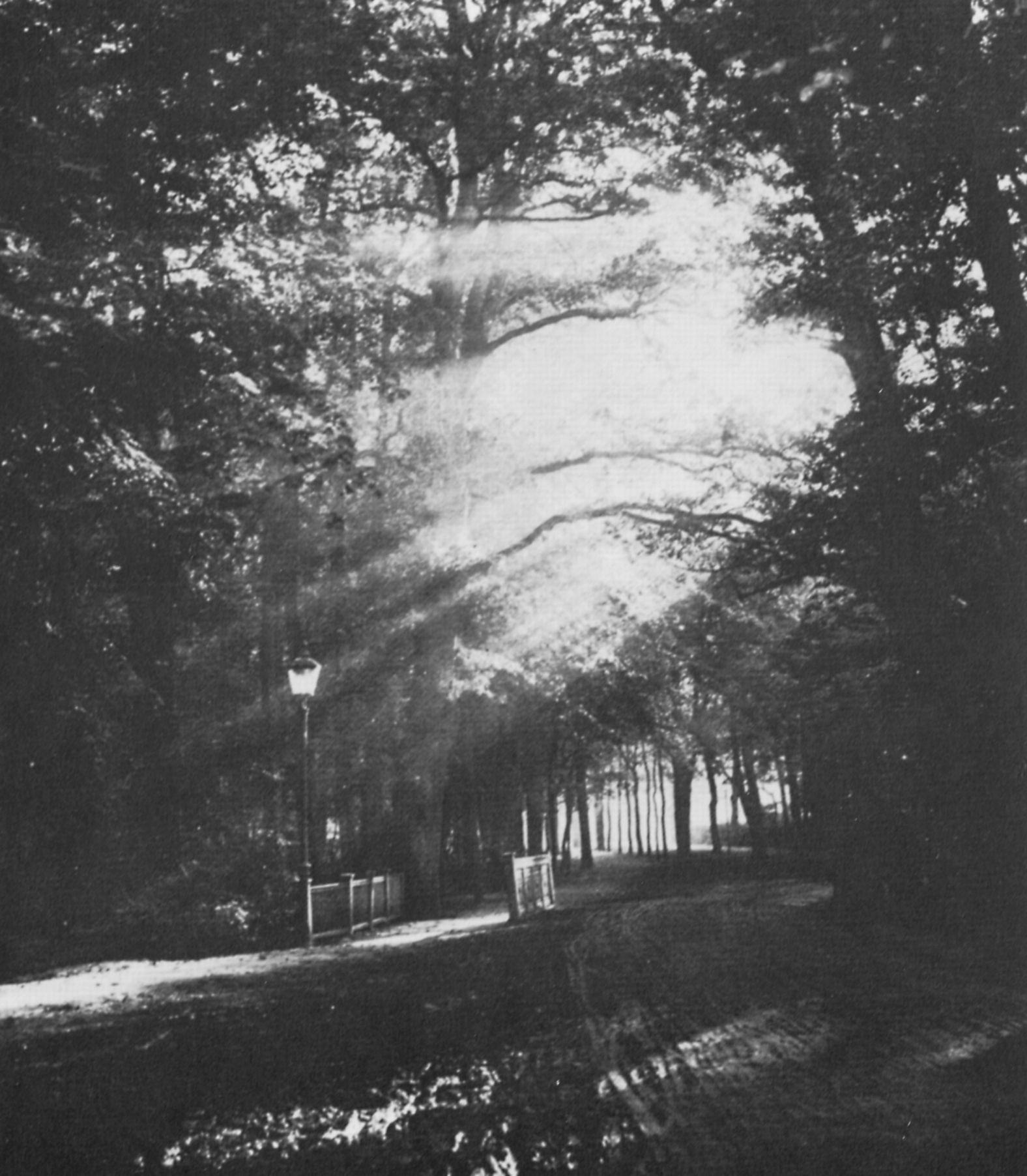
Tiergarten bridge

Frederick Wilhelm I (1688–1740), Elector of Brandenburg (1713–1740), feeling the need to bring change to his private hunting grounds, built many structures that are still visible today. As the King was expanding Unter den Linden, a roadway that connected the City Palace and the Tiergarten, he had a swathe of forest removed in order to connect his castle to the newly built Charlottenburg Palace. Der Große Stern, the central square of the Tiergarten, and Kurfürstenplatz, the electoral plaza, were added, with seven and eight boulevards respectively. This is seen as the beginning of a transformation in the Tiergarten, a movement from the king's personal hunting territory to a forest park designed for the people.

Frederick Wilhelm I's son and successor, Frederick II (Frederick the Great) (1712–1786) did not appreciate the hunt as his predecessors did, In 1740, he opened the park's first public gardens. In 1742 he instructed the architect Georg Wenzeslaus von Knobelsdorff to tear down the fences that surrounded the territory and to turn the park into a Lustgarten (literally "pleasure garden"), one that would be open to the people of Berlin. In the baroque style popular at the time he added flowerbeds, borders and espaliers in geometrical layouts, along with mazes, water basins and ornamental ponds; he also commissioned sculptures to add cultural significance. Unique to the time period, areas of congregation called "salons" were established along the many different walkways in the park. These salons were blocked off from the walking path by hedges or trees and often furnished with seating, fountains and vases, offering guests a change of pace and a place to discuss intellectual matters in private. Such freedom was common under the rule of Frederick II; there were even residents allowed to live within the Tiergarten. Refugees, Huguenots in hiding from the French, were allowed to erect tents and sell refreshments to the pedestrians walking through the park. In 1786, the year of the king's death, his youngest brother Prince Augustus Ferdinand of Prussia moved into Bellevue Palace, which he had built inside the Tiergarten (on the premises of a former mansion on the banks of the Spree river which Knobelsdorff had built for himself in 1743). Furthermore a pheasant house was erected inside the park, which would later become the core of the Zoological Garden, a zoo founded in 1844 that lies within the greater Tiergarten. During the revolutions of 1848, the park hosted the first assembly demanding the abolishment of the national censors.

=== 19th century ===
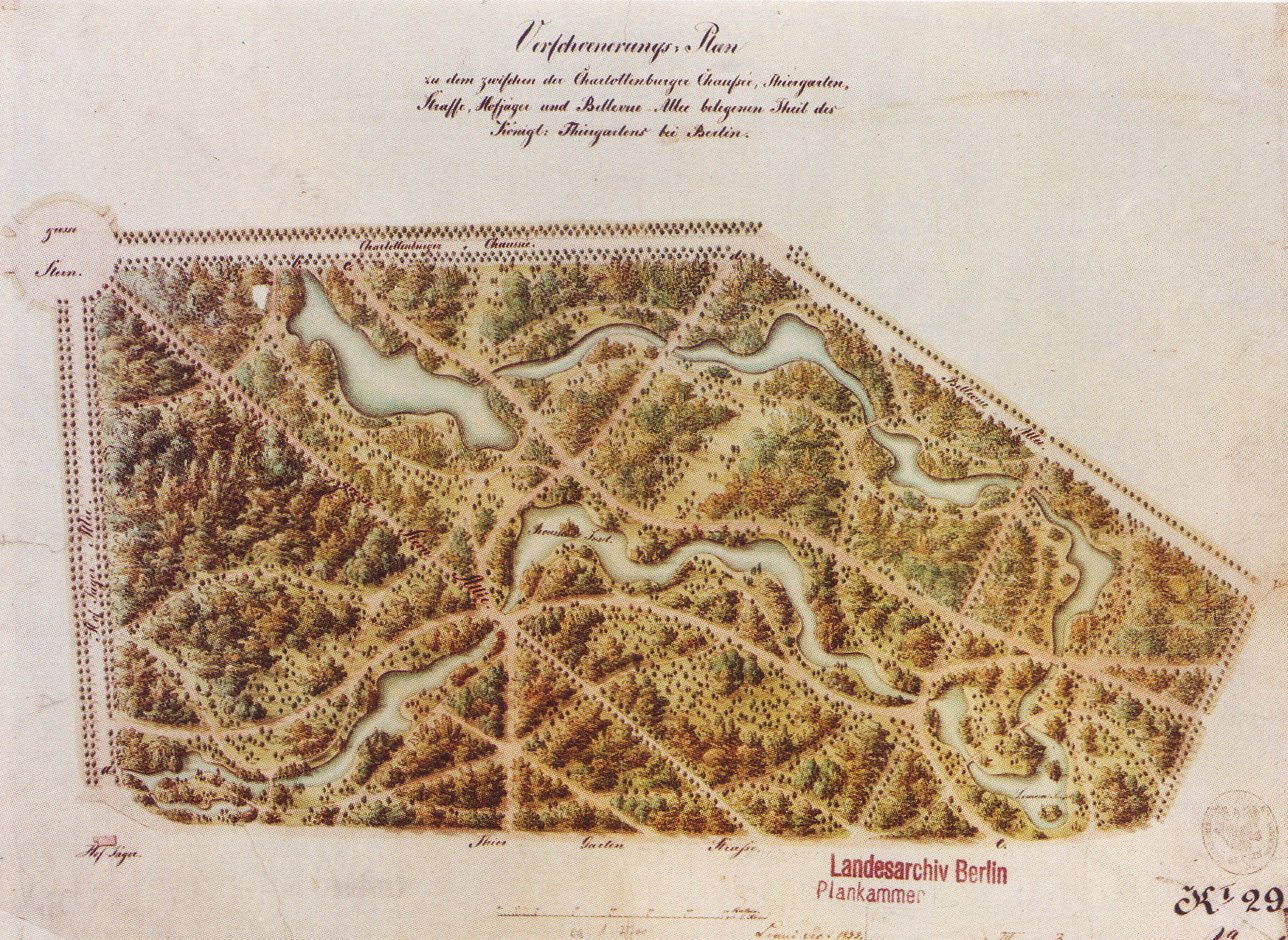
A park map of 1835 drawn by Peter Joseph Lenné

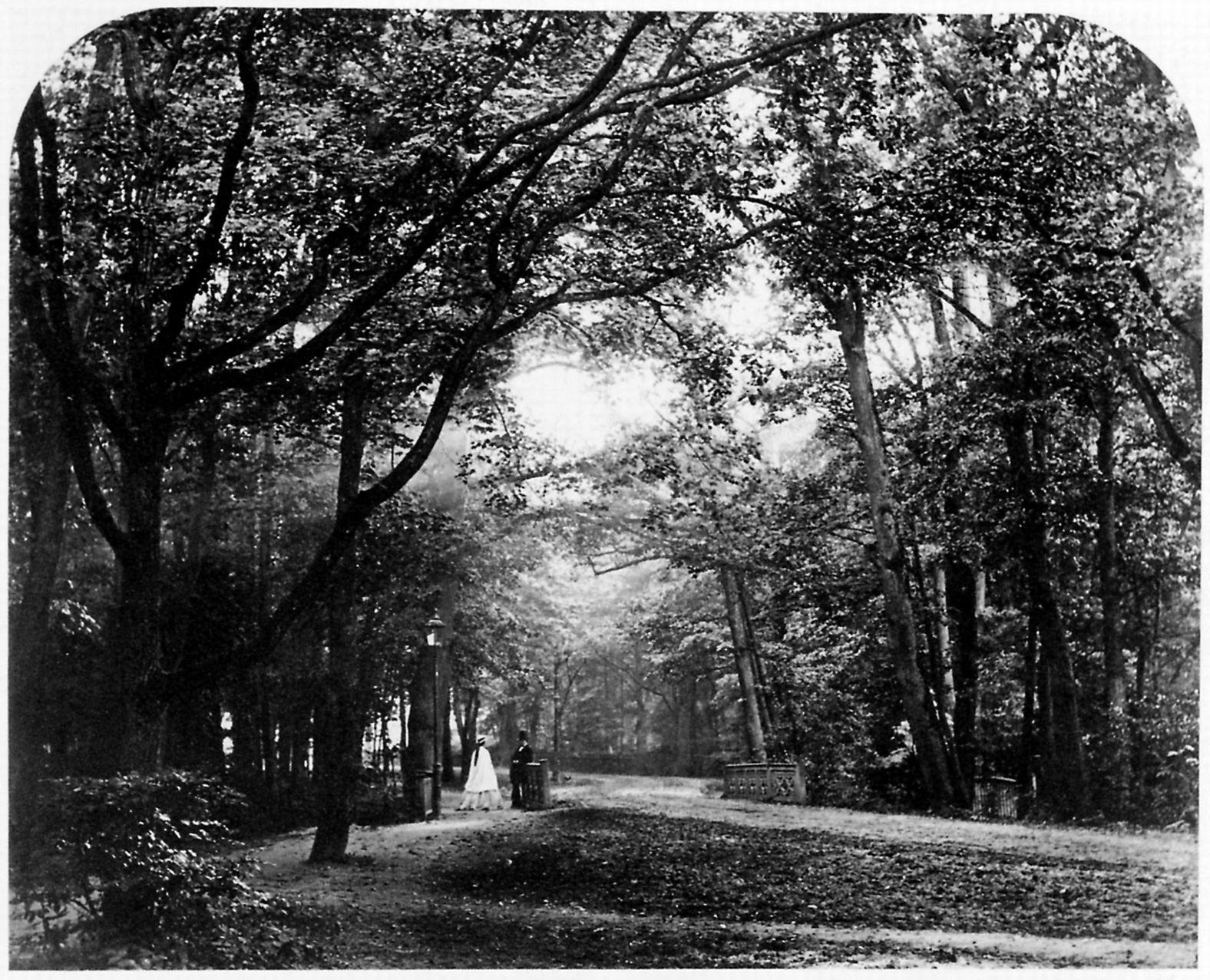
Near side of Tiergarten bridge

At the end of the 18th century, Knobelsdorff's late-baroque form had been all but replaced by ideas for a new, scenic garden ideal. The castle park Bellevue and Rousseau Island were laid out by court gardener Justus Ehrenreich Sello in the late 18th century. It was then in 1818 that the king commissioned the help of Peter Joseph Lenné, a young man who was at the time the gardener's assistant at Sanssouci in Potsdam. His plans involved the creation of a rural Volkspark, or people's park, that would also serve as a sort of Prussian national park that would help lift the spirits of those who visited. However, the King Frederick William III rejected Lenné's plan. Against the opposition of a hesitant bureaucracy, Lenné submitted a modified version of his concept. This plan was accepted and realized between 1833 and 1840. The park was modeled after English gardens, but Lenné made sure to pay attention to Knobelsdorff's structures and layouts. By draining forests areas he allowed for more footpaths, roadways, and bridleways to be laid down. Several features became characteristic components of the Tiergarten. Wide-open grass lawns traversed by streams and clusters of trees, lakes with small islands, countless bridges like the Löwenbrücke, and a multitude of pathways became distinguishing features of the new garden.

Up until 1881, the Tiergarten was owned by the monarchy, and came under the direct control of the King and later the Emperor. Soon after Emperor William I abolished his rights to the forest, he added the boundaries to the new district of Berlin, so that the people may use and uphold it. However, until the middle of the twentieth century, the Tiergarten remained in the style that Lenné had left it in. The biggest changes came in the form of nationalistic memorials that began construction in 1849 under the directorship of Eduard Niede and Hermann Geitner. These monuments were seen as patriotic contributions to the culture of the Tiergarten. The Siegesallee ("Victory Avenue") could be considered the most famous addition. Built under the orders of Emperor William II, it was lined with statues of former Prussian royal figures of varying historical importance. The Prachtboulevard ("Magnificence Boulevard") was added in 1895 and became the area known as the Königsplatz, which would later become Platz der Republik.

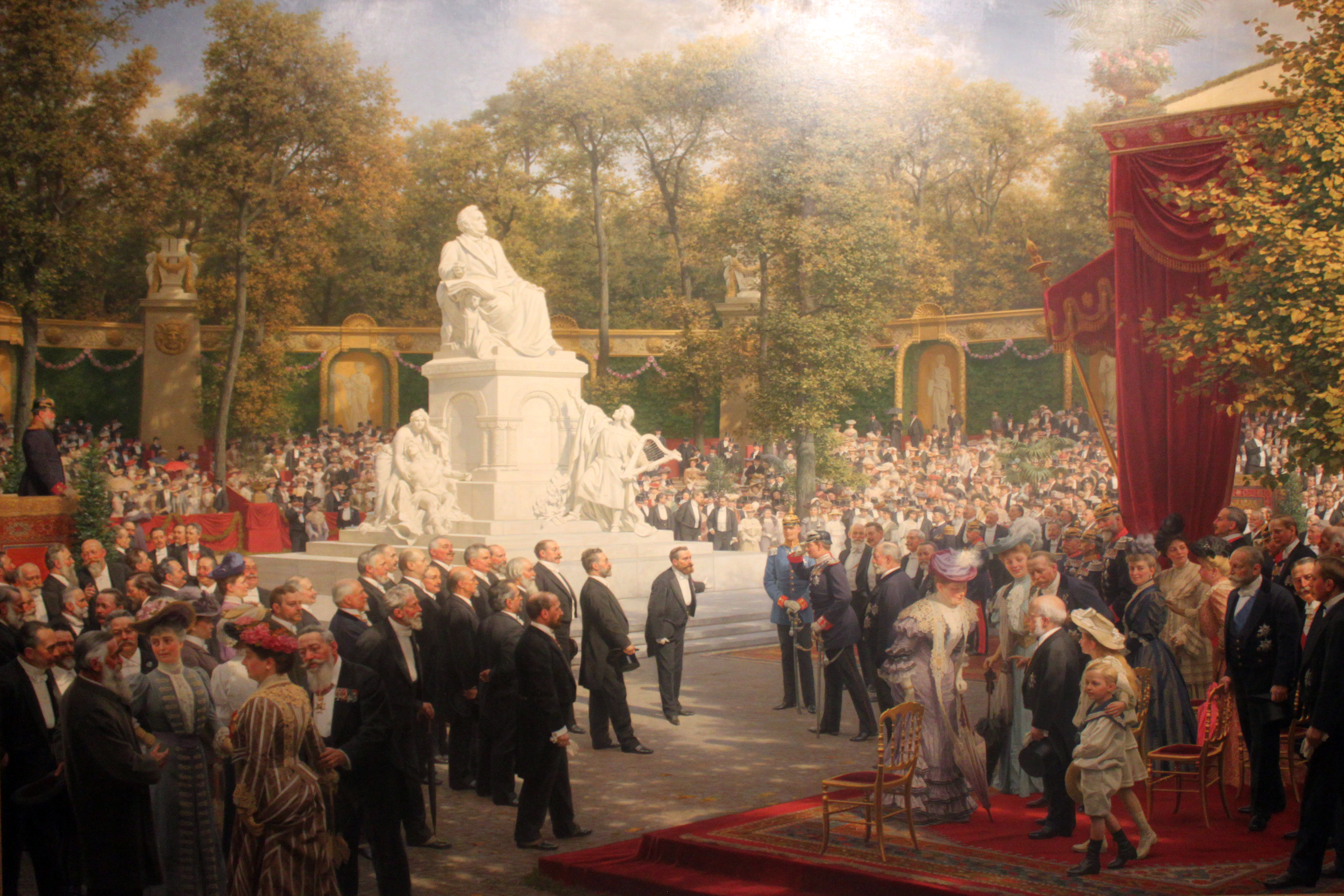
Unveiling of the Richard Wagner Monument in the Tiergarten (1908), by Anton von Werner

The park is covered in statues commemorating those famous to the Prussians and the activities they enjoyed doing. Animal statues are to be found throughout the park, playing the counterpart to the stone hunters that also inhabit the area. Built by famous sculptor Friedrich Drake, a statue to Queen Louise, beloved queen of the Prussians, is also to be found here alongside her husband, Frederick William III. Statues of Johann Wolfgang von Goethe, Gotthold Ephraim Lessing, Theodor Fontane, Richard Wagner and Albert Lortzing were also erected. The Komponistendenkmal, or the Beethoven-Haydn-Mozart Memorial, is another example of how the Germans wanted to respect and honor the men and women who gave them a unique culture.

=== 20th century ===
==== Under Nazi control ====
After the Nazi Party took control of Germany in 1933, Adolf Hitler had planned the complete renovation of the city of Berlin. "Welthauptstadt Germania", or World Capital Germania, was the idea the Nazis wanted to bring to fruition. The Tiergarten was to be a central location in the new city. The Charlottenburger Chaussee, today known as the Straße des 17. Juni, was to be the central line between the east and west, and was widened from 27 metres (89 ft) to 53 metres (174 ft), the same width as the current street. The Berlin Victory Column was also moved to the Großer Stern, where it remains to this day.

The Second World War caused significant damage to the Tiergarten and its various cultural elements. Many statues were destroyed or damaged. Some of the Berlin citizens even buried statues in the grounds of the nearby Bellevue Palace in order to prevent further destruction. They were not recovered until 1993.

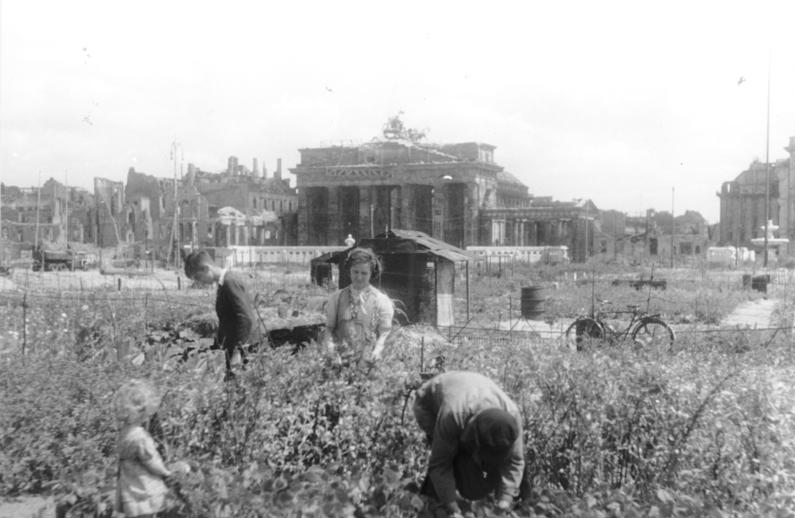
Tiergarten being used as farmland. In the background, the ruins of the city and the Brandenburg Gate are visible (1947).

After the war, the Tiergarten became part of the British Occupation sector of West Berlin. The area however underwent a sudden, violent change; much of the wooded area was felled and turned to firewood due to the shortage of coal, and the now empty fields were turned into temporary farmland by order of British troops. There were around 2,550 plots of land available for growing potatoes and vegetables. However, these two factors caused the once great forest to nearly disappear; only 700 trees survived out of over 200,000 that once lined the parkway, the bodies of water turned silty, every bridge was destroyed, the monuments lay on their sides and were badly damaged. Plans to fill the waterways with debris from the war were also suggested, but were prevented by the head of the Berlin Central Office of Environmental Planning, Reinhold Lingner.

In 1945, almost directly after the fall of Berlin, the occupying Soviets erected a Soviet War Memorial (Tiergarten) for the fallen soldiers of the Red Army on the north side of the current Straße des 17. Juni. Situated less than a mile away from the Reichstag, it was built at such short notice that it was located in the planned British sector. When the Berlin Wall went up around West Berlin in 1961, the monument became inaccessible to the people for whom it was built, although Soviet honour guards were allowed to be stationed at the monument, with approval from the British occupying forces.

==== Post restoration ====
On 2 June 1945, the Berlin Magistrate decided they would restore the Greater Tiergarten. The first suggestions came in 1946/47. Reinhold Lingner and Georg Pniower, Professor of Garden Design at Berlin University, were the first to offer plans, but both were rejected during the division of Berlin by the Allied powers. Instead, they decided to follow the plans of the Tiergarten Director Willy Alverdes, whose plan seemed to be a more pragmatic approach: instead of rebuilding the park in a new fashion, Alverdes' plans depended on the existing design of the park. He wanted to establish a tranquil, spacious park where one could relax and recover. The Tiergarten was re-forested between 1949 and 1959. On 17 March 1949, the Lord Mayor Ernst Reuter planted the first tree, a linden, to signify the beginning of the restoration. West Germany took over the operation and sponsorship with about 250,000 young trees being delivered to the former capital from all over the Bundesrepublik, even being delivered via plane during the Berlin Blockade. Alverdes's plan did away with the pre-existing baroque-styled structures in the park, claiming the style was not in keeping with the period. The combination of baroque and regional art was tossed out. Being a very natural park landscape, the Tiergarten was a very important large green space for rest and relaxation for the West Berliners, who were separated from the surrounding East German countryside by the Berlin Wall.

Several buildings have been added to the area surrounding the park, many of which were constructed by foreign architects. The Haus der Kulturen der Welt is a prime example. It began construction in 1956 under the initiative of Eleanor Dulles as an American contribution to the Interbau, an International Architecture Exhibition employed to exhibit new social, cultural, and ecological ideas in architecture.

==== Post-re-unification ====
The Tiergarten's culture began to stagnate until the fall of the Berlin Wall in 1990. After the reunification of East and West Berlin in 1990, many of the outskirts of the park changed drastically. For instance, along the streets that border the southern boundary of the park, dilapidated embassy buildings that had stood for decades were reoccupied and others were rebuilt from the ground up, such as the Nordic embassies. On the northern border the new German Chancellery was built, along with office buildings for the everyday work of the delegates. The Reichstag was refurbished with a new, glass dome that has become a popular tourist attraction. Several overgrown areas that had been used for picnics and football were replaced with open spaces and grassy lawns that have added to the prestige of the park. Due to its status as a garden memorial of the city of Berlin, encroachment onto the Tiergarten from businesses and residents has been illegal since 1991.

The Tiergartentunnel, commissioned in 2006, has been built under the Tiergarten, allowing easy movement from north to south for motor vehicles, trams, and more recently S-Bahn trains. The original proposal for the tunnel was met with great opposition from environmentalists, who believed the vegetation would be damaged due to shifts in ground-water levels; in fact, the first plans for construction were denied by a court order.

Two memorial monuments are located towards the eastern end of the park—the Memorial to Homosexuals Persecuted Under Nazism, built 2008, and the Memorial to the Sinti and Roma Victims of National Socialism, built 2012.

On 25 July 2026, the Berlin Pride van attack took place in the park.

== Facilities and attractions ==
- The Berlin zoo
- Monuments (Soviet War Memorial)
- Gaslaternen-Freilichtmuseum Berlin - a permanent exhibition of historical gas lanterns
- spaces suitable for picnics, barbecues, jogging, cycling, and field sports such as soccer
- pedal-taxi rentals
- a large playground on the park's southeastern corner, near Potsdamer Platz.
- During cold winters, it is occasionally possible to go ice-skating on some of the park's small ponds.
- English gardens

== Geography ==
The park is located on the northern and central side of Tiergarten locality and is bordered, on the northern side, by the river Spree. The little quarter Hansaviertel borders on it at the north-western side and the Zoological Garden is situated on the south-western side. The principal road is the Straße des 17. Juni, which ends at the Brandenburg Gate to the east. Other main roads are the Altonaer Straße, Spreeweg and Helmut-Kohl-Allee. In the middle of the park is the square named Großer Stern ("Great Star") with the Siegessäule (Victory column) located in its centre. In addition to the Brandenburg Gate, other notable buildings and structures located close to the park are the Soviet War Memorial, the Reichstag (seat of the Bundestag) and Federal Chancellery (seat of the Chancellor of Germany) (all in the eastern borders), the new central railway station (in the north) and, on the southeastern borders, the Memorial to the Murdered Jews of Europe, the Memorial to the Sinti and Roma victims of National Socialism and the central square of Potsdamer Platz.

In the northerly neighbouring quarter of Moabit a much smaller park bears the same name, thus both are differentiated as Großer and Kleiner Tiergarten.

The Tiergarten has an area of around 210 hectares (520 acres), and after Tempelhofer Freiheit, it is the second biggest parkland in Berlin and the third biggest inner-city parkland in Germany.

Close to Helmut-Kohl-Allee, near the Victory Column, there is a nudist area known as Tuntenwiese (Tunten lawn). It is mainly popular among gay men, some of whom use the area for cruising for sex.

== Transport ==
The park is principally served by the S-Bahn at the rail stops of Berlin Tiergarten (situated at the western entrance on the Straße des 17. Juni) and Berlin Bellevue (lines S3 S5 S7 S9). The N9 bus also serves the park.

== In Art and Culture ==
- Robert Walser wrote a prose piece about the Tiergarten, which is included in the 2012 English-language collection Berlin Stories.

== Gallery ==
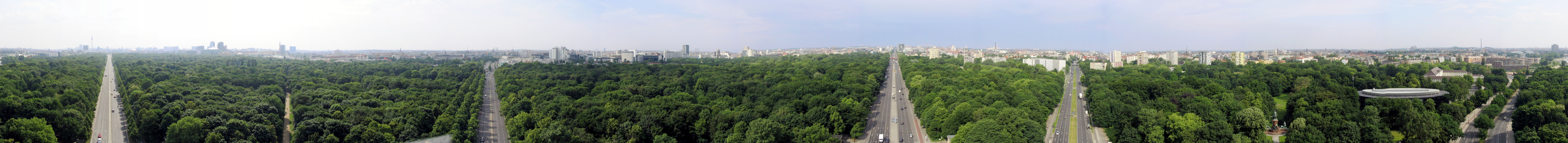
Panorama of the park from the top of the Siegessäule: Straße des 17. Juni (east), Helmut-Kohl-Allee, Straße des 17. Juni (west), Altonaer Straße, Spreeweg
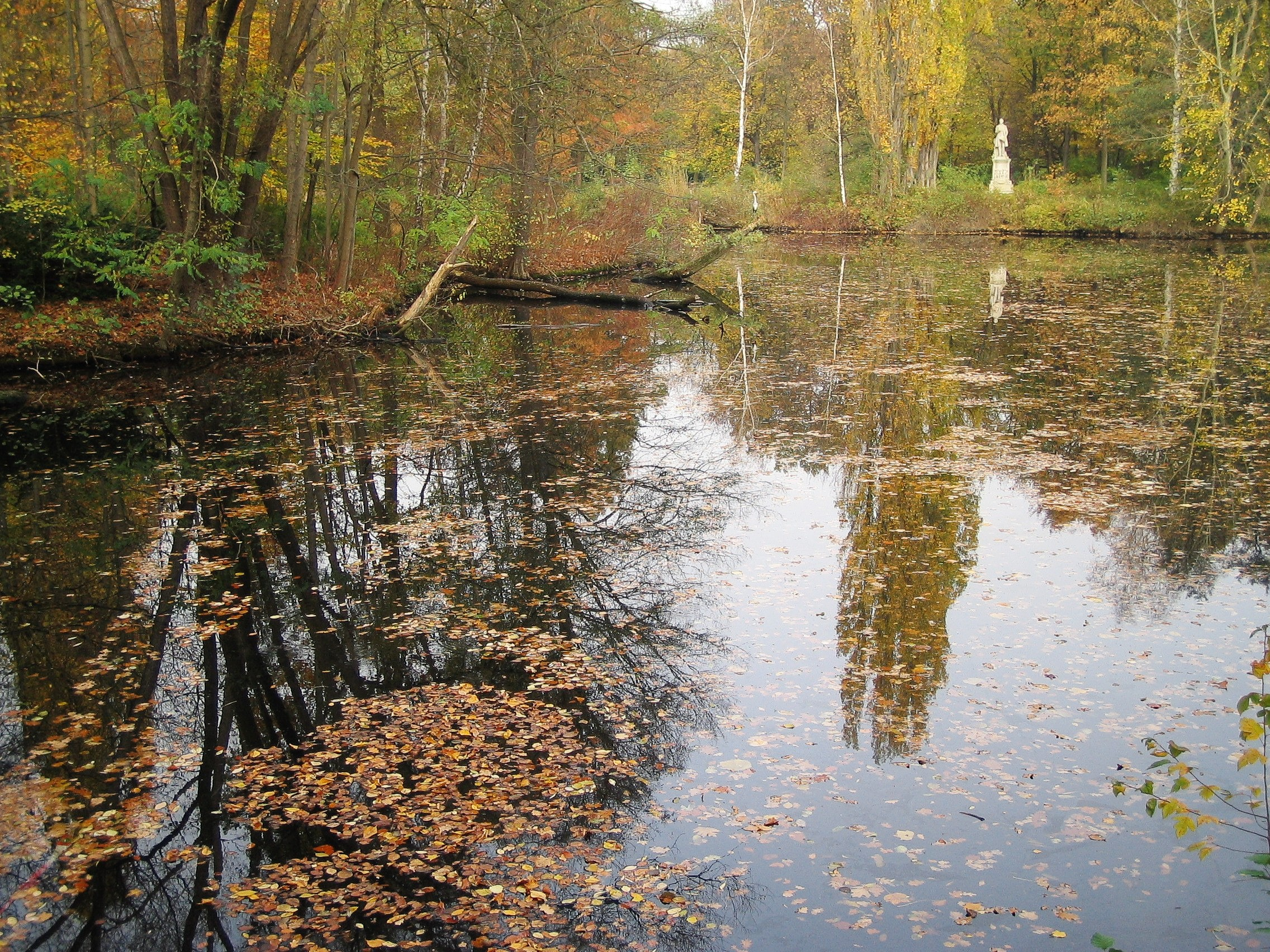
The "Neue Partei" pond

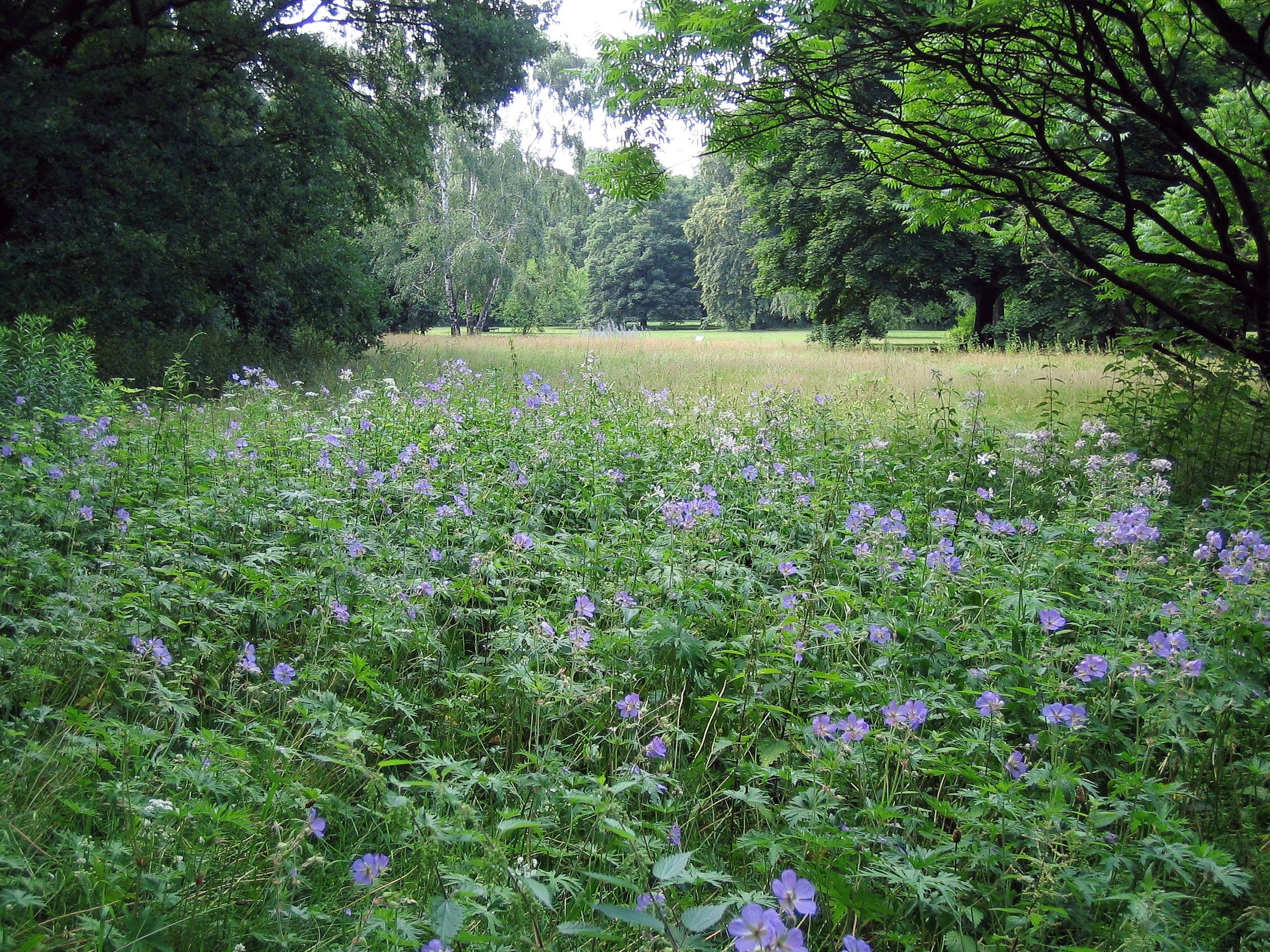
Natural environment

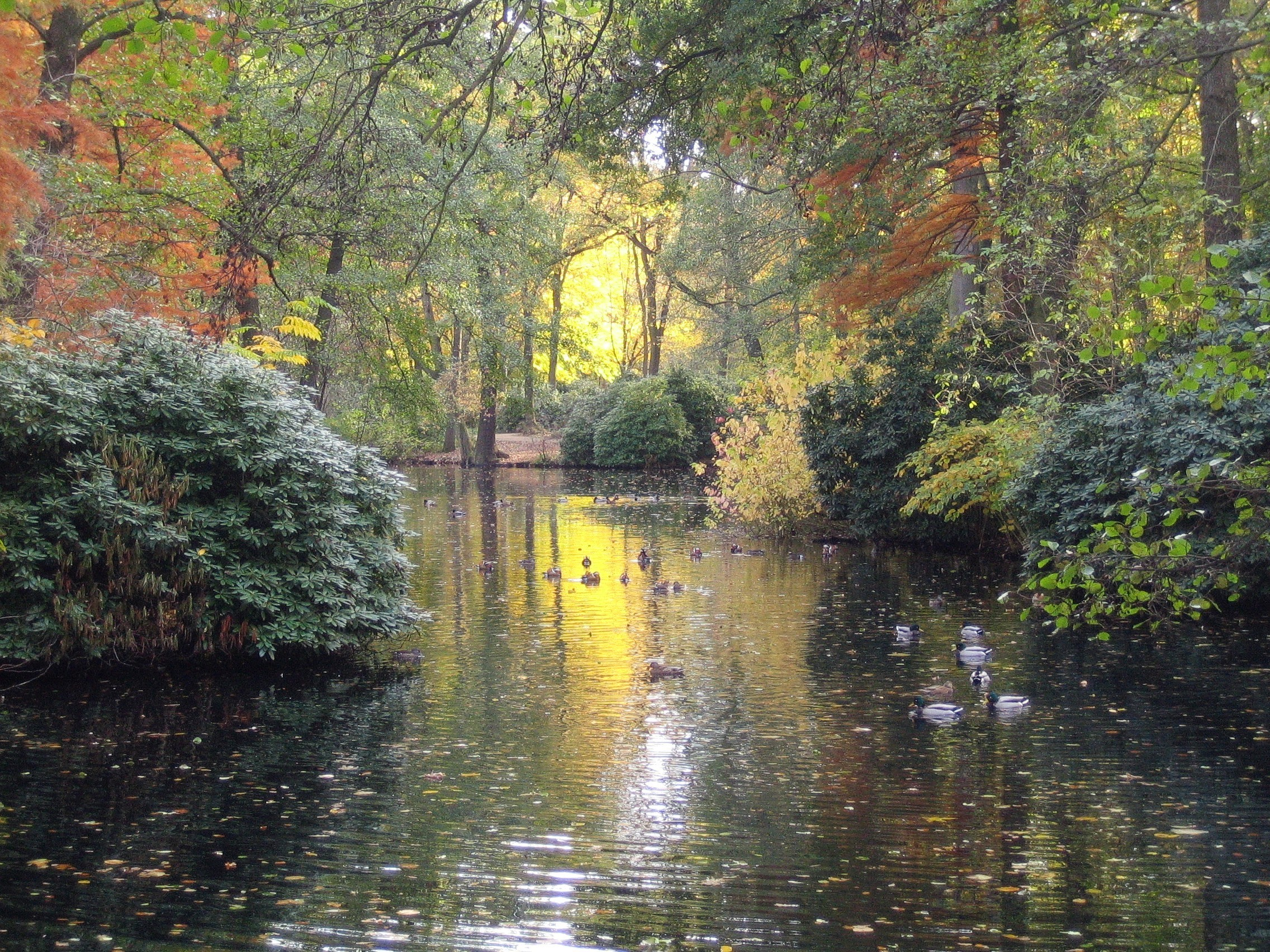
Tiergarten-Gracht

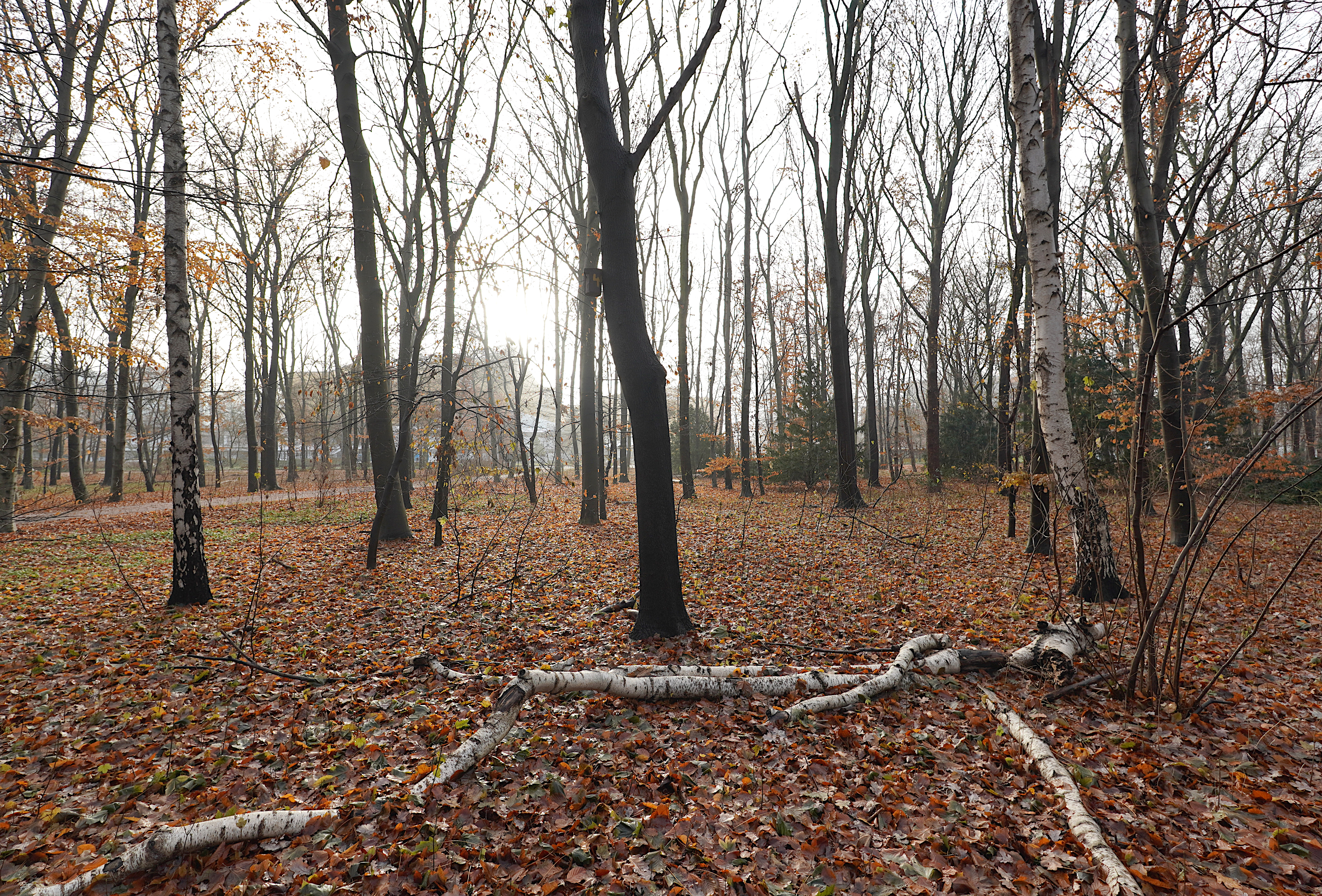
Winter view from Ahornsteig track

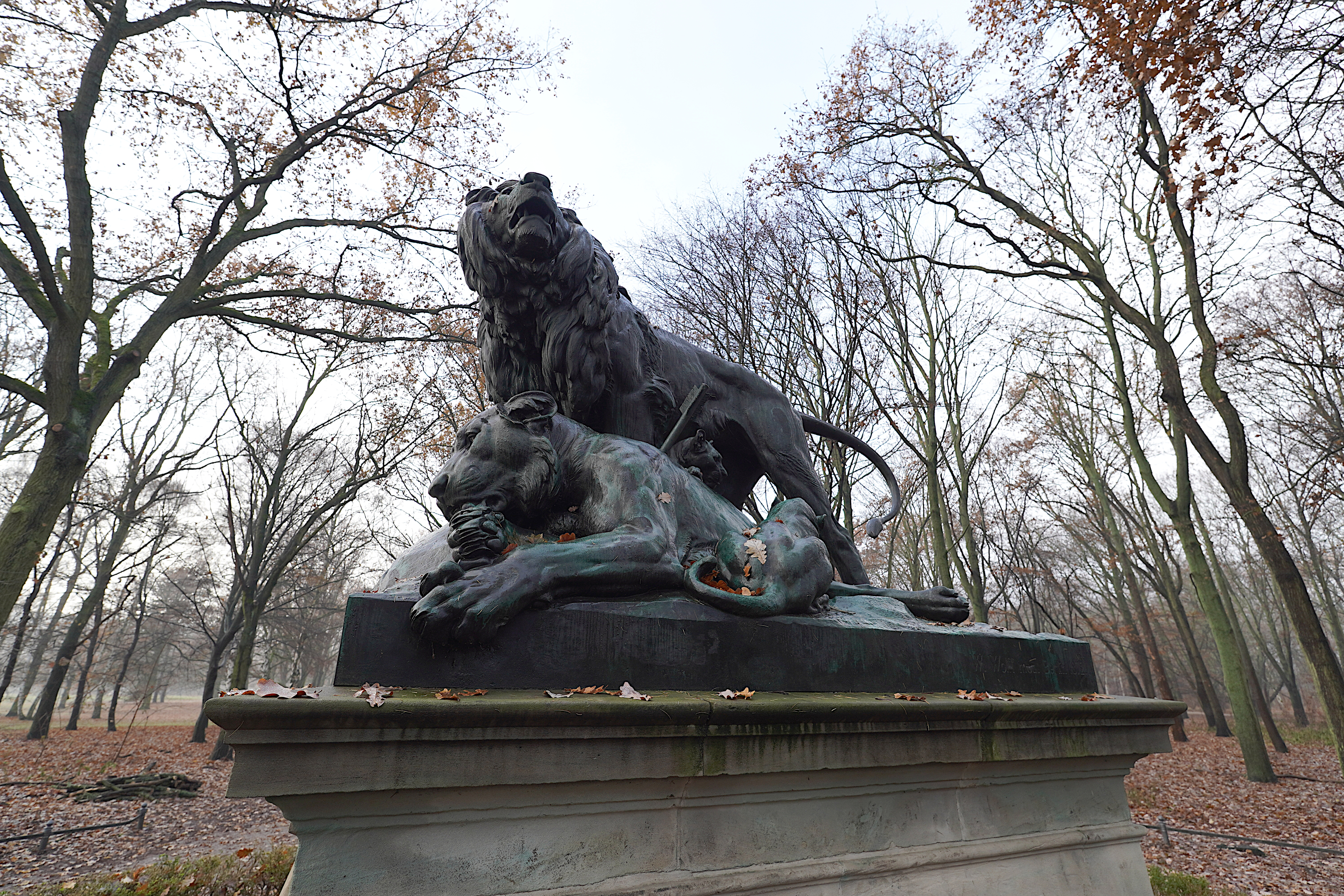
Group of lions sculpture

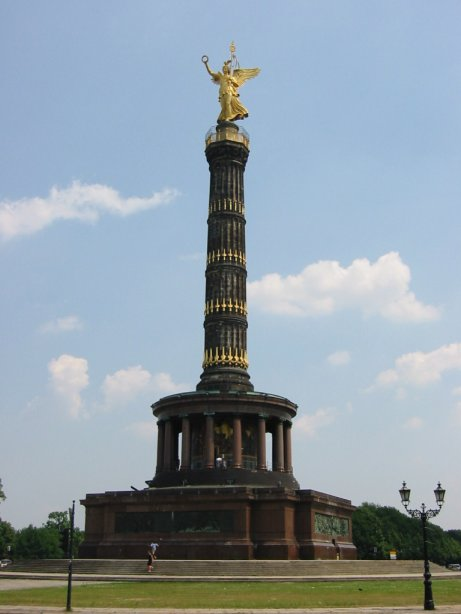
The Victory Column

== See also ==
- Carillon in Berlin-Tiergarten
- Fasanerieallee
- Tiergartenstraße
- List of tourist attractions in Berlin
