= Santa Maria Maggiore, Lanciano =

Church building in Lanciano, Italy

Coordinates: 42°13′50″N 14°23′16″E

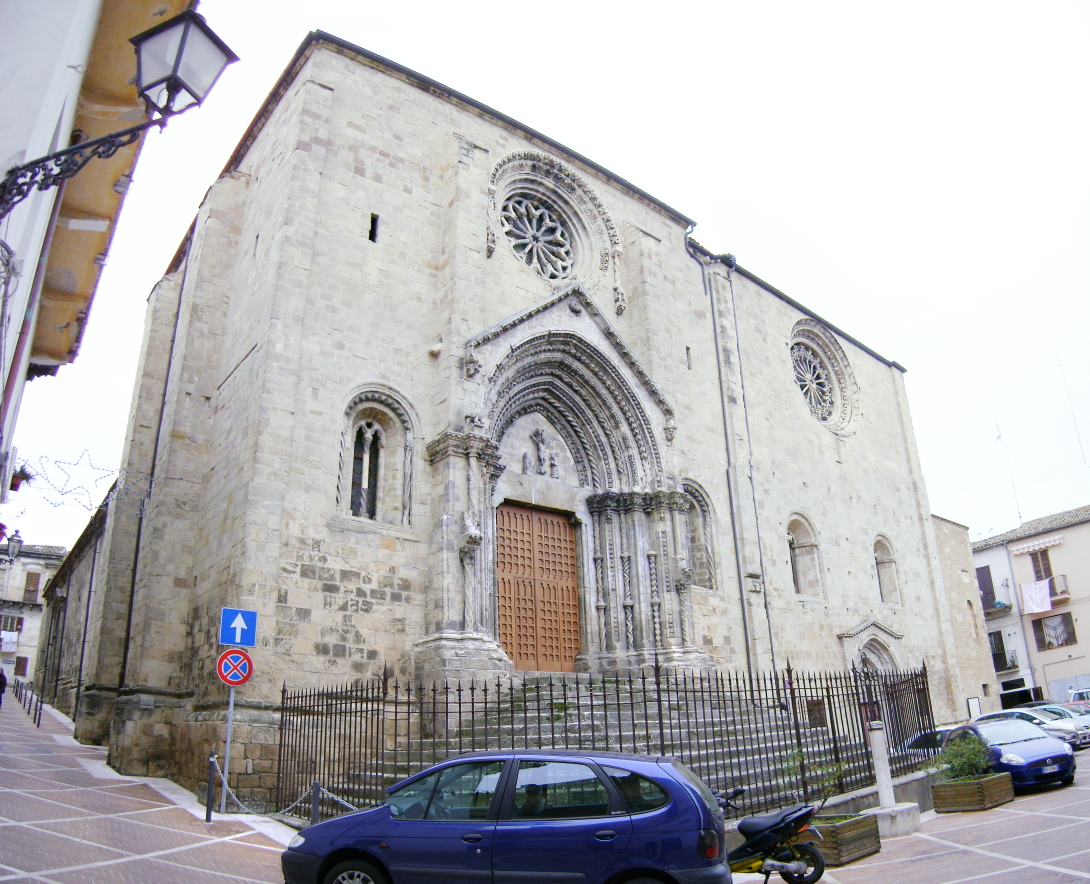
Facade of Santa Maria Maggiore

San Maria Maggiore is a Gothic-style, Roman Catholic parish church located on via San Maria Maggiore in the historic district of Civitanova of Lanciano, region of Abruzzi, Italy.

== History and description ==
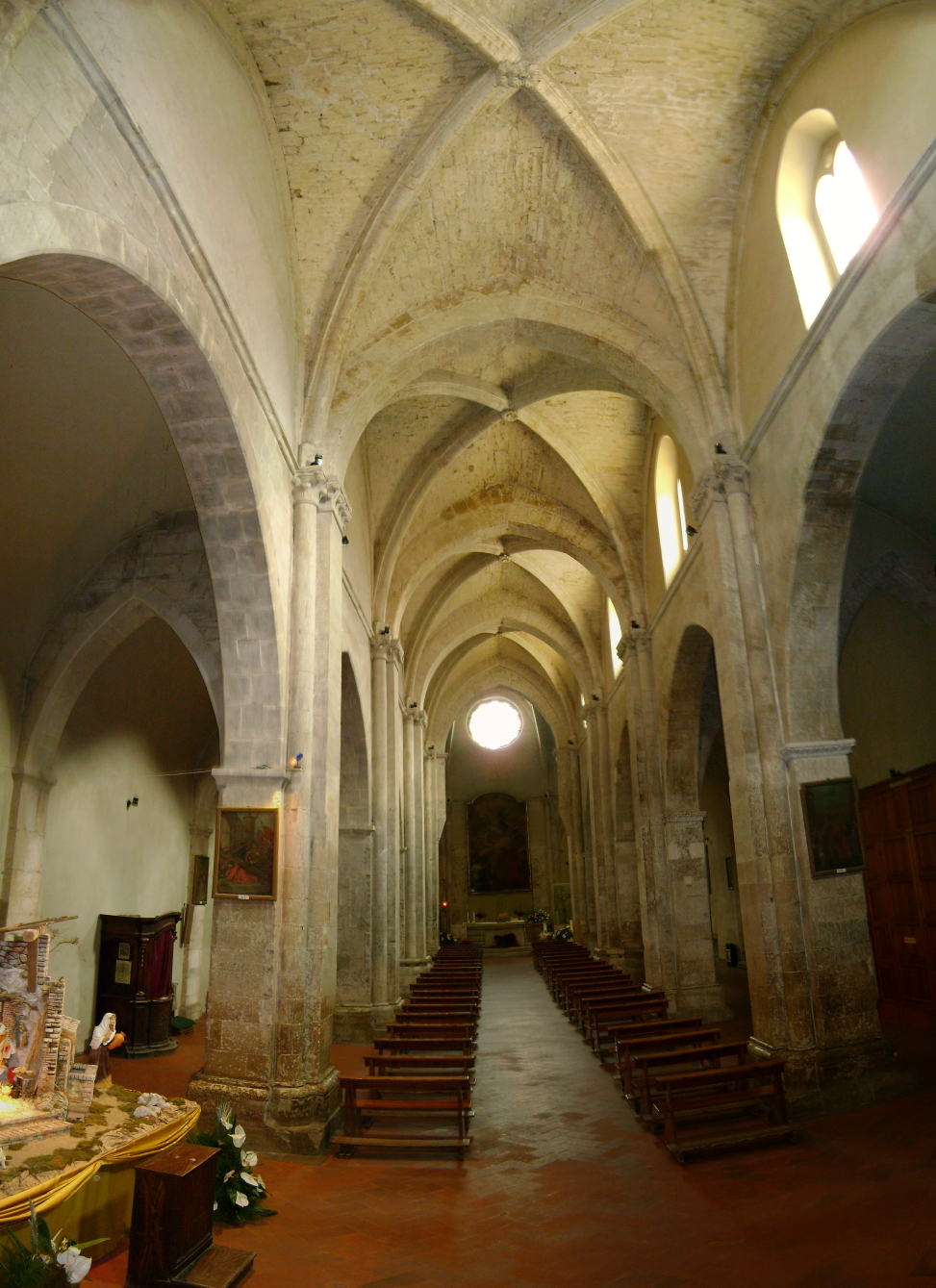
Interior of central nave with ribbed ceiling

Construction was in place by 1227, commissioned by the emperor Frederick II, putatively erected atop a former temple of Apollo built inside a forest sacred to the ancient inhabitants of the region. Excavations in the area found the remains of a previous 12th-century church. In the 13th century, the church was attached to a Benedictine convent. A refurbishment in 1317, inscribed in the portal, led to the gothic facade we see today with rose window, mullioned windows, and an ogival portal. The entrance portal is accessed from a broad set of stairs. The design has been attributed to the local master craftsman Francesco Petrini.

In the tympanum above the entrance portal are three sculpted figures forming a crucifixion scene. Flanking the portal and columns with spiraling ribbons.

In the 16th century, an additional facade with similar windows and a smaller portal was added on the south. By the mid-19th century the church was in a dilapidated state, underwent a reconstruction in the following decades. The bello tower was built with gothic elements.

In 1402, the church was endowed with a gilded silver processional crucifix, attributed to Nicolandrea da Guardagrele. It reportedly was stolen in 1817 but presumably recovered.
