= Pagliarone =

- Frazione
- Location in Italy
- Coordinates: 41°44′20″N 14°14′06″E
- Country: Italy
- Region: Abruzzo
- Province: Chieti
- Time zone: UTC+1 (CET)
  - Summer (DST): UTC+2 (CEST)

Pagliarone is a frazione in the Province of Chieti in the Abruzzo region of Italy.
