= Sant'Onofrio, Lanciano =

Sant'Onofrio
- Frazione
- Interactive map of Sant'Onofrio
- Coordinates: 42°09′40″N 14°24′57″E
- Country: Italy
- Region: Abruzzo
- Province: Chieti
- Commune: Lanciano
- Time zone: UTC+1 (CET)
  - Summer (DST): UTC+2 (CEST)

Sant'Onofrio is a frazione (borough) in the municipality of Lanciano, Province of Chieti, in the Abruzzo region of Italy.
