= Paglieta =

- Comune
- Comune di Paglieta
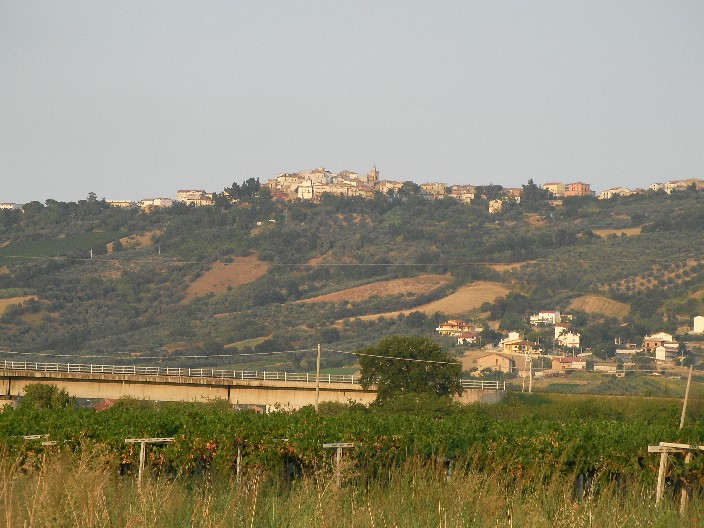
- View of Paglieta

- Location within Italy Location within Abruzzo
- Coordinates: 42°10′N 14°30′E
- Country: Italy
- Region: Abruzzo
- Province: Chieti (CH)
- Frazioni: Collemici, Molina, Piana del Mulino, Pedicagne di Colle Martino, Colle Martino, Piano la Barca, Prato, Ranco, Sant'Egidio, Torre.

Area
  - Total: 34.18 km^{2} (13.20 sq mi)
- Elevation: 235 m (771 ft)

Population (2008)
  - Total: 4,545
  - Density: 133.0/km^{2} (344.4/sq mi)
- Demonym: Paglietani
- Time zone: UTC+1 (CET)
  - Summer (DST): UTC+2 (CEST)
- Postal code: 66020
- Dialing code: 0872
- ISTAT code: 069059
- Patron saint: San Giusto
- Saint day: 14 July
- Website: Official website

Paglieta (Abruzzese: Pajéte) is a comune (municipality) and town in the Province of Chieti in the Abruzzo region of Italy.
