= Fasanerieallee =

Street in Berlin, Germany

Coordinates: 52.5124°N 13.3476°E

- Interactive map of Fasanerieallee
- Part of: Tiergarten
- Type: Allée
- Location: Berlin, Germany
- From: Großer Stern

Other
- Known for: Sculptures from the Wilhelmine period

Fasanerieallee is an allée in Tiergarten in Berlin, Germany. It is primarily known for the many sculptures from the Wilhelmine period. Fasanerieallee is connected to Großer Stern.

== Sculpture ==
Name	Bildhauer	Bild
Eberjagd um 1500	Karl Begas	
Churfürstliche Fuchsjagd	Wilhelm Haverkamp	
Hasenhatz zur Rokokozeit	Max Baumbach	
Altgermanische Wisentjagd	Fritz Schaper	
