= Tucholka =

Tucholka may apply to:

- Tucholka (coat of arms), Pomeranian coat of arms
- Jaro von Tucholka (1894–1978), German photographer
- Tuchółka, village in Poland
- Tukholka, village in Ukraine
