= Kuzniecky =

Kuzniecky, Kuzniecka, Kuzniacki, etc. are surnames of Slavic origin.

- Jürgen Kuzniacki (born 1959), German footballer
- Daniel Kuzniecka, Argentine screenwriter, producer and actor
- Ruben Kuzniecky, Panamanian-American neurologist
