= Jürgen Kuzniacki =

German footballer (born 1959)

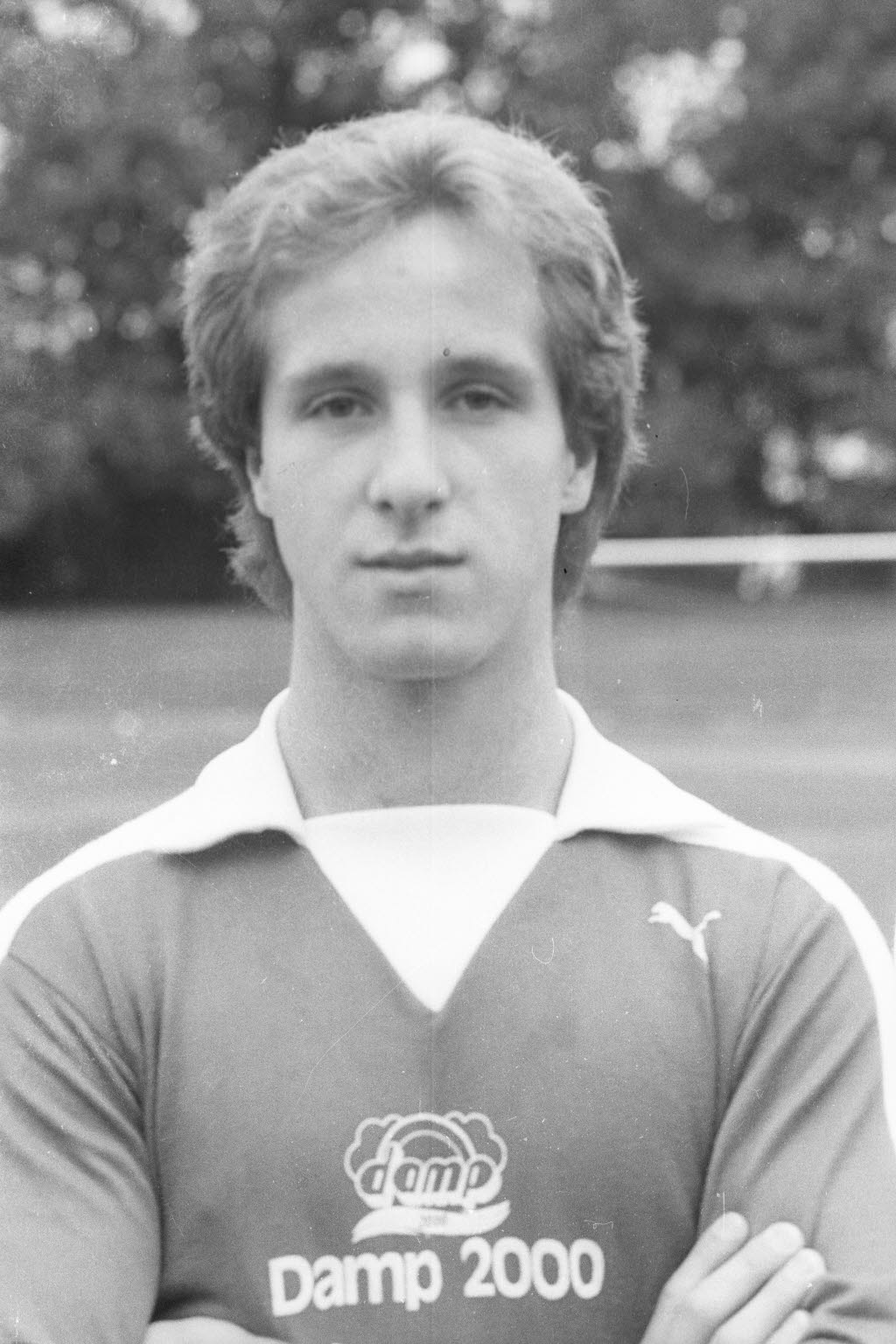
- Kuzniacki in 1978

Personal information
- Full name: Jürgen Kuzniacki
- Date of birth: 2 December 1959 (age 66)
- Place of birth: Sassenberg, North Rhine-Westphalia, West Germany
- Position: Forward

Youth career
- 1966–???: VfL Sassenberg
- ???–1978: FC Schalke 04

Senior career*
Years	Team	Apps	(Gls)
1978–1980	Holstein Kiel		
1980–1981	Eckernförder SV		
1981–1982	VfL Sassenberg		
1982–1983	FC Kaunitz		
1983–1984	FC Gütersloh		
1984–1995	FC Greffen		

International career
1971–1972	West Germany U16	10	
- * Club domestic league appearances and goals

Jürgen Kuzniacki (born 2 December 1959) is a German footballer and coach who played as a forward. He was primarily known for playing for Holstein Kiel in his initial senior career as well as being part of the winning squad of FC Gütersloh for the 1983–84 Oberliga Westfalen.

== Career ==
Kuzniacki began his playing career as a ten-year-old at VfL Sassenberg, moved to FC Schalke 04 and made ten appearances for the West Germany U16 as a youth player for The Royal Blues. In the 1978–79 2. Bundesliga, Kuzniacki was a member of Holstein Kiel's second division squad, made five league appearances and reached 14th place with the club in the North Division of the Second Bundesliga that season. He would continue to play for the club into the 1979–80 2. Bundesliga, but was unable to play any league games, as was undergoing military service in Eckernförde. For the 1980–81 Verbandsliga Schleswig-Holstein, he moved to Eckernförder SV, which played in the then Verbandsliga and reached 9th place in the season with the club.

For familial reasons, he then returned to Sassenberg, where he initially played for VfL again. This was followed by brief stints at FC Kaunitz in Verl and FC Gütersloh, which belonged to the Oberliga Westfalen during the season and became champions in the 1983–84 edition but failed in the subsequent promotion round to the 2. Bundesliga.

Kuzniacki then acted as player-coach from the age of 27 at FC Greffen in Harsewinkel and at DJK Rot-Weiß Milte in Warendorf, before ending his active career at the age of 38 and then only working as a coach. Throughout his coaching career, he primarily directed Warendorfer SU youth, Grün-Weiß Westkirchen in Ennigerloh, Warendorfer SU II. In 2018, Kuzniacki retired as a manager.
