= Altgermanische Wisentjagd =

Sculpture by Fritz Schaper in Berlin, Germany

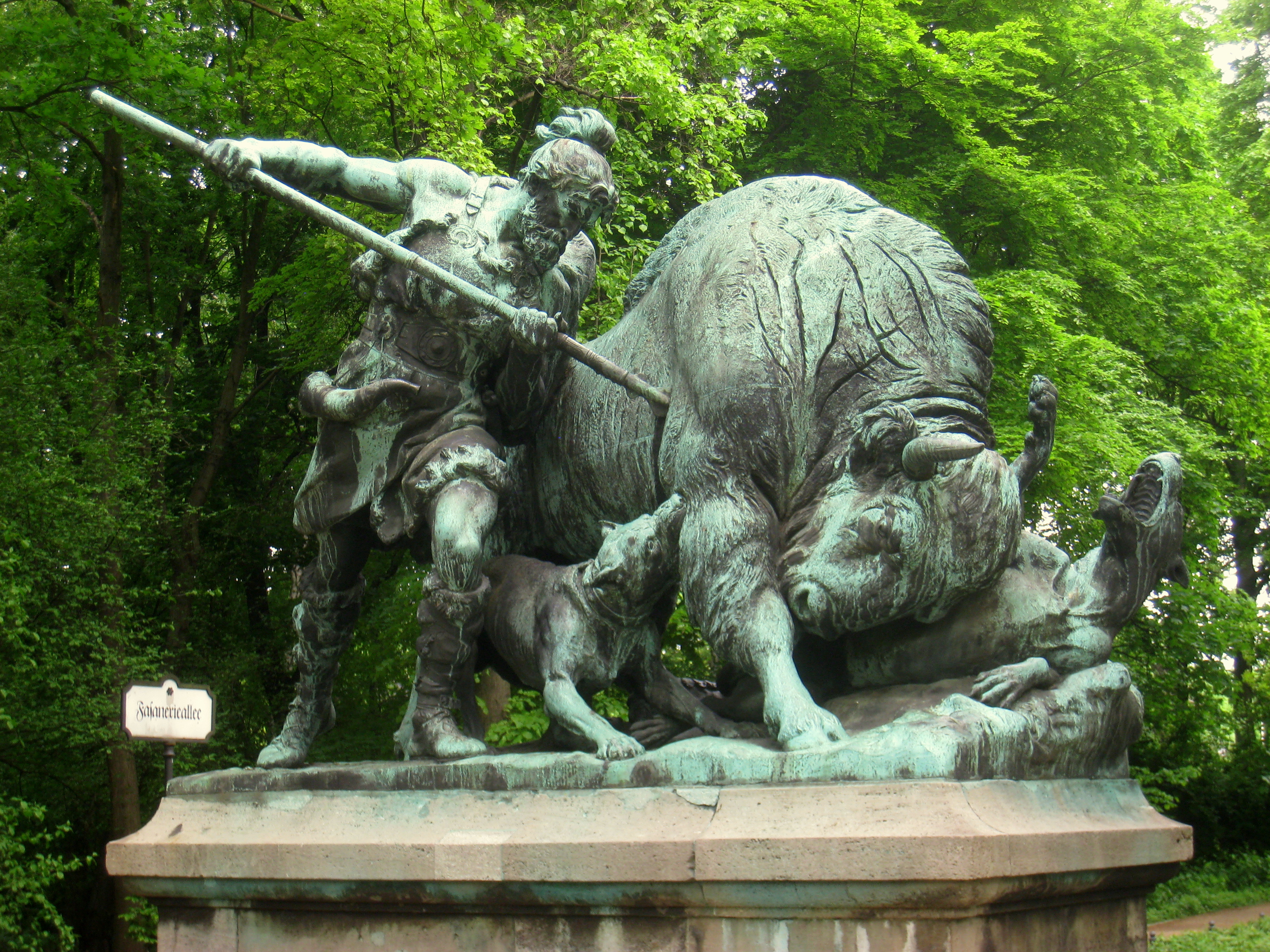
- The sculpture in 2010
- Artist: Fritz Schaper
- Medium: Sculpture
- Location: Berlin
- 52°30′48″N 13°20′55″E

Altgermanische Wisentjagd, or Altgermanische Büffeljagd, is an outdoor sculpture by Fritz Schaper, installed along Fasanerieallee in the Tiergarten, Berlin, Germany.
