= Joseph Uphues =

German sculptor

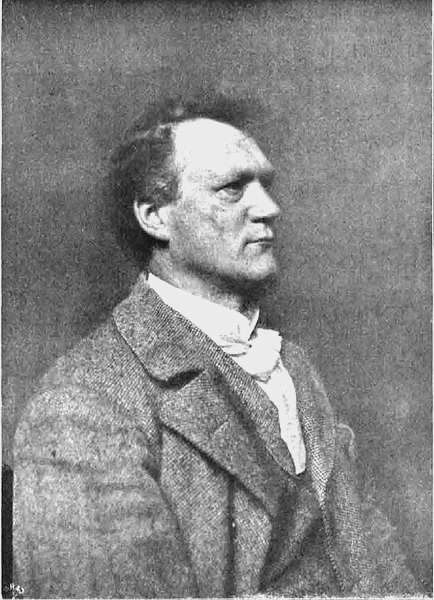
Joseph Uphues. Photograph from 1899.

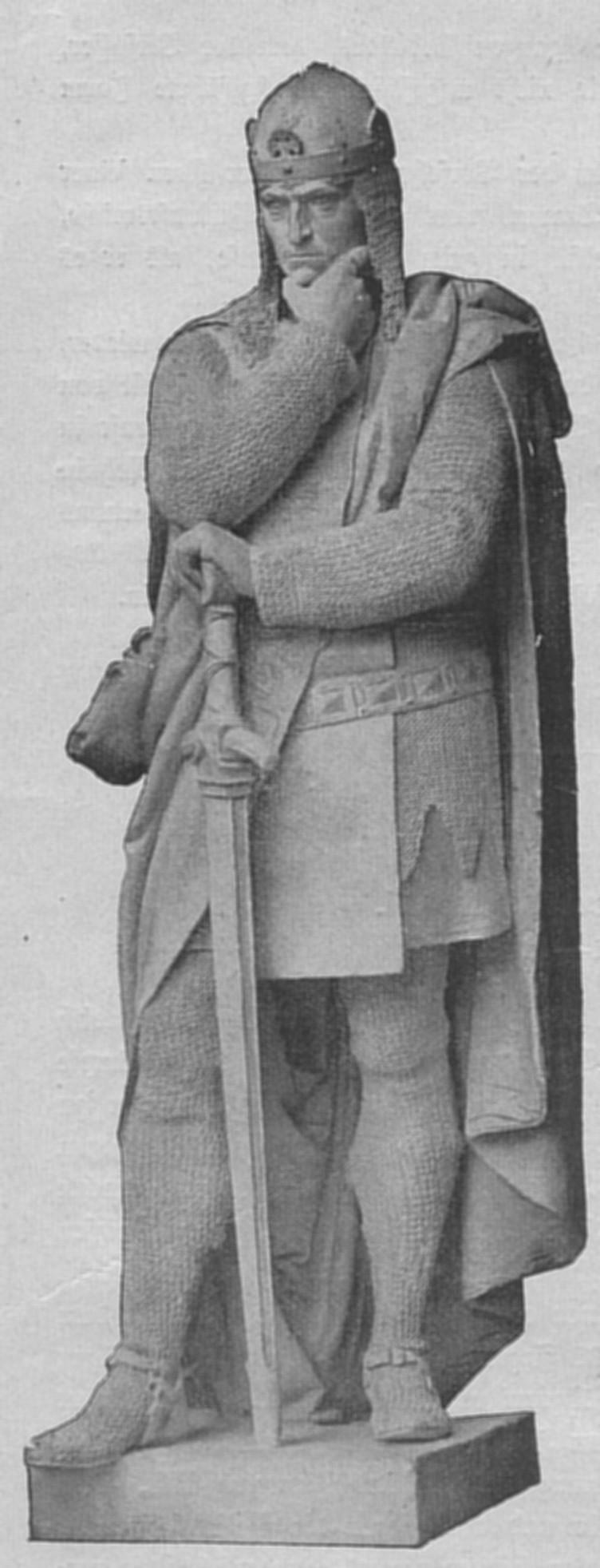
Postcard of Otto II from the Siegesallee; currently missing most of his right arm.

Joseph Johann Ludwig Uphues (23 May 1850, Sassenberg – 2 January 1911, Berlin) was a German sculptor.

== Life ==
After an apprenticeship as a carpenter, he embarked on a two-year tour of Belgium and the Netherlands. From 1870 to 1871, he learned stone masonry in Wiedenbrück. He worked there until 1878, when he entered the Prussian Academy of Arts, studying sculpture under Reinhold Begas and Fritz Schaper. In 1882 he was enrolled in Begas' Master Student class and worked as his assistant until 1891, opening his own studio in 1892. He became a Professor at the Academy and joined the Berlin Secession in 1899.

== The Siegesallee (Victory Avenue) ==
He was one of the sculptors commissioned to produce statues for the Siegesallee, a monumental project conceived by Kaiser Wilhelm II as his gift to the people of Berlin. Uphues produced two sets of figures, dedicated in 1899:

- Group 3, with Otto II, Margrave of Brandenburg as the centerpiece, flanked by Johann Gans Edler Herr zu Putlitz (founder of the Marienfließ Monastery in Prignitz) and Heinrich von Antwerpen (Provost of Brandenburg).
- Group 28, featuring Frederick the Great with side figures of Graf Kurt Christoph von Schwerin and Johann Sebastian Bach.

As is the case with virtually all of the Siegesallee statues, his were damaged during World War II and are currently displayed at the Spandau Citadel. The Bach figure has disappeared.

== Other selected major works ==
Berlin

- Equestrian statue of Kaiser Friedrich III, Luisenplatz (1905). Uphues also produced statues of him for Düren (1889), Bad Homburg vor der Höhe (1890) and Wiesbaden (1897).
- Statue of Helmuth von Moltke the Elder, which Uphues titled Der große Schweiger (roughly, "The Man of Few Words"), in the Königsplatz (1905). Uphues produced several Moltke memorials, including the ones in Düren (1902) and Mannheim (1902).

Düren

- Bismarck Memorial (1890)

Koblenz

- Johannes Peter Müller Memorial on the Jesuitenplatz (1899)

Wiesbaden

- Friedrich Schiller Memorial (1905)
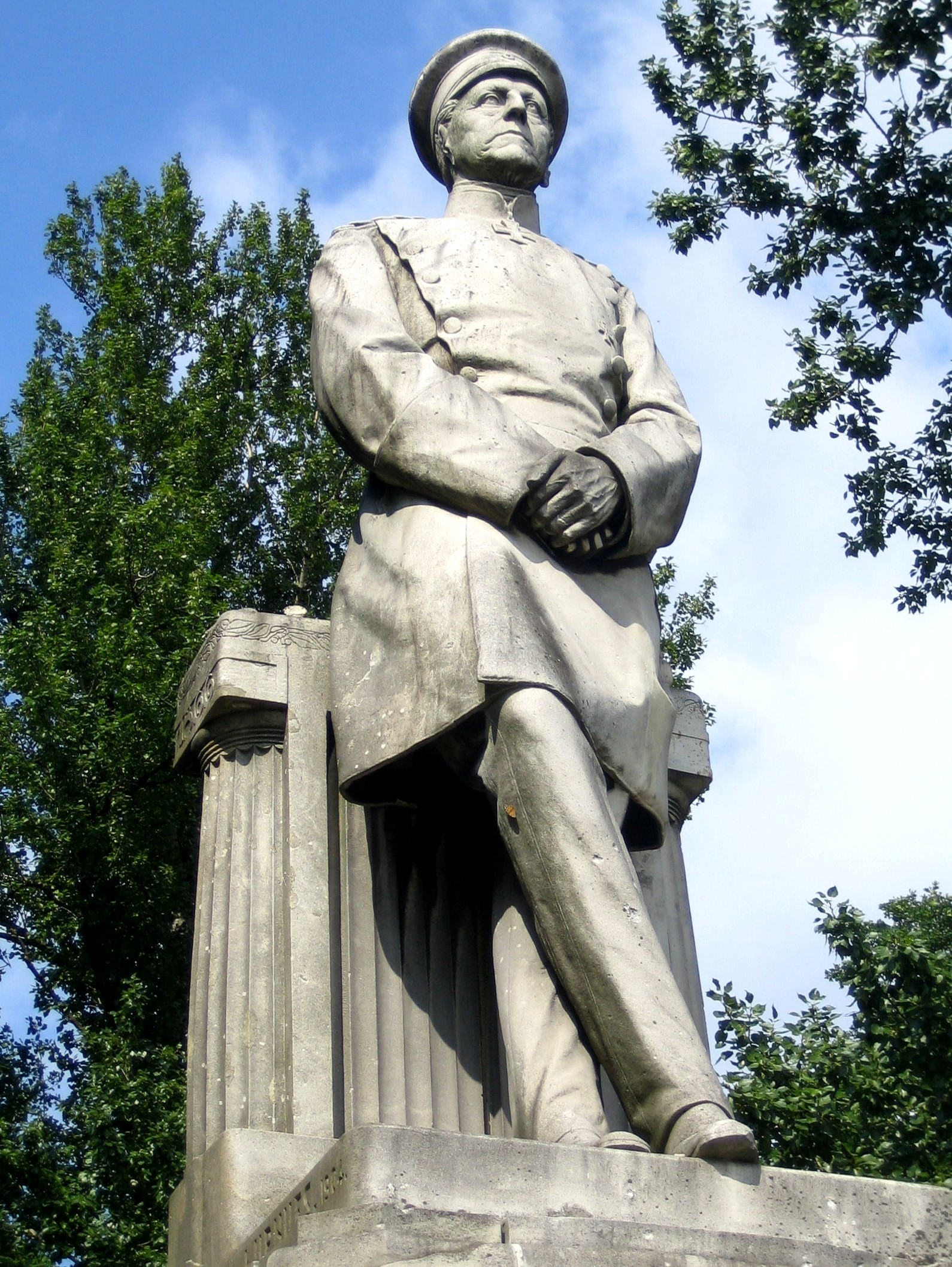
Statue of Helmuth von Moltke the Elder in the Tiergarten

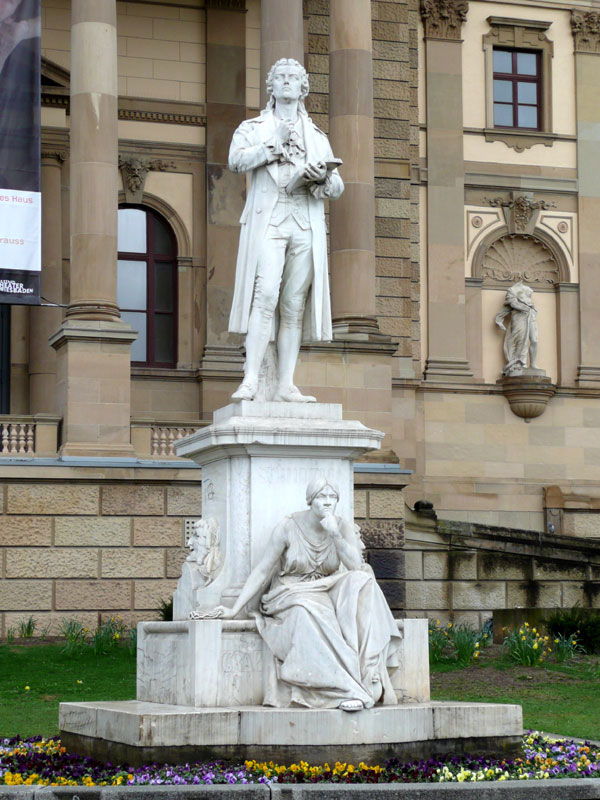
Schiller Memorial in Wiesbaden

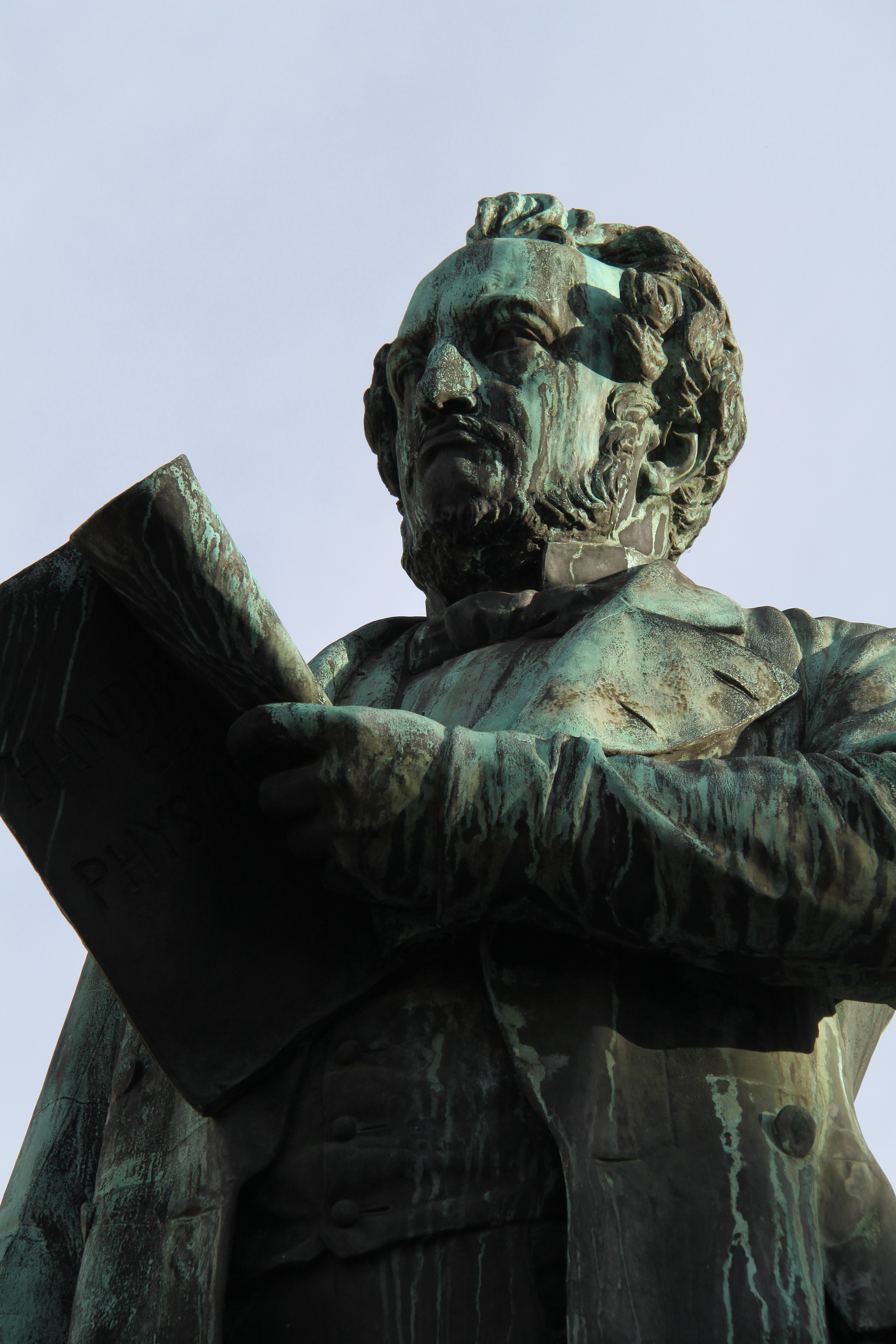
Johannes Müller Memorial, close-up

== Sources and further reading ==
- Brigitte Kaul: Joseph Johann Ludwig Uphues (1850–1911). Dissertation, Freie Universität Berlin, 1982.
- Joseph Uphues. In: Thieme-Becker: Allgemeines Lexikon der Bildenden Künstler von der Antike bis zur Gegenwart. Vol. 33, E. A. Seemann, Leipzig 1939, pg.586.
- Peter Bloch: Ethos und Pathos. Die Berliner Bildhauerschule 1786–1914. Catalog from the exhibition at the Sculpture Gallery of the Staatlichen Museen Preußischer Kulturbesitz from 19 May to 29 July 1990, ISBN 3-7861-1599-0, Vol. 1, pg. 570.
