= Statue of Helmuth von Moltke the Elder =

Statue in Berlin, Germany

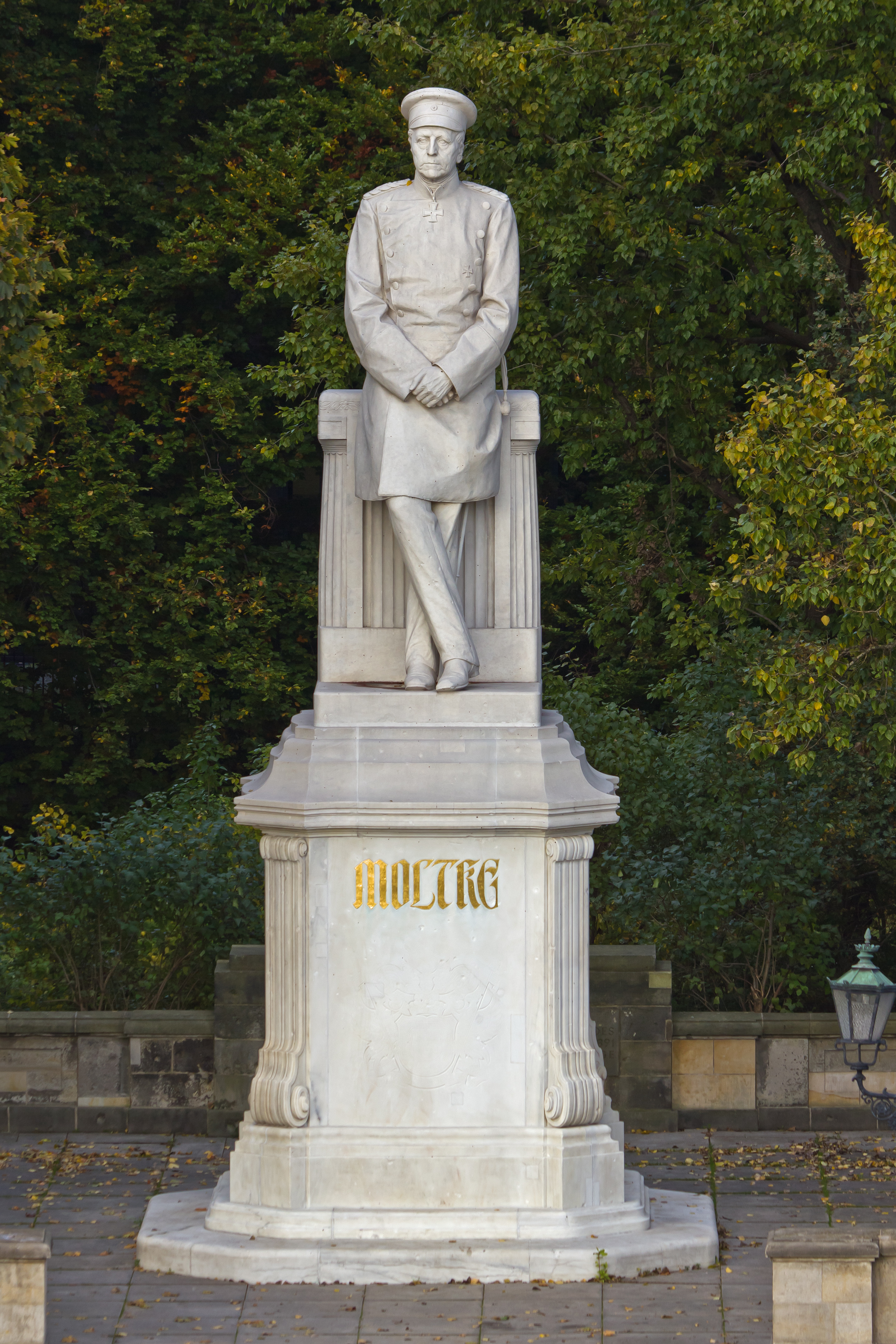
- The statue in 2013
- Artist: Joseph Uphues
- Subject: Helmuth von Moltke the Elder
- Location: Berlin, Germany; 52°30′56″N 13°21′02″E

The statue of Helmuth von Moltke the Elder by Joseph Uphues is located near the Berlin Victory Column in the Tiergarten, Berlin.
