= Renée Sintenis =

German artist

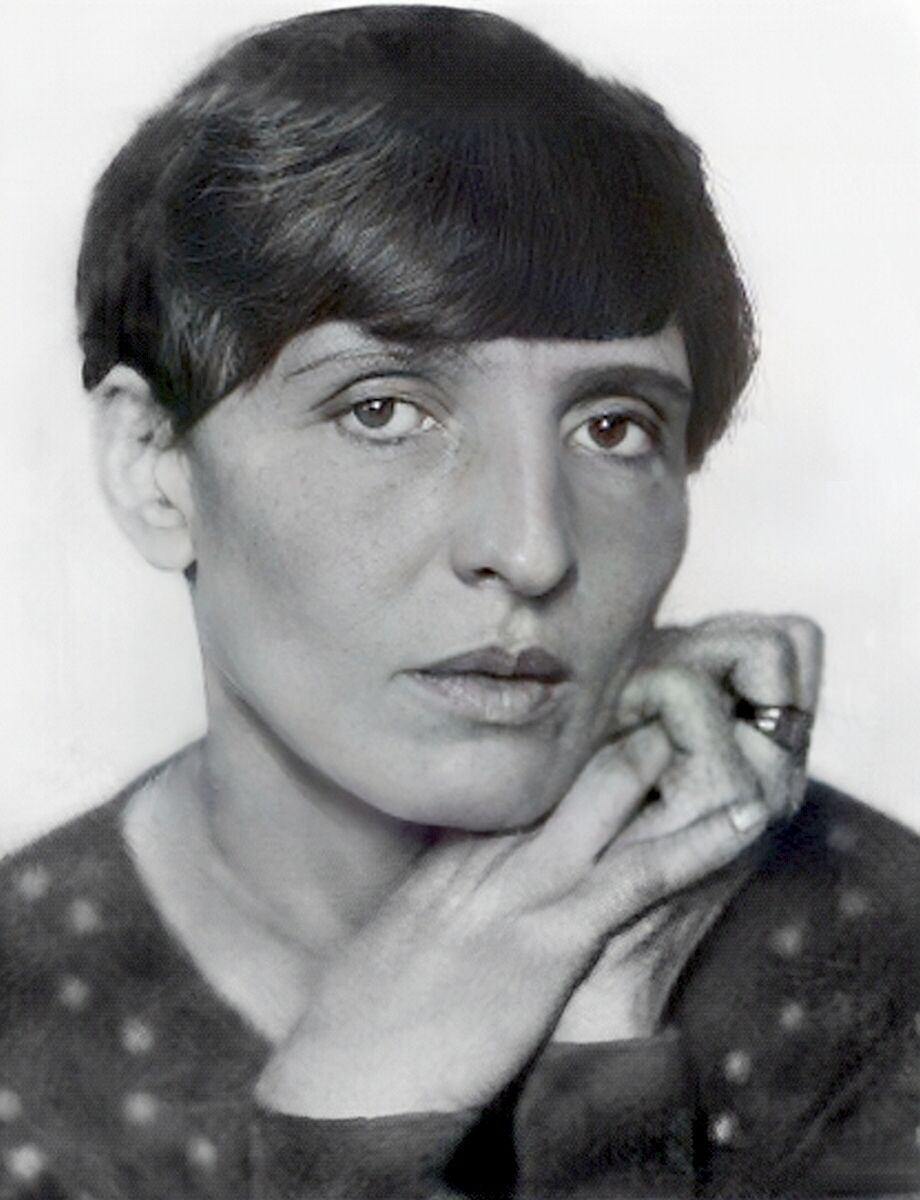
- Renée Sintenis in a photograph by Hugo Erfurth (1930)
- Born: Renate Alice Sintenis; 20 March 1888; Glatz, Prussian Silesia, German Empire (present-day Kłodzko, Poland)
- Died: 22 April 1965 (aged 77); West Berlin, West Germany
- Known for: Sculpture, medalist, graphic artist
- Movement: Expressionism

Olympic medal record

Art competitions
Bronze medal – third place	1928 Amsterdam	Sculpture

Renée Sintenis, née Renate Alice Sintenis (20 March 1888 – 22 April 1965), also known as Frau Emil R. Weiss, was a German sculptor, medallist, and graphic artist who worked in Berlin. She created mainly small-sized animal sculptures, female nudes, portraits, and sports statuettes. She is especially known for her Berlin Bear sculptures, which was used as the design for the Berlinale's top film award, the Golden Bear.

She was born in Glatz and died in West Berlin. In 1917, she married the painter and writer Emil Rudolf Weiß. In 1928 she won a bronze medal in the art competitions of the Olympic Games for her "Footballeur".

== Early life and education ==
Renate Alice Sintenis was born on 20 March 1888, the first of three children of Elisabeth Margarethe Sintenis, née Friedländer, and Franz Bernhard Sintenis, a lawyer. Her family name is of Huguenot origin (Sintenis is derived from Saint-Denis). She grew up in Neuruppin, where she lived until 1905. The daily proximity to nature influenced her later artistic work.

She spent her childhood and youth in Neuruppin, where her family had moved in 1888. After a short stay in Stuttgart, the family moved to Berlin in 1905, where her father had received a job at the higher court.

Sintenis took drawing lessons while she was still at school, which was followed by studies in decorative sculpture at the teaching institution of the Museum of Applied Arts in Berlin, with Wilhelm Haverkamp and Leo von König in 1907. In the fifth semester, she dropped out of studies to work as his father's secretary on his instructions. She finally evaded the unwanted activity by breaking with her family, which caused her severe problems, including depression, for a long time.

== Career ==
When Renée Sintenis (as she called herself from then on) met the sculptor Georg Kolbe in 1910, she became his model. She modelled for a now lost life-sized statue.

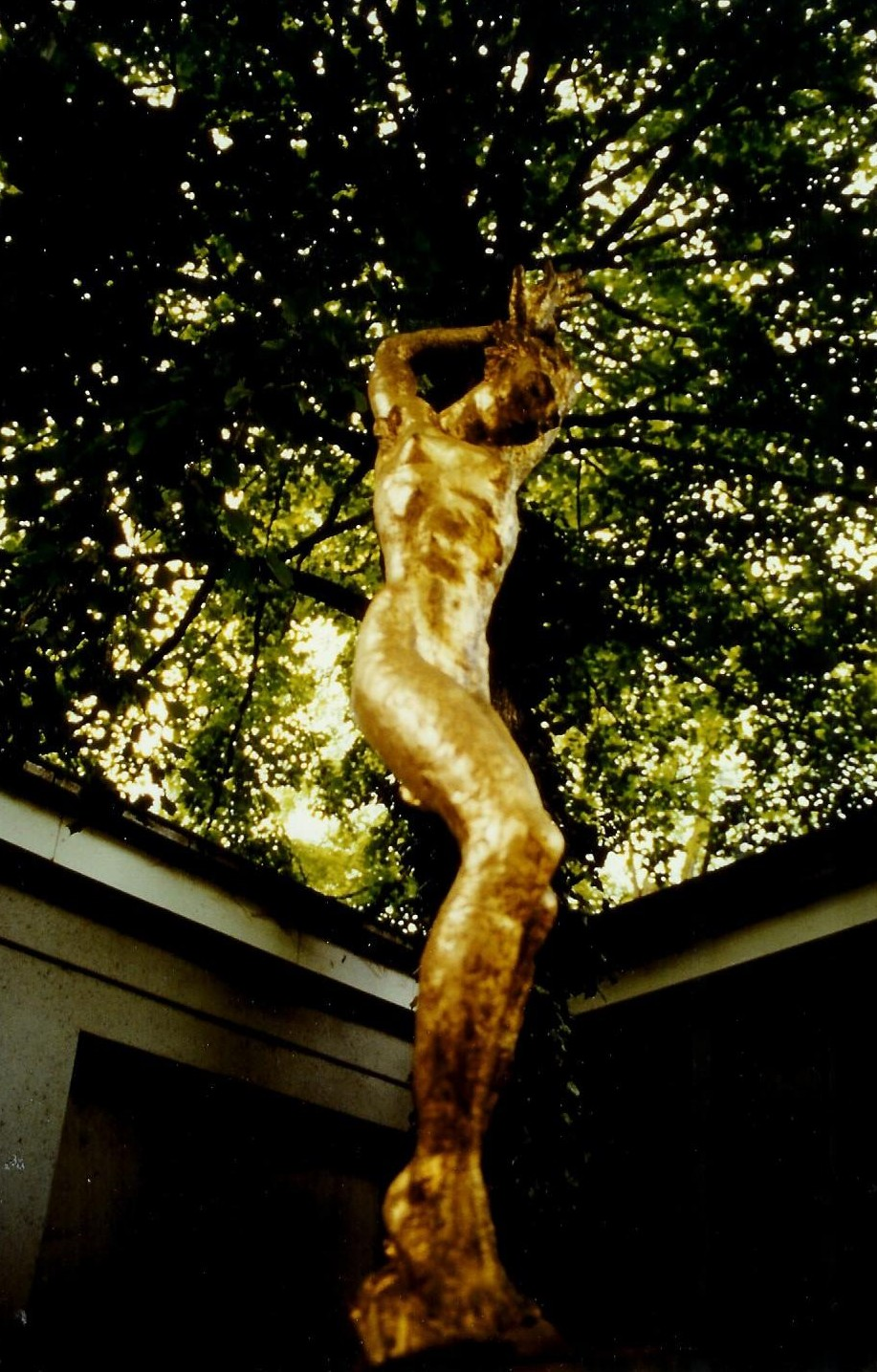
Daphne

Inspired by this activity, she began creating in sculpture female nudes, expressive heads like those of André Gide and Joachim Ringelnatz, athletes like the Finnish runner Paavo Nurmi, and self-portraits in drawings, sculptures (in terracotta) and etchings.

After 1915, the concise animal figures emerged, which became the subject of her artistic life. Since she rejected monumentality in sculpture, she mainly created small-format sculptures. These small works of art such as horses, deer, donkeys and dogs, enjoyed great popularity with the public because they were cheaper, suitable as gifts and could be placed in small rooms.

From attending Kolbe's studio, a long-term friendship developed, which he accompanied artistically. In the 1913 Berlin autumn exhibition, the first major exhibition of the Free Secession, Sintenis took part (as in the following years) with small-format plaster sculptures.

From 1913 on, she had her works cast in the Hermann Noack fine art foundry, which she attended artistically for decades.

In 1917 she married the type artist, book designer, painter and illustrator Emil Rudolf Weiß, whom she had met years earlier as her teacher and fatherly friend. He supported her and introduced her to numerous other artists. Their collaboration was limited to a few joint projects, of which the edition of the 22 Songs of the poems by Sappho, for which she created the etchings and Weiß made the font designs, achieved particular fame.

From 1913 she exhibited her sculptures regularly and was highly valued by her colleagues from the Free Secession, the most important Berlin artists' association, among others, by Max Liebermann, Max Beckmann, and Karl Schmidt-Rottluff. The opening of a gallery in Berlin in 1922 made her the most important protagonist of the well-known Flechtheim art circle in those years. The art-interested public was infatuated with her athletic figures, portraits of friends and the small-format self-portraits.

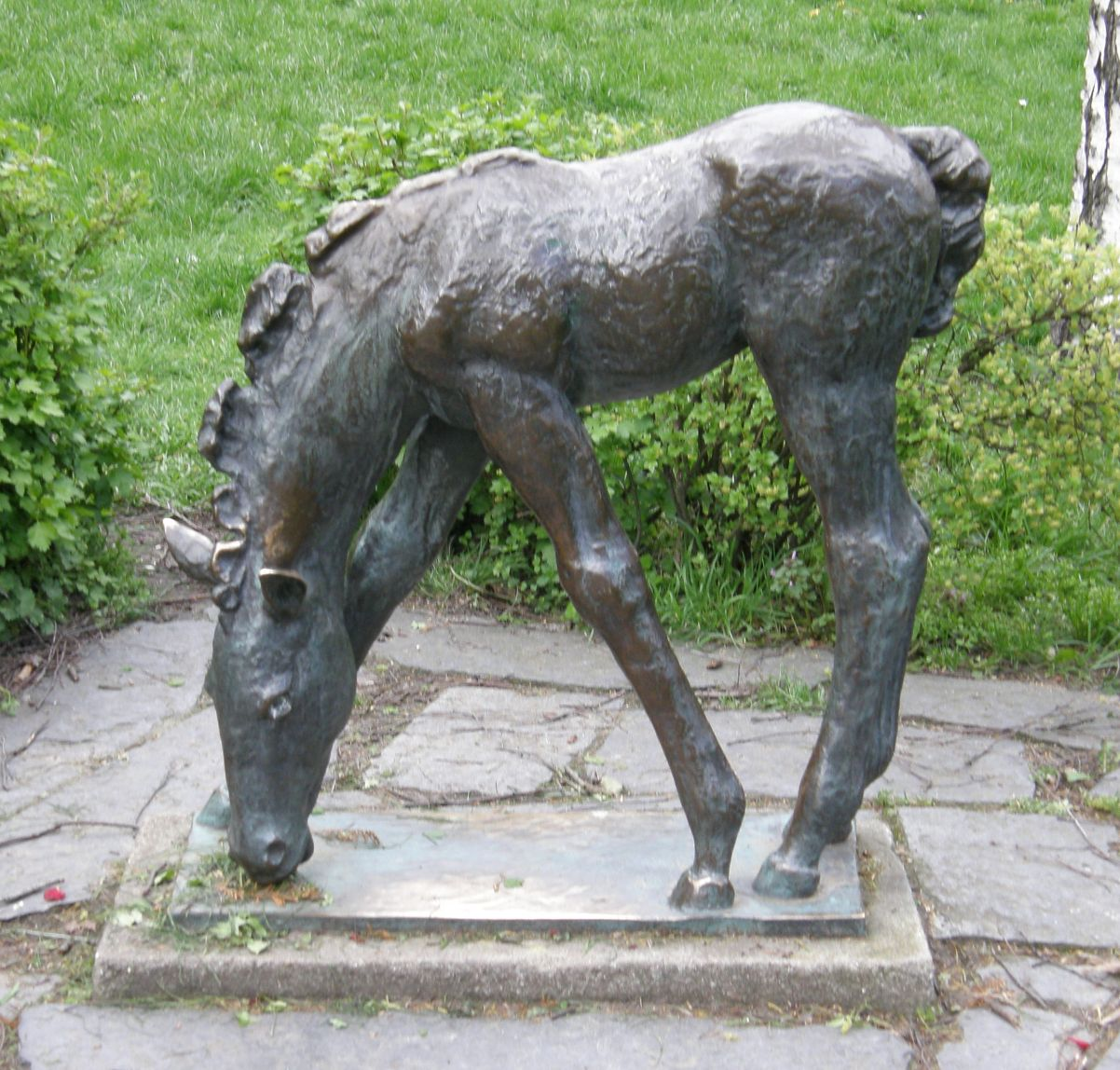
Grazing Foal

In addition, due to her height, slim figure, charisma, her self-confident, fashionable demeanor and androgynous beauty, she was often portrayed by artists like her husband, Emil Rudolf Weiß and Georg Kolbe, and by photographers, like Hugo Erfurth, Fritz Eschen, Jaro von Tucholka and Frieda Riess. She embodied perfectly the type of the 'new woman' of the 1920s, even if she appeared rather reserved.

During the Weimar Republic, Renée Sintenis became an internationally recognized artist, with exhibitions in the Berlin Nationalgalerie, in Berlin, in Paris, the Tate Gallery, in London, the Museum of Modern Art, in New York, Glasgow and Rotterdam. Her small-sized depictions of athletes (boxers, footballers, runners) and portrait busts of their circle of friends were found in public and private collections around the world.

In 1928 Sintenis won the bronze medal in the sculpture section of the art competition for the Summer Olympics in Amsterdam, for her "Footballeur". She is thought to be the first LGBTQ+ Olympic medallist. Renée Sintenis took part in the 1929 exhibition of the German Association of Artists in the Cologne State House, with five small-format animal sculptures. In 1930 she met the French sculptor Aristide Maillol in Berlin. In 1931 she was appointed as the first sculptor, and second woman after Käthe Kollwitz, together with 13 other artists, to join the Berlin Academy of the Arts – Fine Arts section, although the National Socialists forced her to leave in 1934.

In 1932, she created a statue of the Berlin Bear, a bear standing on its hind legs with its arms raised, based on the Coat of arms of Berlin. The design was popular, and she sold many 15 cm (5.9 in) statues of the bear, which brought wealth and was taken up again in later life.

=== Third Reich ===
Emil Rudolf Weiß was dismissed from his university post on 1 April 1933, because of an angry statement against the Nazi regime and the law to reintroduce the civil service. Sintenis herself was excluded from the Academy of the Arts in 1934 because of her Jewish origins – her maternal grandmother was Jewish before her conversion. Nevertheless, she was able to stay in the Reich Chamber of Culture, even if her works were removed from public collections by the National Socialists.

During the Third Reich, Renée Sintenis and her husband Emil Rudolf Weiß lived with considerable restrictions. She continued to exhibit, although one of her self-portraits was shown in the Degenerate Art exhibition in Munich in 1937. Since she was not banned from exhibiting, she was represented in Düsseldorf by the art dealer Alex Vömel, Flechtheim's successor. In contrast to the 1920s, she was not doing well financially, which was reinforced by the bronze casting ban of 1941.

Until the forced dissolution of the Deutscher Künstlerbund in 1936, Sintenis remained a member of the German Association of Artists. That she was sponsored by the NSDAP propagandist Hans Hinkel, as it was later claimed, has not been proven and is highly unlikely.

Her husband died unexpectedly on 7 November 1942 in Meersburg on the Lake Constance. His death plunged Sintenis into a deep crisis. As a result, she took over his studio in the Künstlerhaus on Kurfürstenstrasse, where Max Pechstein also worked. His family temporarily took her in when her studio house was destroyed by arson and several Allied bombings in 1945. Sintenis lost almost all of her possessions; all papers and parts of her work were lost. While most of the cast models were preserved, the plaster frames of most of the portrait heads were also destroyed. In a self-portrait mask from 1944, the hardships of the war years are visible in her features.

=== Post-war career ===
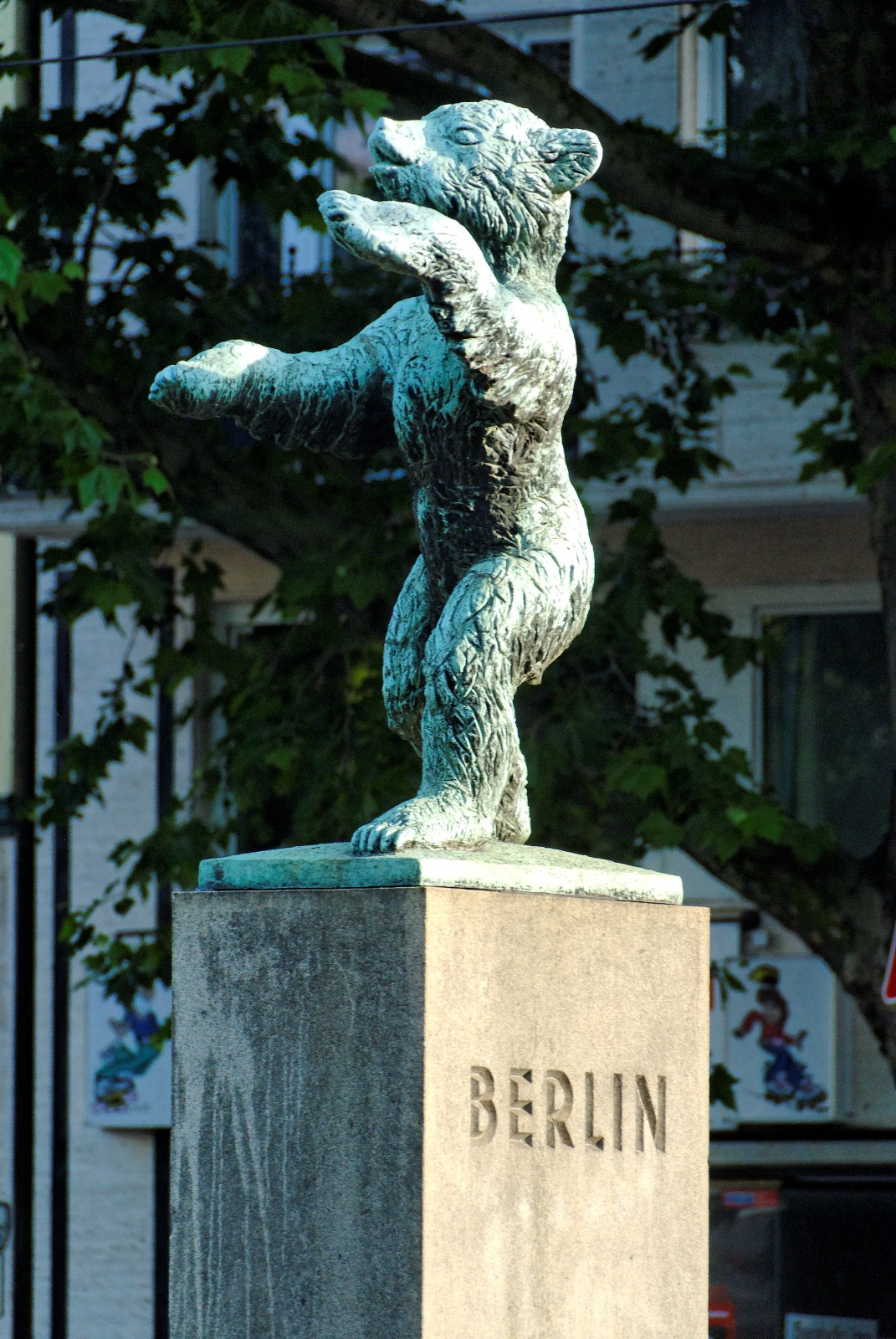
The Berlin Bear in Düsseldorf

After the war, Sintenis and her partner Magdalena Goldmann moved into an apartment on Innsbrucker Strasse in 1945, where they both lived until their deaths. In 1948, Sintenis received the art prize of the city of Berlin and was appointed by Karl Hofer to the Berlin University of Fine Arts. She was appointed full professor in 1955, although she gave up teaching the same year. She was also appointed to the newly founded Academy of the Arts of Berlin (West) in 1955.

In the 1950s, she became very successful once again. She stayed true to her artistic focus and motifs, which she called "making animals".

In 1953, replicas of her Bär were awarded for the first time as trophies at the third Berlin International Film Festival (Berlinale), and have been handed out as the top award, the bronze Golden Bear, ever since. Various Silver Bear awards were introduced not long afterwards.

In 1957, Sintenis' statue of the Berlin Bear was erected as a life-size bronze sculpture on the median of what is now the Bundesautobahn 115 between Dreilinden and the Zehlendorf motorway junction. The then-Governing Mayor of Berlin, Willy Brandt, inaugurated another copy on the Berliner Allee in Düsseldorf on 23 September 1960. On 6 June 1962, a bronze monument of the Berlin bear was erected in the median of the Bundesautobahn 9 at the level of today's junction Munich-Fröttmaning-Süd.

In 1963, a bear was presented to John F. Kennedy, who was visiting the country.

== Later life, death and legacy ==
On her 70th birthday in 1958, the Haus am Waldsee in Berlin dedicated her a retrospective of her work.

Sintenis died on 22 April 1965. Her grave is in the Waldfriedhof in Berlin-Dahlem, where she is accompanied by Goldmann, who outlived her by 20 years and was her sole heir. The grave site is one of the honor graves of the State of Berlin.

In 2018, her work was included in the exhibition Lesbian Visions, curated by Birgit Bosold and Carina Klugbauer, at the Schwules Museum in Berlin.

A bear created by Noack in 1976 stands in Griffith Park, Los Angeles, with a plaque reading "To the people of the United States of America in gratitude for their aid, friendship and protection. Presented to our sister city, Los Angeles by the people of free Berlin".

As of 2022, Golden Bear awards continue to be made by Noack for the Berlinale winners.

== Honors ==
She was presented with prestigious awards, such as the "Knight of the Peace Class" of the order Pour le Mérite, in 1952, and the Great Federal Order of Merit in 1953.

== Public collections ==
- Art Institute of Chicago
- The Museum of Modern Art, New York
- National Gallery of Art, Washington, D.C.
- Los Angeles County Museum of Art

== Sources ==
- Ursel Berger, 'Selbst ein Fohlen sein: Die Tierbildhauerin Renée Sintenis', in Ursel Berger and Günter Ladwig (eds), Tierplastik deutscher Bildhauer des 20. Jahrhunderts: Sammlung Karl H. Knauf, Berlin: Georg-Kolbe-Museum, 2009, pp. 65–71.
- Ursel Berger and Günter Ladwig, Renée Sintenis: Das plastische Werk, Berlin: Karl H. Knauf, 2013.
- Britta Buhlmann, Renée Sintenis: Werkmonographie der Skulpturen, Darmstadt: Wissenschaftliche Buchgesellschaft, 1987.
- Nina Lübbren, 'Ornament, Monument and Gender in German Sculpture, 1910-1930: Milly Steger and Renée Sintenis', in Imogen Hart and Claire Jones (eds), Sculpture and the Decorative in Britain and Europe: Seventeenth Century to Contemporary, New York, London etc.: Bloomsbury, 2020, pp. 189–210.
- Nina Lübbren, ‘Renée Sintenis, Wendt & Kühn, Lotte Pritzel: Modes, Markets and Materials in Domestic Objects, 1910-1930’, in Deborah Ascher Barnstone and Maria Makela (eds), Material Modernity: Innovations in Art, Design, and Architecture in the Weimar Republic, London etc.: Bloomsbury, 2022, pp. 221–246.
- Erich Ranfft, 'German Women Sculptors 1918-1936: Gender Differences and Status', in Marsha Meskimmon and Shearer West (eds), Visions of the 'Neue Frau': Women and the Visual Arts in Weimar Germany, Brookfied, Vermont/Aldershot, Hants: Scolar Press/Ashgate, 1995, pp. 42–61, plates 4-10.
- Ines Schlenker, 'Renée Sintenis', in Delia Gaze (ed.), Dictionary of Women Artists, vol.2, London and Chicago: Fitzroy Dearborn, 1997, pp. 1270–1272.
