= Churfürstliche Fuchsjagd =

Sculpture in Berlin, Germany

- Die Fuchsjagd zur Kaiserzeit, Zeitgenössische Fuchsjagd
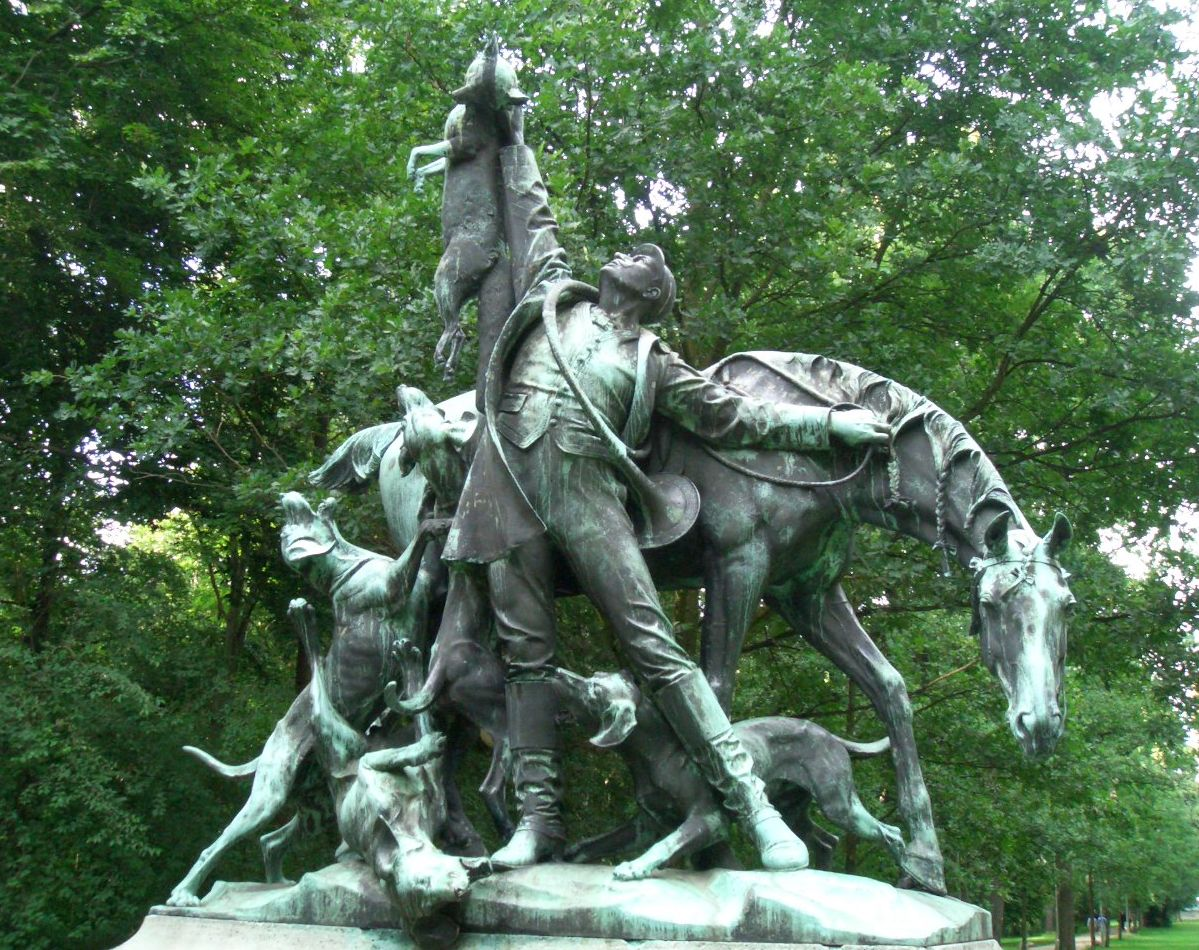
- The sculpture in 2008
- Artist: Wilhelm Haverkamp
- Year: 1904
- Location: Berlin, Germany
- 52°30′42″N 13°20′47″E

Churfürstliche Fuchsjagd, also known as Die Fuchsjagd zur Kaiserzeit or Zeitgenössische Fuchsjagd, is an outdoor 1904 sculpture by Wilhelm Haverkamp, installed at Fasanerieallee in the Tiergarten, Berlin, Germany.
