= Eberjagd um 1500 =

Sculpture by Karl Begas in Tiergarten, Berlin, Germany

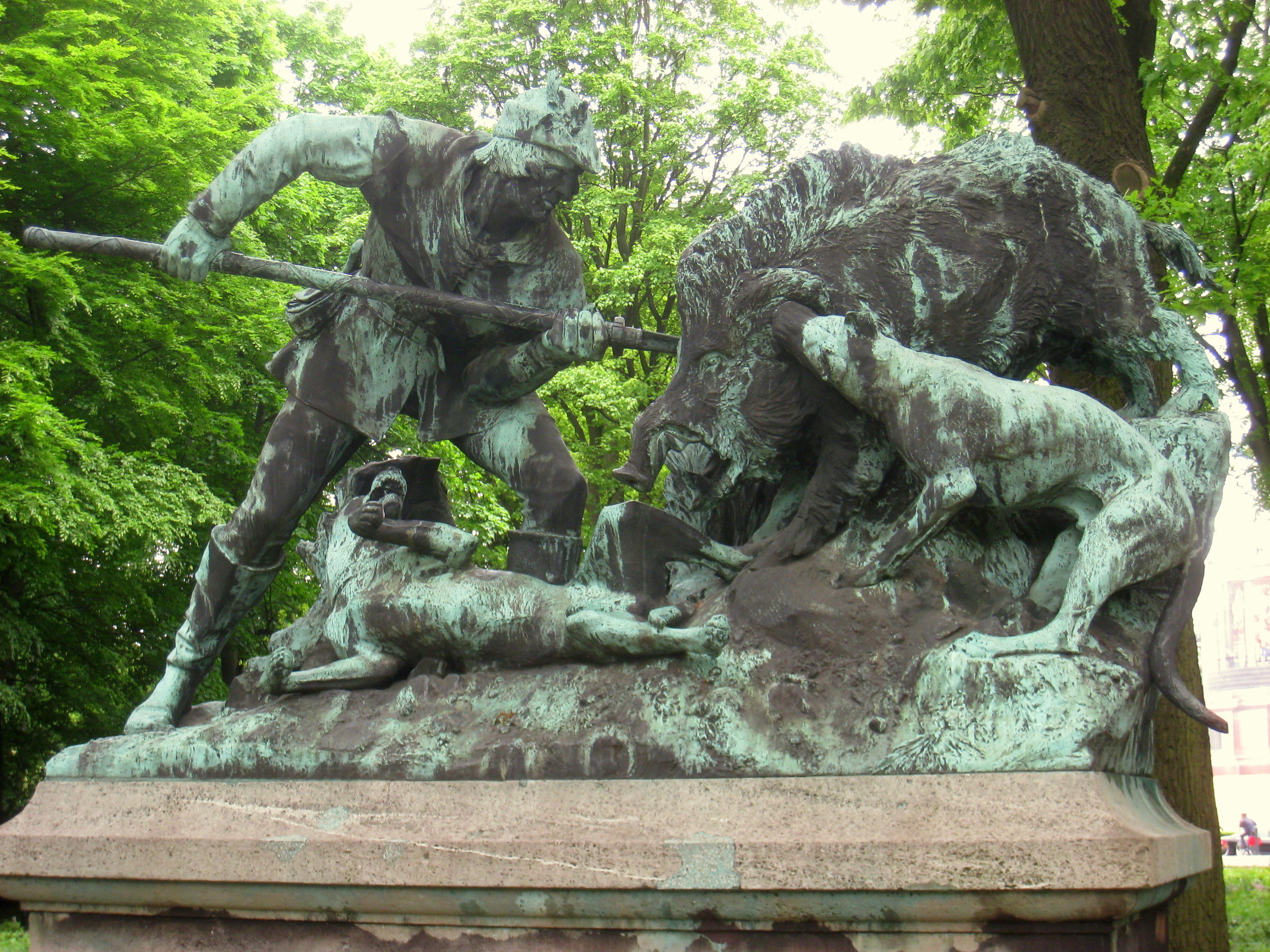
- The sculpture in 2010
- Artist: Karl Begas
- Location: Berlin, Germany
- 52°30′48″N 13°20′55″E

Eberjagd um 1500 is an outdoor sculpture by Karl Begas, installed at Fasanerieallee in Tiergarten, Berlin, Germany.
