= Max Baumbach =

German sculptor

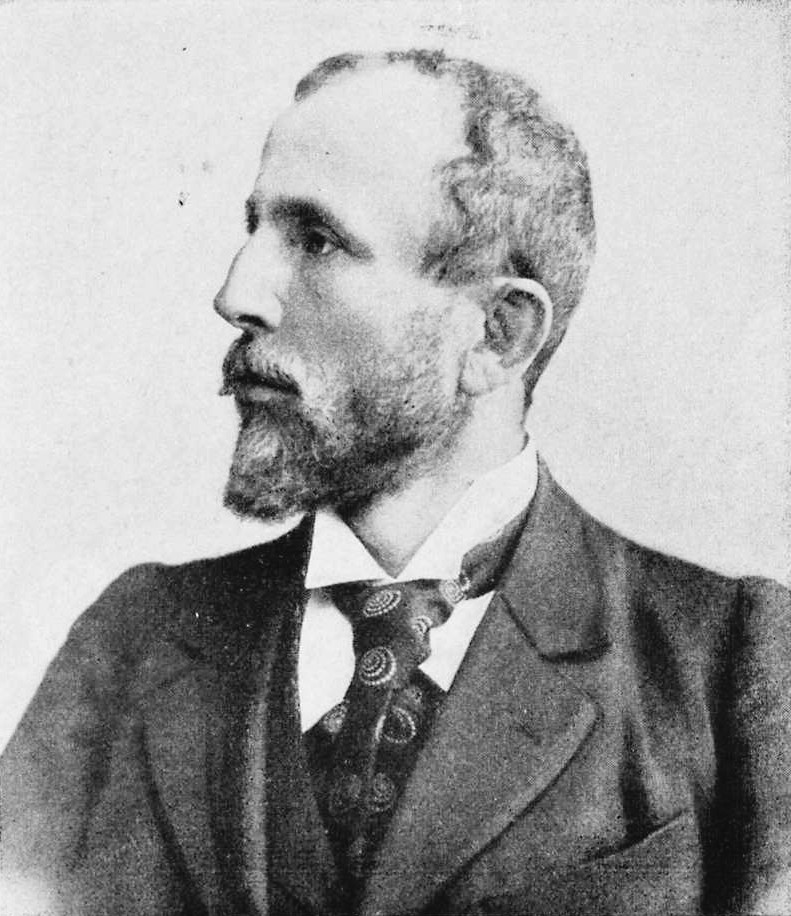
Max Baumbach (1904)

Max Baumbach (28 November 1859, Wurzen – 4 October 1915, Berlin) was a German sculptor.

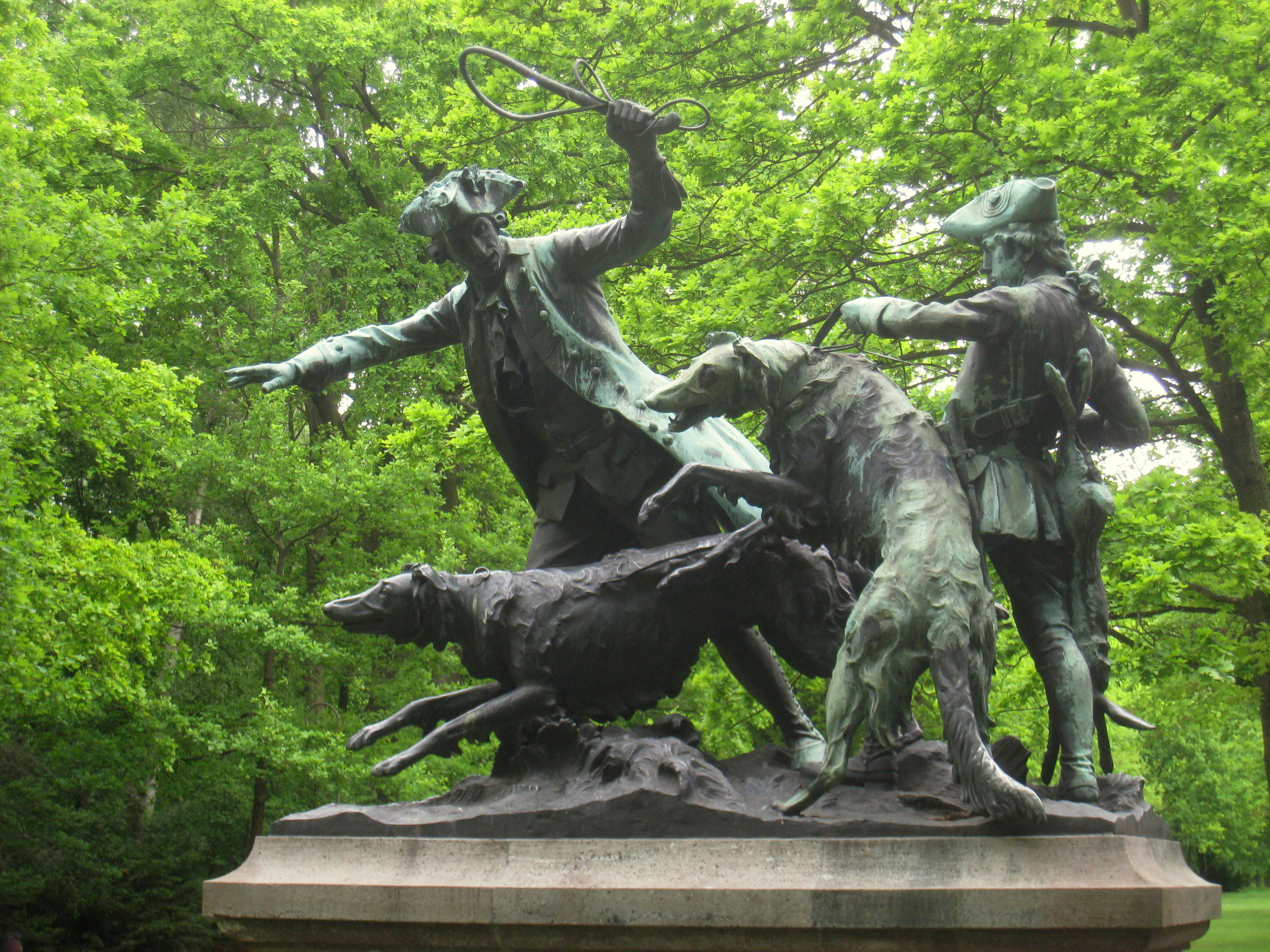
Rabbit Hunting in the Rococo Period (1903)

== Life ==
He studied at the Prussian Academy of Arts under Fritz Schaper and Karl Begas. In 1885, he began presenting his own exhibitions throughout Germany, as well as at the 1893 Chicago World's Fair. His favorite subjects involved heroic poses of emperors and other royalty.

In 1899–1900, he sculpted the figures for Group 5 of the Siegesallee project; a double statue of Johann I and his brother Otto III, Margraves of Brandenburg, studying the City Charter of Cölln as the centerpiece, with busts of Simeon von Cölln (witness to the Charter) and Marsilius de Berlin (the first documented judge in that city) as side figures.

Among his other significant works are an equestrian statue of King Albert of Saxony in front of the "Ständehaus" in Dresden, a bronze monument of Friedrich Wilhelm von Seydlitz in Trebnitz (now Trzebnica, Poland), a group of six figures depicting the "Protesting Princes" of 1529 in the Gedächtniskirche (Speyer) and a monument to Kaiser Friedrich III in Wörth, which earned him a professorship. Unfortunately, it was destroyed in World War II.

== Works ==
- Hasenhatz zur Rokokozeit, Tiergarten, Berlin, Germany
