= Wilhelm Haverkamp =

German sculptor and medallist

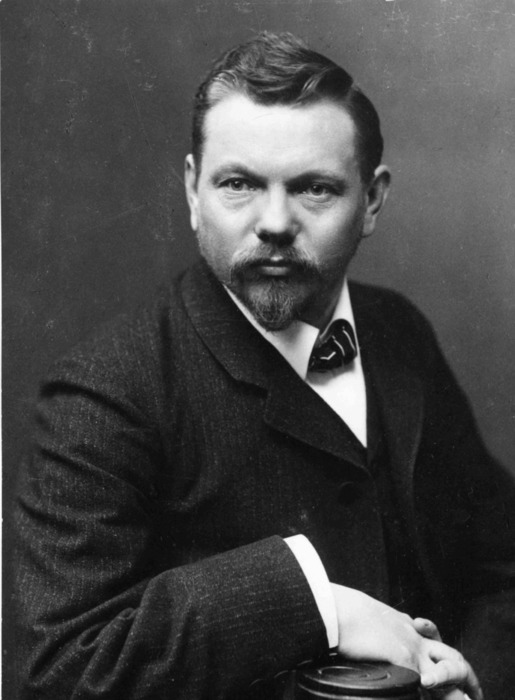
- Born: March 4, 1864; Senden
- Died: January 13, 1929 (aged 64); Berlin, Germany
- Education: Prussian Academy of Arts
- Spouse: Margarethe Ferlmann

Wilhelm Haverkamp (4 March 1864, in Senden – 13 January 1929, in Berlin) was a German sculptor and medallist, in the Historicist style.

== Life and work ==
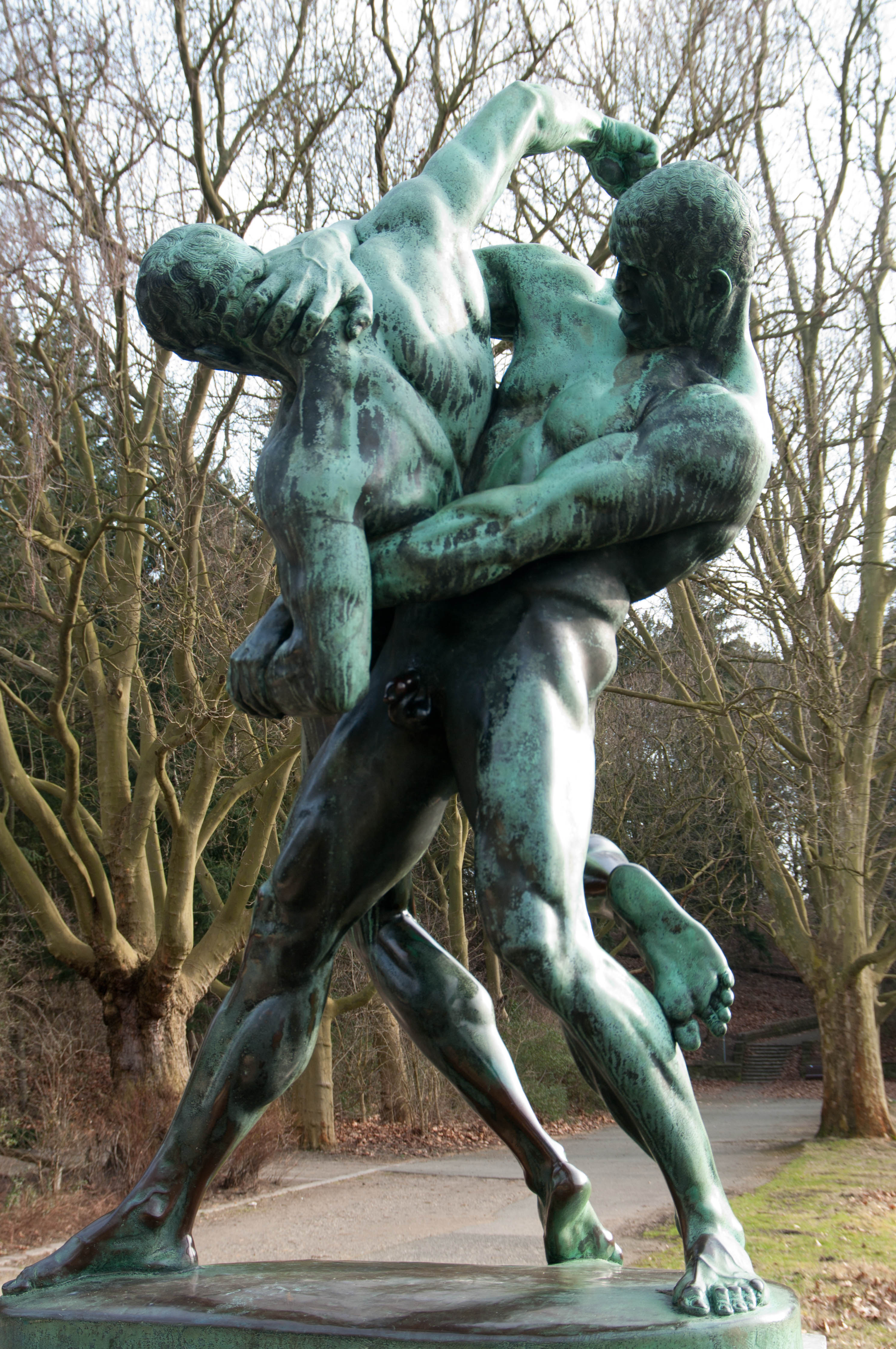
Wrestlers

From 1866, at the age of two, until 1877, he was raised by his mother's parents in Nordkirchen and attended elementary school there. This was followed by two apprenticeships as a wood and stone sculptor; with August Schmiemann (1877–81) and Heinrich Fleige (1881–83), in Münster. With the help of a scholarship, won in a competition, he was able to attend the Prussian Academy of Arts, where he studied with Albert Wolff until 1885, then with Fritz Schaper.

After completing his studies in 1887, he remained with Schaper as an assistant for two years, then went to Paris. That same year, he applied for the Prussian Academy's "Rome Prize" (modelled after the French Prix de Rome), which he received in 1890. While in Rome, he stayed at the Villa Strohl-Fern, where he was mentored by Robert Cauer. During his stay, he created decorations for the entrance to the Villa Hüffer, owned by the merchant, Wilhelm Hüffer (1821-1895), and some items for his official sponsor, the Münster District Court President, Bernhard Lohaus. He also did some work at the Basilica of St. Augustine.

When he returned from Rome in 1892, he married Margarethe Ferlmann of Senden, the adopted daughter of one of his uncles who had emigrated to the United States. They lived in Berlin, where he taught at the instructional annex of the Arts and Crafts Museum. In 1899, he was awarded the Order of Albert the Bear. Two years later, he was presented with a small gold medal at the Große Berliner Kunstausstellung and named a Knight in the Order of the Red Eagle.

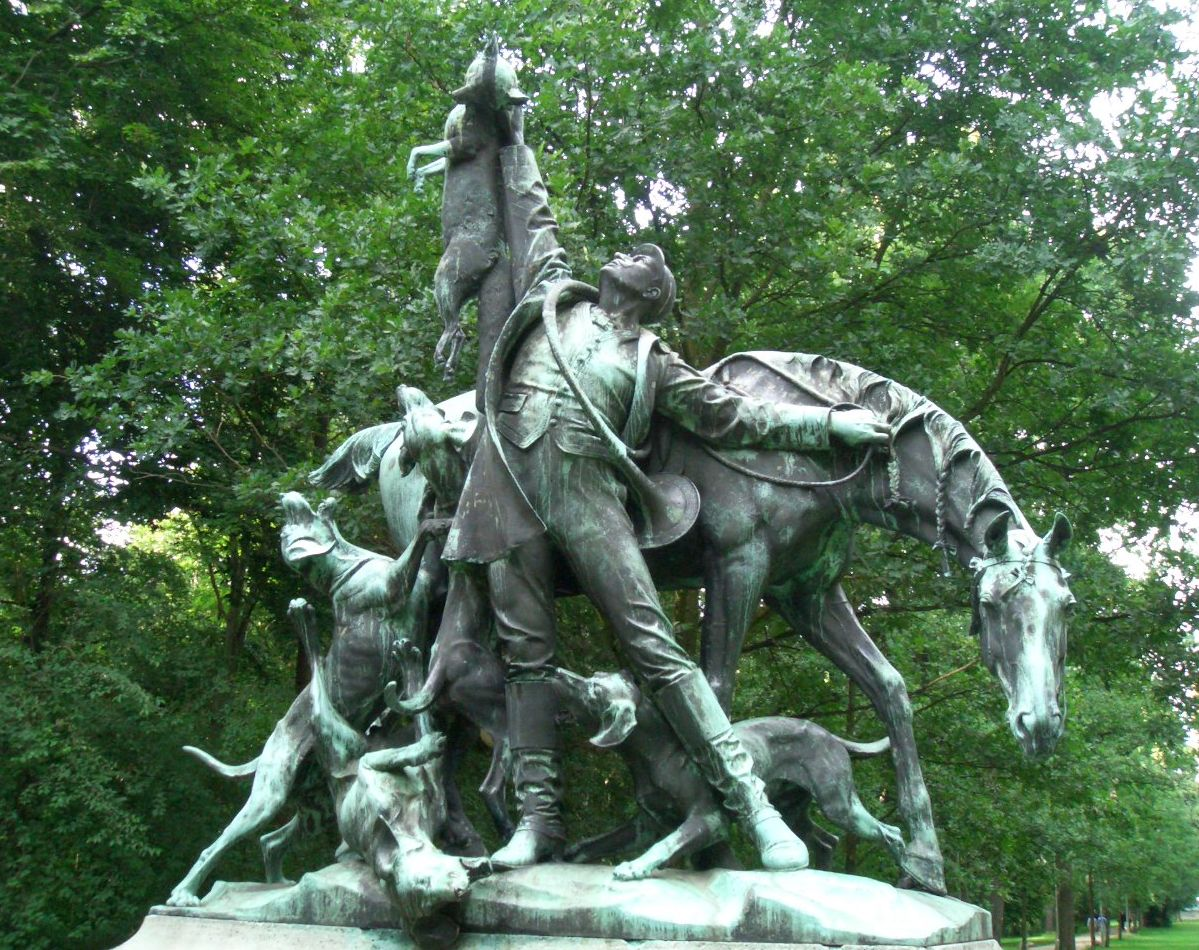
Imperial Fox Hunt

He was named a Professor at the Museum in 1903, succeeding Ludwig Manzel, who had been promoted. His best known students include Heinrich Splieth, Gustav Wallat, Renée Sintenis, and Wilhelm Kruse. In 1909, he was awarded another gold medal at the Große Münchener Kunstausstellung, and received a second one in Berlin in 1913. That same year, he was named a member of the Prussian State Art Commission. In 1916, he became a full member of the Prussian Academy. He retired from all of his positions in 1924.
