= Hasenhatz zur Rokokozeit =

Sculpture in Berlin, Germany

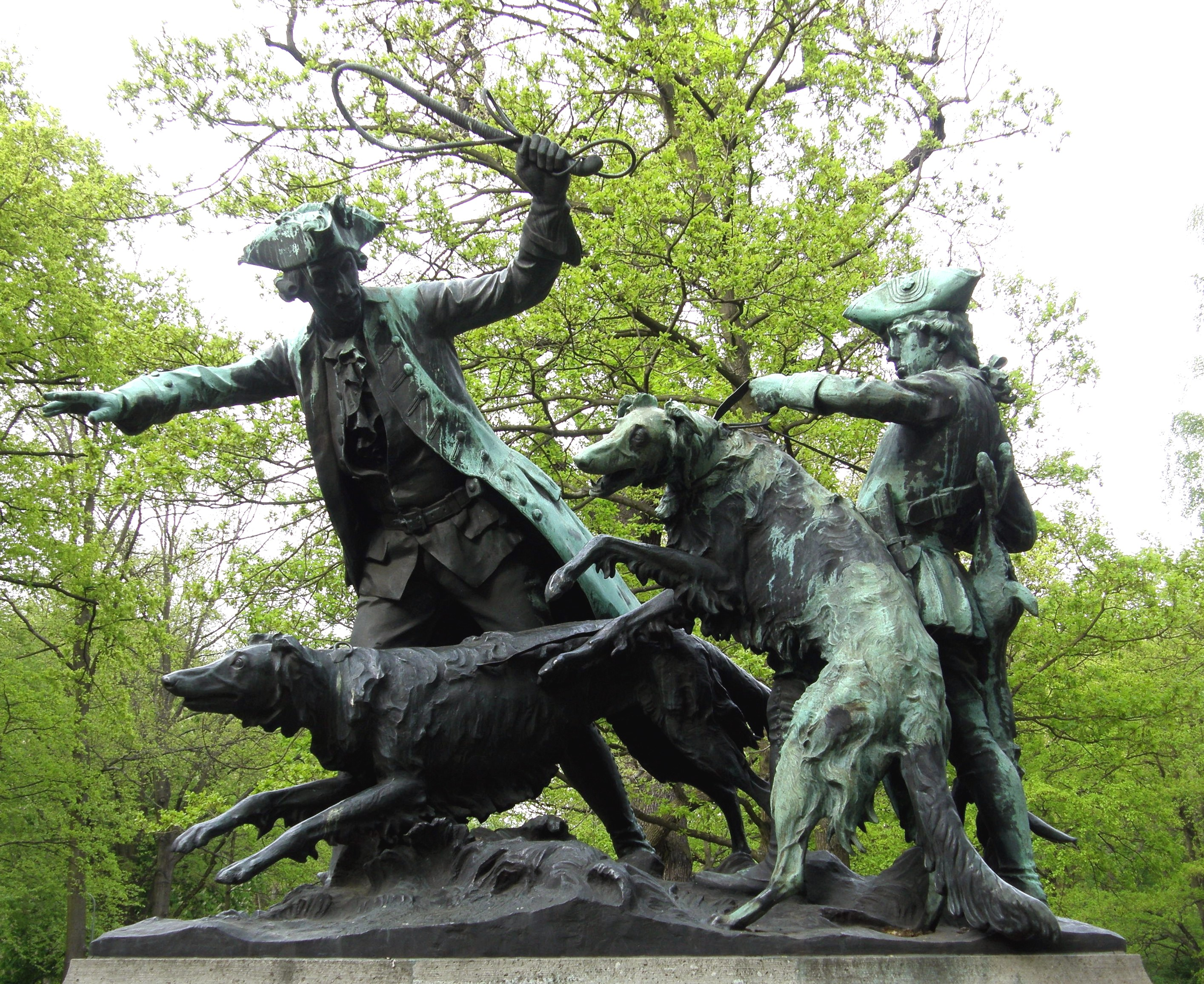
- The sculpture in 2010
- Artist: Max Baumbach
- Location: Berlin, Germany; 52°30′41″N 13°20′47″E

Hasenhatz zur Rokokozeit, or Hasenhatz der Rokokozeit, is an outdoor sculpture by Max Baumbach, installed at Fasanerieallee in the Tiergarten, Berlin, Germany.
