= Sassenberg =

- Town
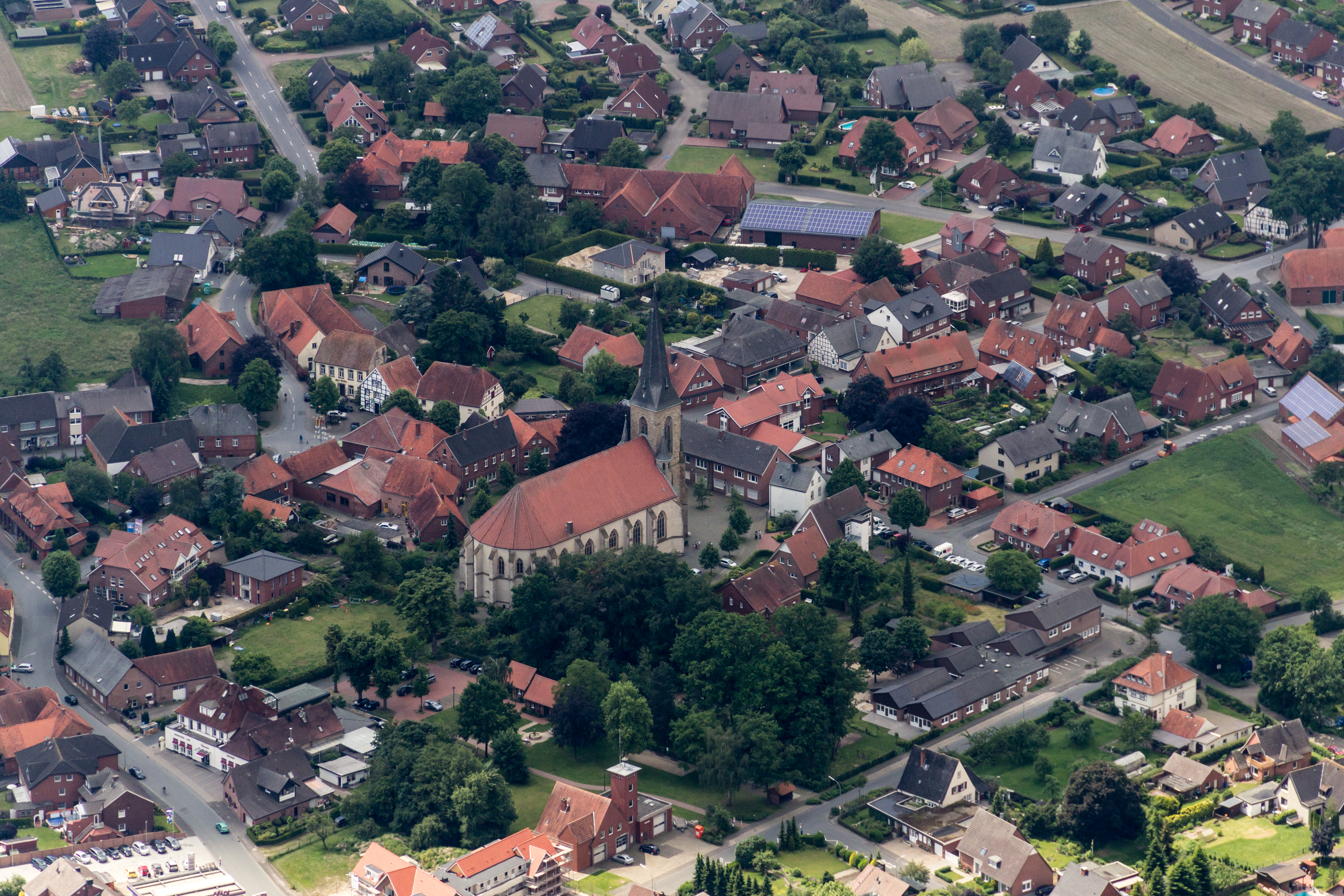
- Sassenberg-Füchtorf

- Coat of arms

- Location of Sassenberg within Warendorf district
- Interactive map of Sassenberg
- Location within Germany Location within North Rhine-Westphalia
- Coordinates: 51°59′23″N 8°02′27″E
- Country: Germany
- State: North Rhine-Westphalia
- Admin. region: Münster
- District: Warendorf

Government
  - Mayor (2020–25): Josef Uphoff (CDU)

Area
  - Total: 78.08 km^{2} (30.15 sq mi)
- Elevation: 60 m (200 ft)

Population (2025-12-31)
  - Total: 14,505
  - Density: 185.8/km^{2} (481.1/sq mi)
- Time zone: UTC+01:00 (CET)
  - Summer (DST): UTC+02:00 (CEST)
- Postal codes: 48336
- Dialling codes: 02583 (Sassenberg); 05426 (Füchtorf)
- Vehicle registration: WAF, BE
- Website: www.sassenberg.de

Sassenberg (German pronunciation: [ˈzasn̩bɛʁk]; Low German: Sassenbiärg) is a town in the district of Warendorf, in North Rhine-Westphalia, Germany. It is situated approximately 6 km north-east of Warendorf and 30 km east of Münster.

== Geography ==
=== Location ===
The city of Sassenberg is located on the Hessel, about 6 km northeast of the district town of Warendorf. The B 475, B 476, and B 513 federal highways intersect in the city. Sassenberg has had its present boundaries since the municipal reorganization of 1969.

=== Subdivisions ===
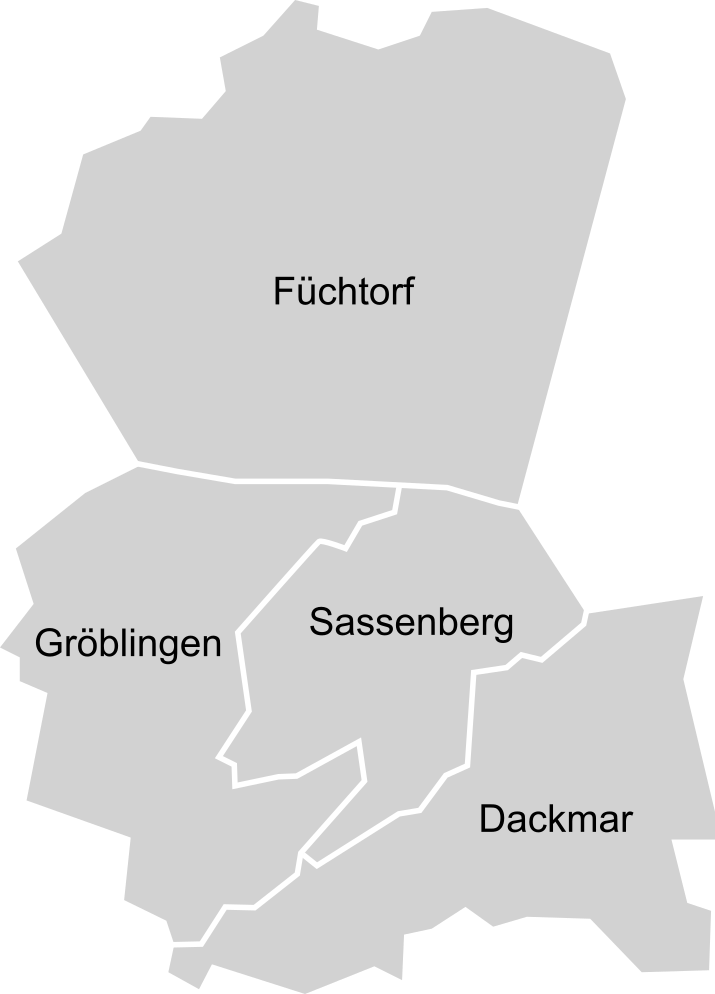
Districts of Sassenberg

Sassenberg consists of the main town of Sassenberg and the districts of Füchtorf, Dackmar, and Gröblingen.

=== Surface waters, bogs, and other wetlands ===
The area of Sassenberg is part of the Ems river basin. The main surface waters are the Hessel, the Bever, and the Ems. The Hessel and Bever are tributaries of the Ems. The Hessel flows through the main town, while the Bever passes through the southern part of the city. The Ems runs along the southern and eastern boundaries of the city, where it forms part of the Ems floodplain landscape.

There are also several lakes and ponds, including the Feldmark Lakes, which were created from former gravel extraction sites. Several bogs and wetlands are located within the city, particularly in the river lowlands. Important wetland areas include parts of the Ems floodplain, with wet meadows, former river channels, and remnants of wet woodland, as well as smaller bog and marsh areas around Feldmark.

The following nature reserves are located within the city: Füchtorfer Moor (WAF 007), Tiergarten und Schachblumenwiese (WAF 019), and parts of the Emsaue nature reserve (WAF 048) along the Ems south of the main town. The protected areas mainly consist of bogs, wet meadows, and floodplain landscapes with remnants of wet woodland. They provide habitats for rare plant and animal species.

== History ==
On July 1, 1969 the municipalities Dackmar, Füchtorf and Gröblingen were incorporated.

== Population ==
Historical population

Year	Pop.	±% p.a.
1965	7,821	—
1970	8,350	+1.32%
1975	8,665	+0.74%
1980	9,073	+0.92%
1985	9,314	+0.53%
1990	10,214	+1.86%
1995	12,057	+3.37%

Year	Pop.	±% p.a.
2000	13,443	+2.20%
2005	14,430	+1.43%
2010	14,240	−0.26%
2015	14,403	+0.23%
2020	14,215	−0.26%
2025	14,505	+0.40%

Source: Landesdatabank Nordrhein-Westfalen

== Notable people ==
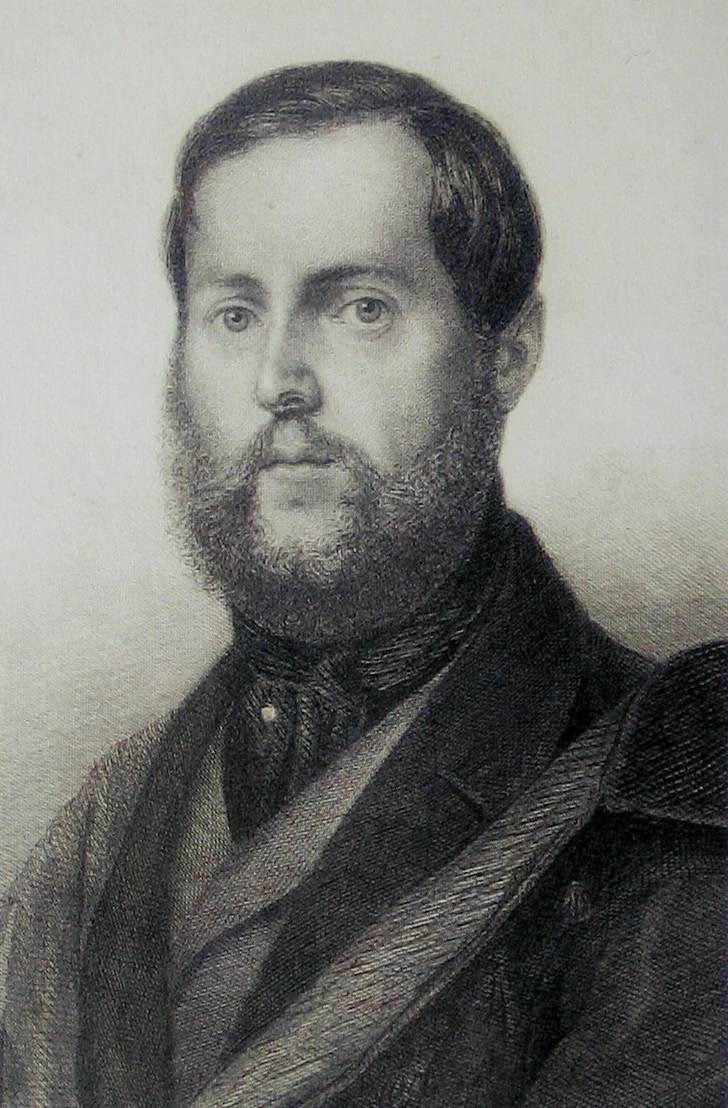
Levin Schücking

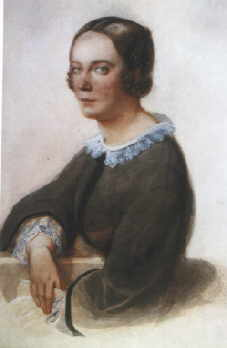
Louise von Gall

- Hermann von dem Busche (1468–1534), Humanist
- Levin Schücking (1814–1883), German writer, close confidant and editor of Annette von Droste-Hülshoff; married to Louise von Gall (novelist)
- Louise von Gall (1815–1855), novelist
- Joseph Uphues (1850–1911), sculptor
- Luigi Colani (1928–2019), designer
- Monica Theodorescu (born 1963), dressage rider

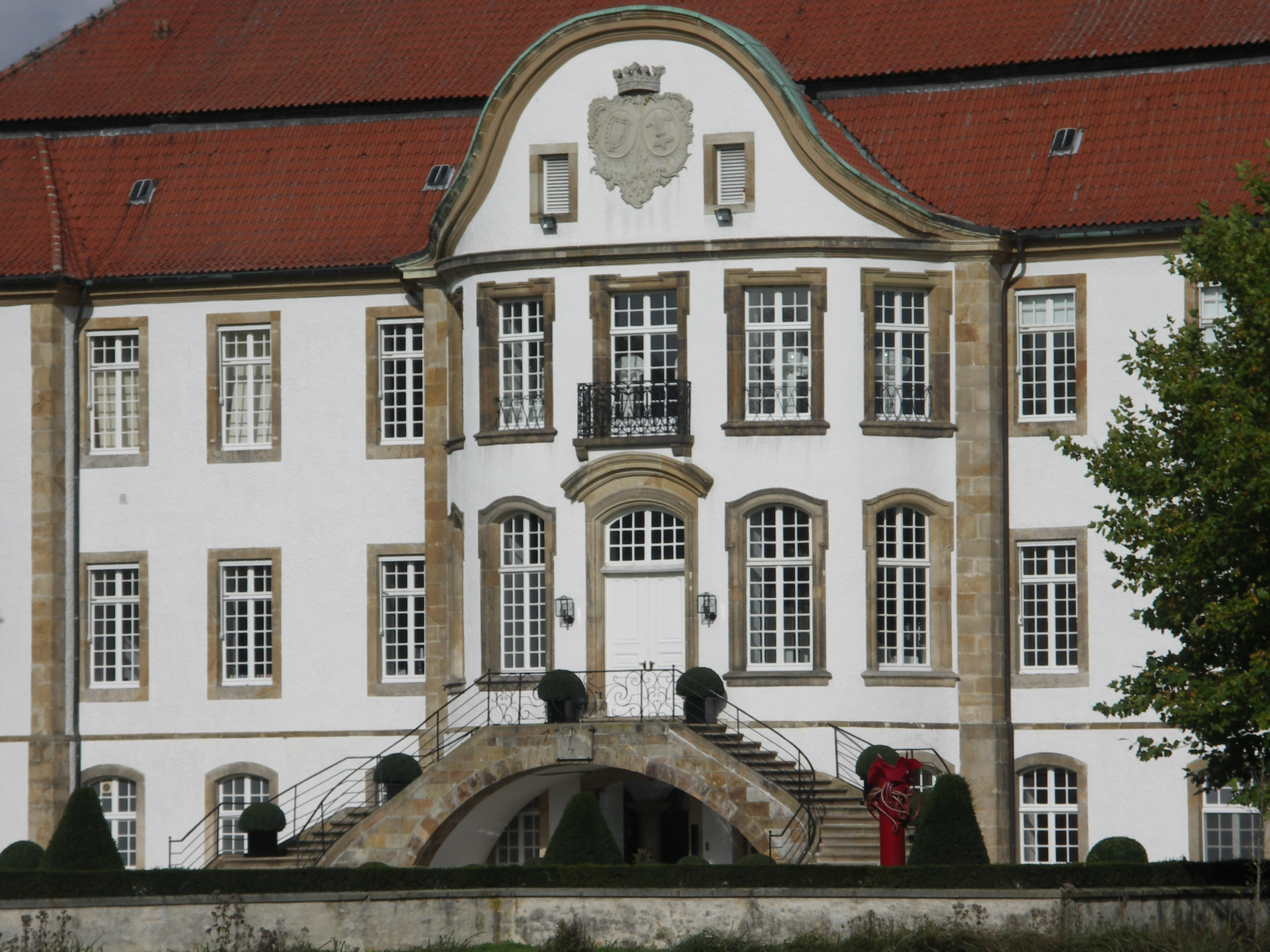
Harkotten Castle
