= Jaro von Tucholka =

German photographer and translator

- Born: Jarosława Melanie von Tucholka; 19 January 1894; Poznań
- Died: 2 July 1978 (aged 84); Munich
- Known for: photography, translation, painting
- Spouse: Friedrich Weigelt

Jaro von Tucholka (born 19 January 1894 in Poznań; died 2 July 1978 in Munich), from the Tucholka family, was a portrait photographer, translator and painter. She photographed celebrities, including Renée Sintenis, Arnolt Bronnen and Marieluise Fleißer, especially during the 1920s and 1930s.

== Early life and education ==
Jarosława Melanie von Tucholka was born in Poznań into a Catholic noble family who spoke both Polish and German in daily life. While young, Jarosława finished a private painting study in Dresden, and then moved to Vienna to study photography, specializing in portraiture.

== Career ==
Jarosława Melanie von Tucholka moved to Berlin in 1914, becoming a professional photographers there; Berlin's museum administration hired her to photograph Belgian art pieces. During World War I, she also worked as a translator at a Polish diplomacy office in Berlin.

In the 1920s, von Tucholka opened a photography studio at Charlottenburg, at Berliner Straße 147, now Otto-Suhr-Allee. She also entered the (frequently queer) artistic boheme of Weimar Berlin. The same decade, she started to sign her works as "Jaro von Tucholka", signifying her new, androgynous and gender-fluid persona. von Tucholka photographed celebrities such as Albert Einstein, Louis Ferdinand, Prince of Prussia, Max Liebermann, Agnes Straub and clairvoyant Madame Sylvia (countess Bianca von Beck-Rzikowsky). Her photographs were published in daily newspapers such as Tempo and lifestyle magazines such as Der Querschnitt and UHU. She also supposedly worked with Polish publications but the titles are unknown. A book of photographs by Tucholka on the theme of "Hands" was published in 1929. In late 1920, she created a photograhic series called Tod (Death), in which Valeska Gert stands in front of the camera. Tucholka also portrayed other (later persecuted by Nazis) Weimar artists: Ricarda Huch, Carl Zuckmayer, Marieluise Fleißer, and Renée Sintenis.

In 1931, Jaro von Tucholka entered a lavender marriage with the gay educator and politician Friedrich Weigelt, who was a friend of Adolf Brand, and soon Jaro photographed Brand and advertised her studio in his gay magazine, Der Eigene. The names of Jaro's female partners are unknown, but she was close with Leopoldine Konstantin and Lieselotte Friedlaender.

In 1933, the Nierendorf Gallery presented her exhibition Kopf, Hand und Schrift schöpferischer Persönlichkeiten (Head, Hand and Writing of Creative Personalities). After the rise of Nazis to power, her photographs of controversial subjects were banned from the gallery, and she was frequently questioned because of her contacts in Poland. In 1933, Friedrich was banned from his job and Jaro closed her photography studio. In 1933 or 1934, Jaro von Tucholka passed a translator exam and founded a translation agency. Friedrich Weigelt worked there and also worked as a film extra; among others, he doubled for Harry Piel. Weigelt also wrote pro-government articles for provincial newspapers and for Berliner Rundfunk. Since 1939, Weigelt also had connections to the Red Orchestra, but stopped associating with them before the group were unmasked in 1942. Around 1943, according to Bernd-Ulrich Hergemöller, the couple decided to go into hiding; according to Karl-Heinz Steinle, bomb damage destroyed the couple's apartment at Fasanenstraße 67 and left the residents homeless.

While Friedrich Weigelt and his male partner found refuge with Richard Schultz in Berlin, Jaro von Tucholka, possibly with a female partner, fled to Vienna to work as a translator. After the war, Jaro von Tucholka and Friedrich Weigelt resumed public appearances together, and initially lived in Berlin again. Jaro resumed her photograph work, portraying Klaus Kinski for theater bills, and working with the photographer Lore Feininger. Following Weigelt's retirement in 1962, they moved from walled West Berlin to Munich, where Jaro opened a translation studio, translated plays by Andrzej Wydrzyński and devoted herself to painting.

== Death and legacy ==
Friedrich Weigelt outlived his wife. His estate is held by Berlin-Neukölln Local History Museum.

== Publications ==
- Rolf Voigt, Hände. Eine Sammlung von Handabbildungen großer Toter und Lebender. Mit einer Einführung in die Handkunde von Rolf Voigt und einem kunsthistorischen Geleitwort von Kurt Pfister, Hamburg (Gebrüder Enoch) 1929
