= Karl Begas =

German sculptor (1845–1916)

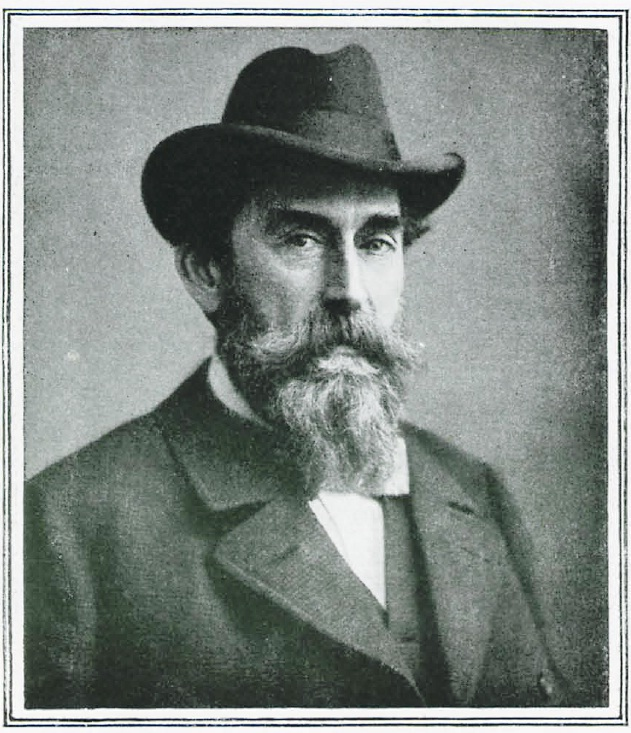
Karl Begas (1904)

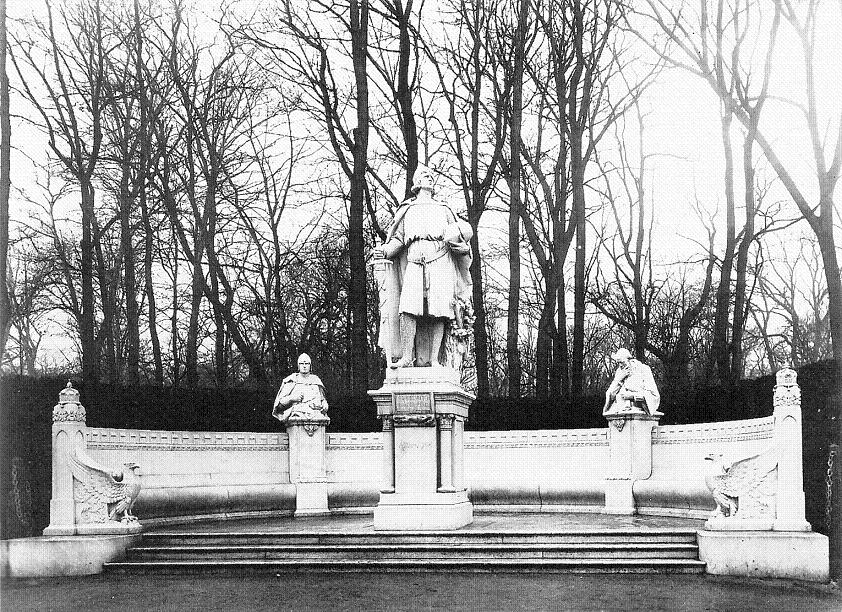
Siegesallee Group 7 (c.1900). Statue of Otto IV, flanked by Johann von Buch (right) and Johann von Kröcher

Karl Begas (23 November 1845 in Berlin – 21 February 1916 in Köthen) was a German sculptor. To distinguish him from his father, he is often referred to as "the younger".

== Life ==
His father was the history painter Carl Joseph Begas and he began his studies with his elder brother, Reinhold, a well-known sculptor. He later attended the Prussian Academy of Art, where he was a student of Louis Sussmann-Hellborn.

In 1869 and 1870, he took a study trip to Rome, where he completed several portrait busts. After three years back home in Berlin, he returned to Italy, where he lived for five years. In 1880, he made a bust of the Kaiser for the New Gallery in Kassel. Two years later, he turned to producing larger figures; two for the University of Kiel and two for the Kassel City Hall. In 1889, he became a professor at the Kunsthochschule Kassel, but stayed for only a short time before leaving to take on more public commissions.

From 1904 to 1906, he created a marble statue of Empress Augusta Victoria, which was the first to be placed in the Rose Garden at the new palace in Sanssouci. After the monarchy was abolished, the statue was moved to the New Palace. For the Siegesallee project he created two groups. Group 7 (1899) contained a statue of Otto IV, Margrave of Brandenburg-Stendal (nicknamed "Otto with the Arrow"), with busts of Johann von Kröcher (an advisor to the Margrave) and Johann von Buch (Glossator of Sachsenspiegel). In Group 31 (1900), the statue was Frederick William IV of Prussia; the busts were Alexander von Humboldt and Christian Daniel Rauch. Most of the statues in the Siegesallee were heavily damaged in World War II. Many have undergone restoration at the Spandau Citadel. The head of Begas' Otto IV is in a private collection.

== Works ==
- Eberjagd um 1500
