= Fritz Schaper =

German sculptor (1841–1919)

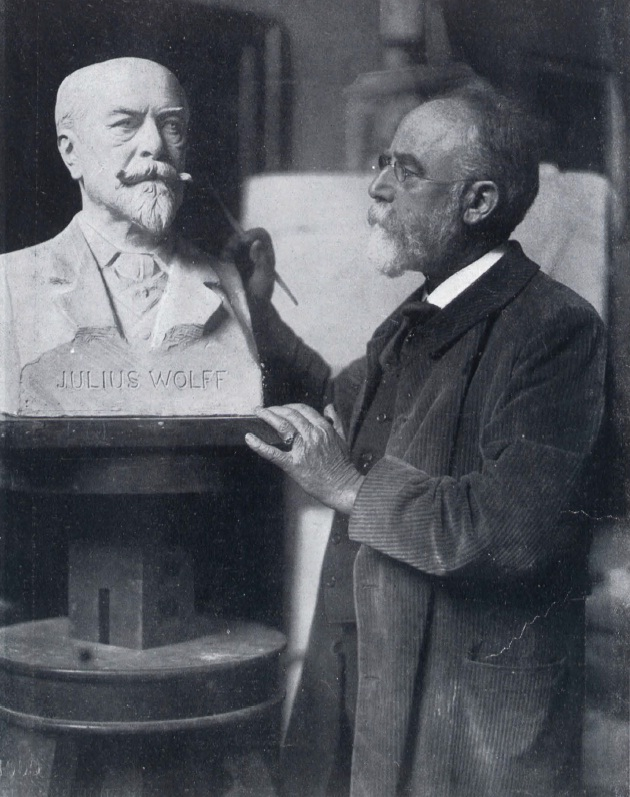
Schaper in his studio (1909)

Fritz (Friedrich) Schaper (31 July 1841, Alsleben – 29 November 1919, Berlin) was a German sculptor.

== Life ==
He was orphaned at an early age, and was sent to Halle to receive instruction at the Francke Foundations. After being apprenticed as a stonemason, he went to Berlin in 1859 for further training at the Prussian Academy of Arts. Afterwards, he became an employee at the workshop of Albert Wolff until establishing his own studios in 1867. He was a professor at the Prussian Academy from 1875 to 1890 and also served as manager of the "Aktsaal" (nude modelling studio). Max Baumbach, Adolf Brütt, Reinhold Felderhoff, Fritz Klimsch, Ludwig Manzel, Max Unger, Joseph Uphues and Wilhelm Wandschneider were among his many well-known students.

He became a full member of the Academy in 1880 and a member of the governing Senate in 1881. He was also an honorary member of the academies in Munich and Dresden. In 1914, he was one of the signatories to the Manifesto of the Ninety-Three, a document supporting Germany's invasion of Belgium.

== Other notable works ==
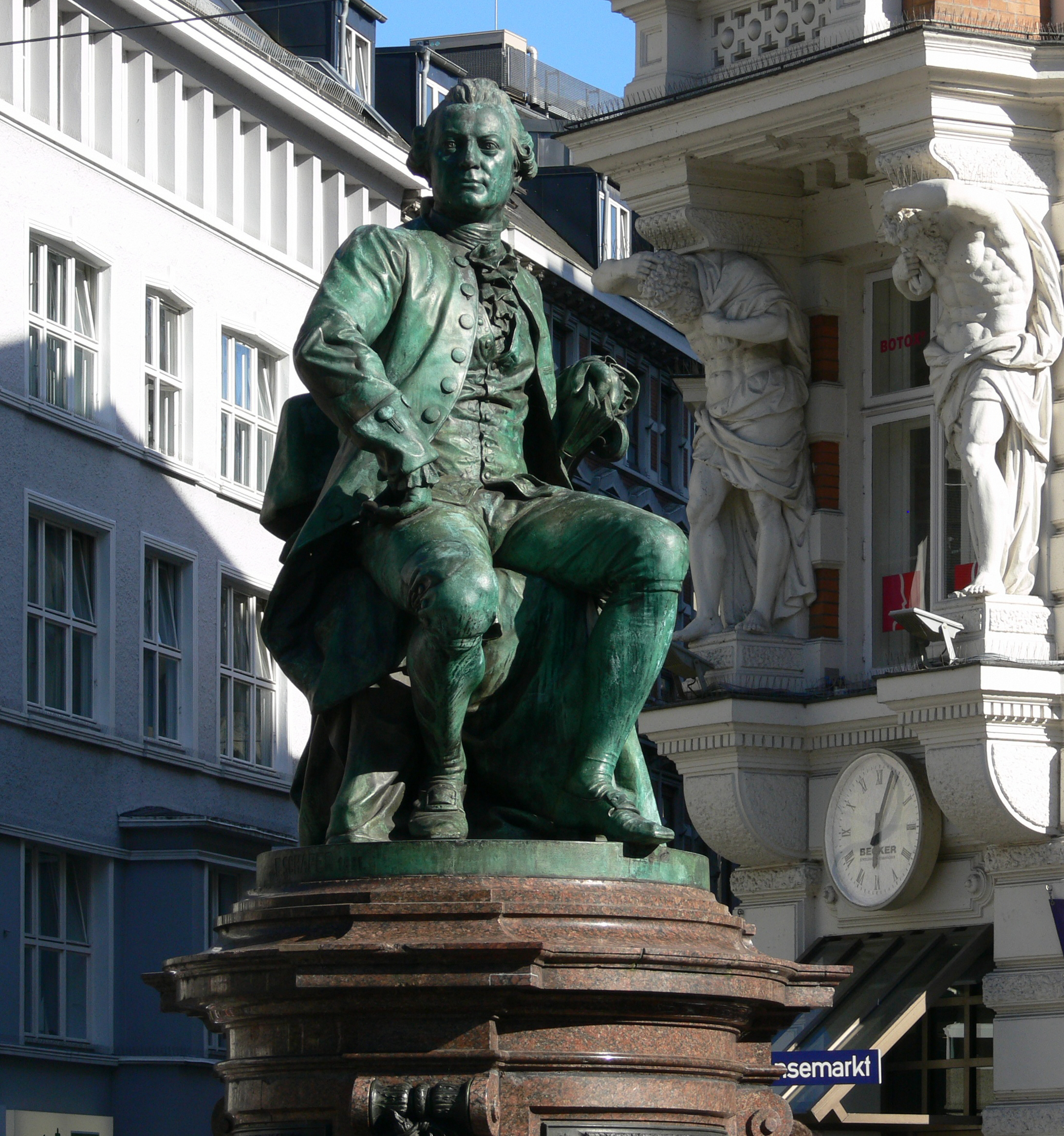
Gotthold Lessing Monument, Gänsemarkt, Hamburg

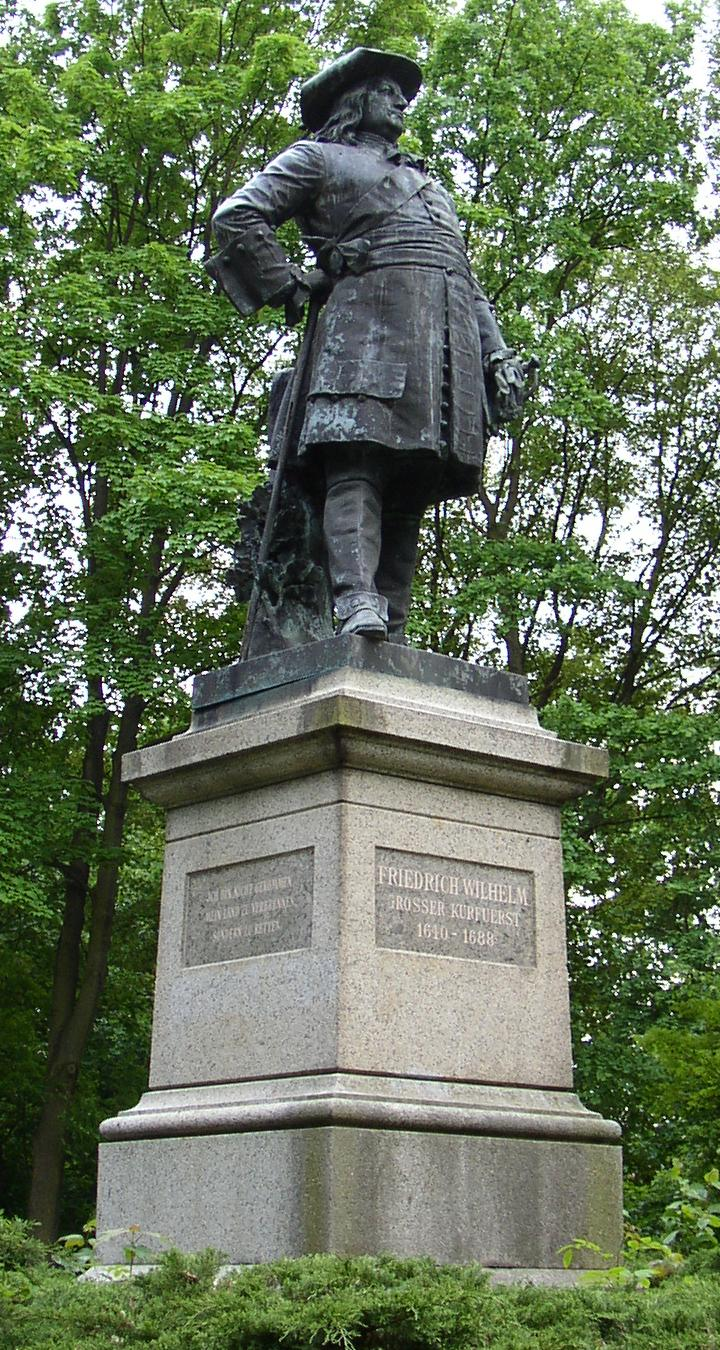
Frederick William, Elector of Brandenburg, Fehrbellin

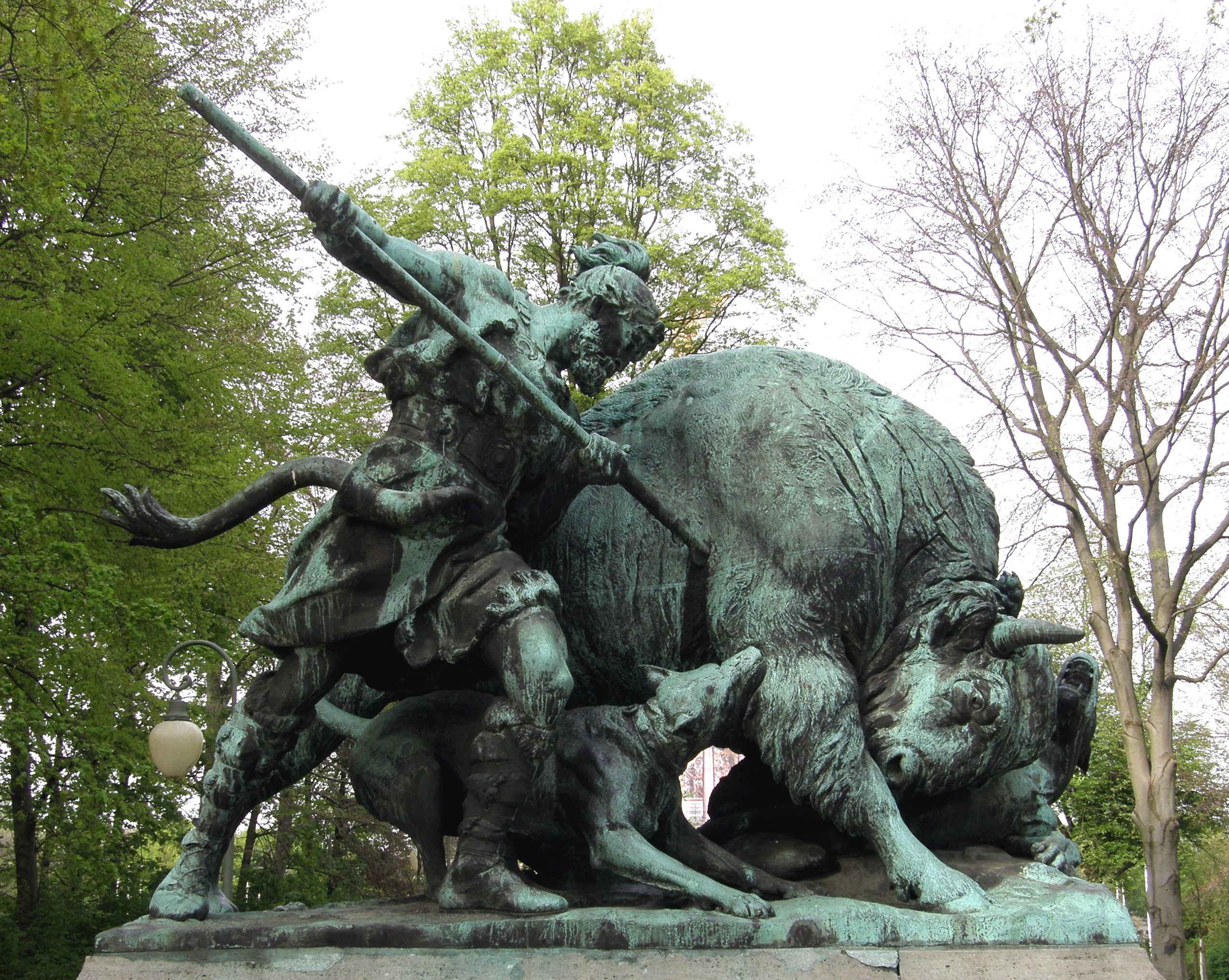
Altgermanische Wisentjagd (bison hunting), Berlin

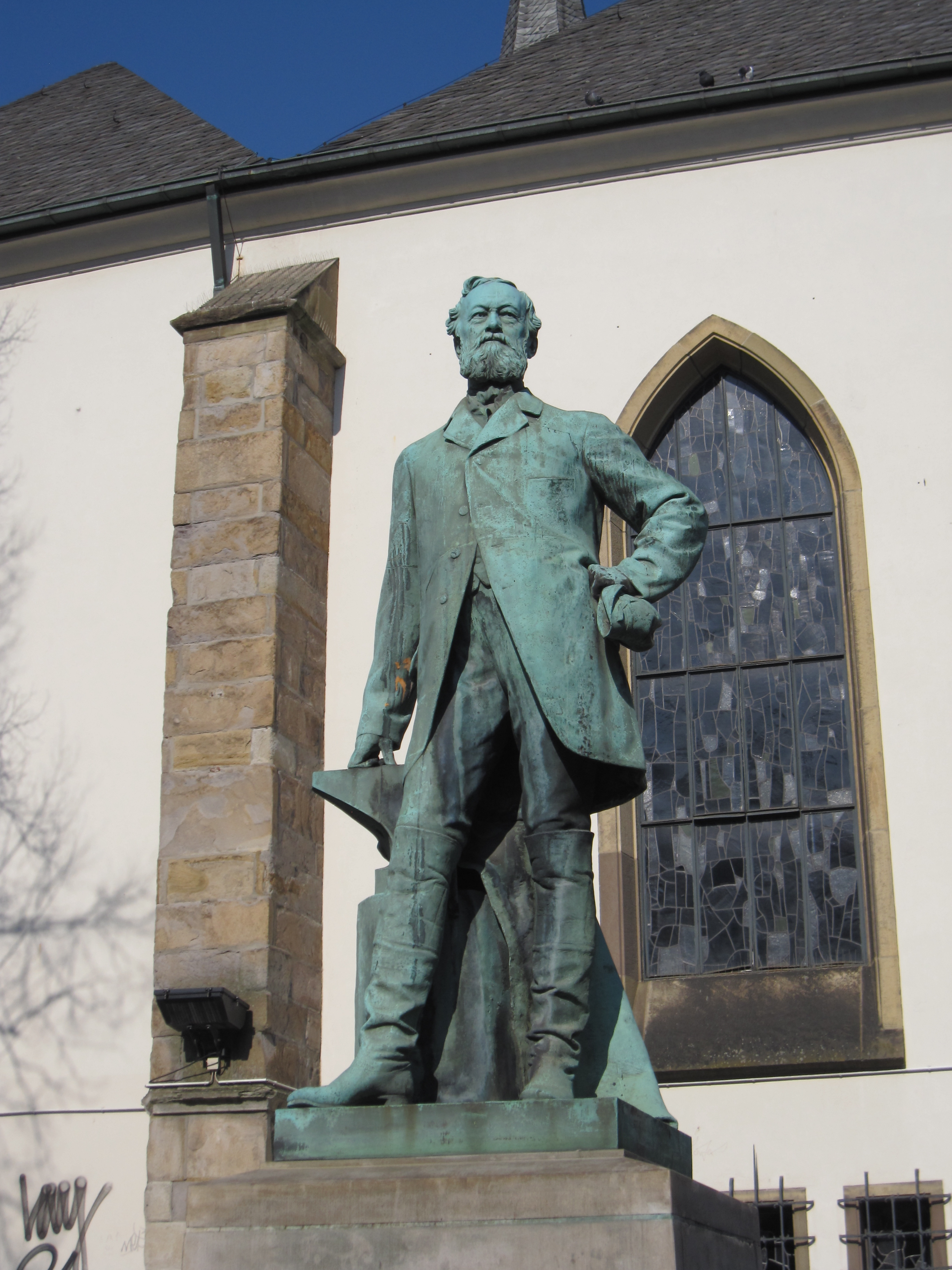
Alfred Krupp Monument, Essen

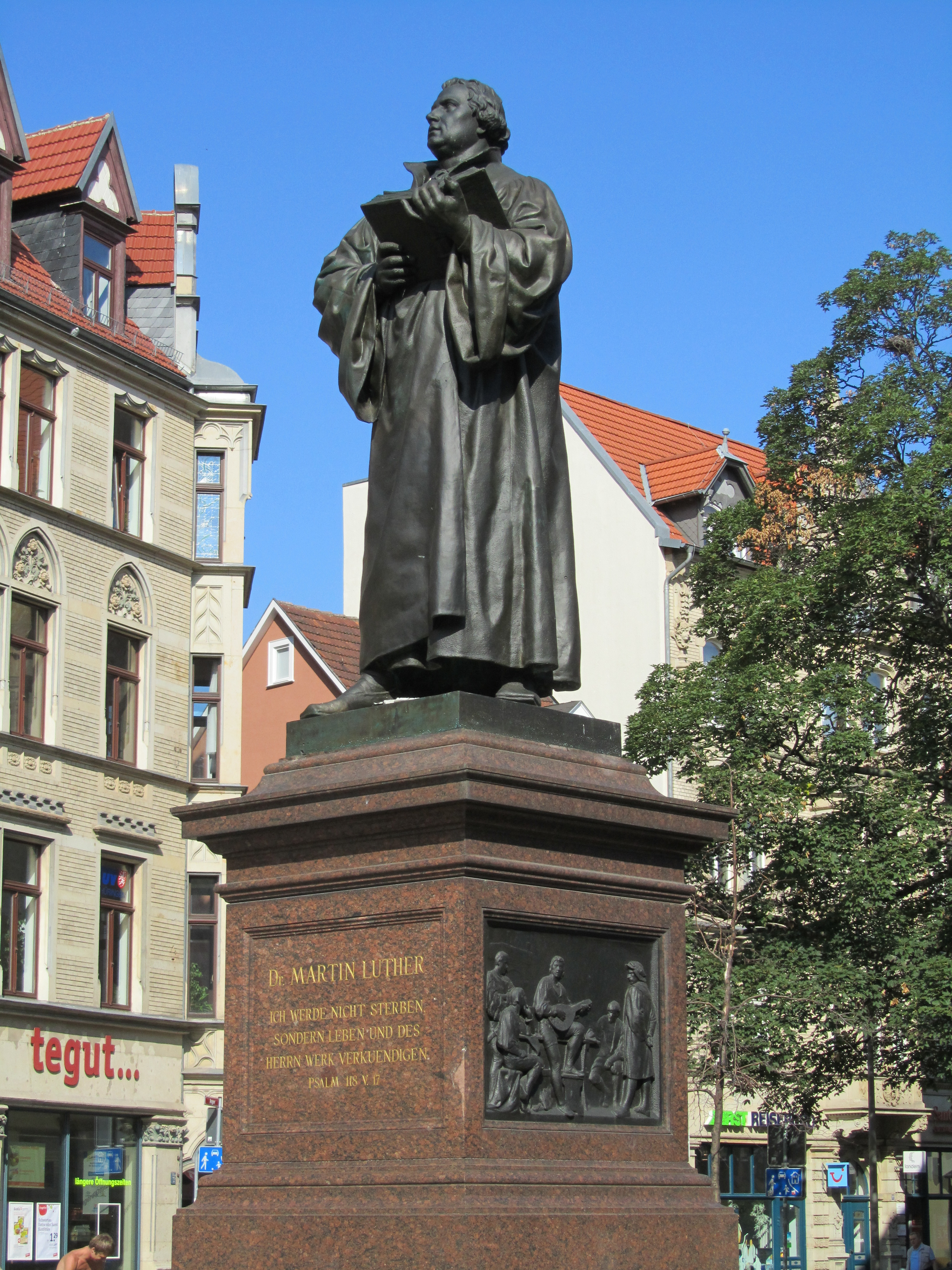
Luther Monument, Erfurt

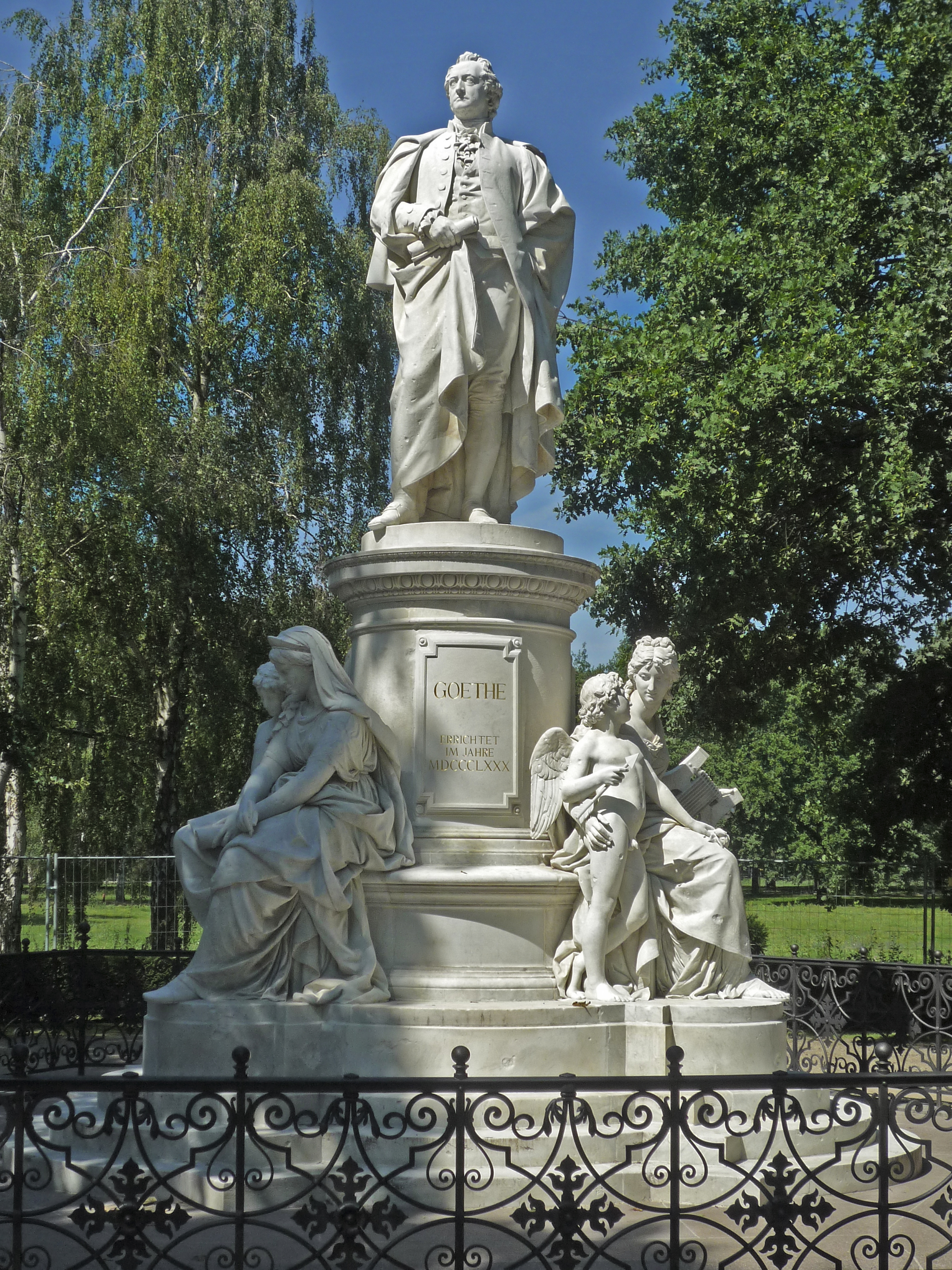
Goethe Monument in the Berliner Tiergarten (1880), his best
known work
