= Hans Everding =

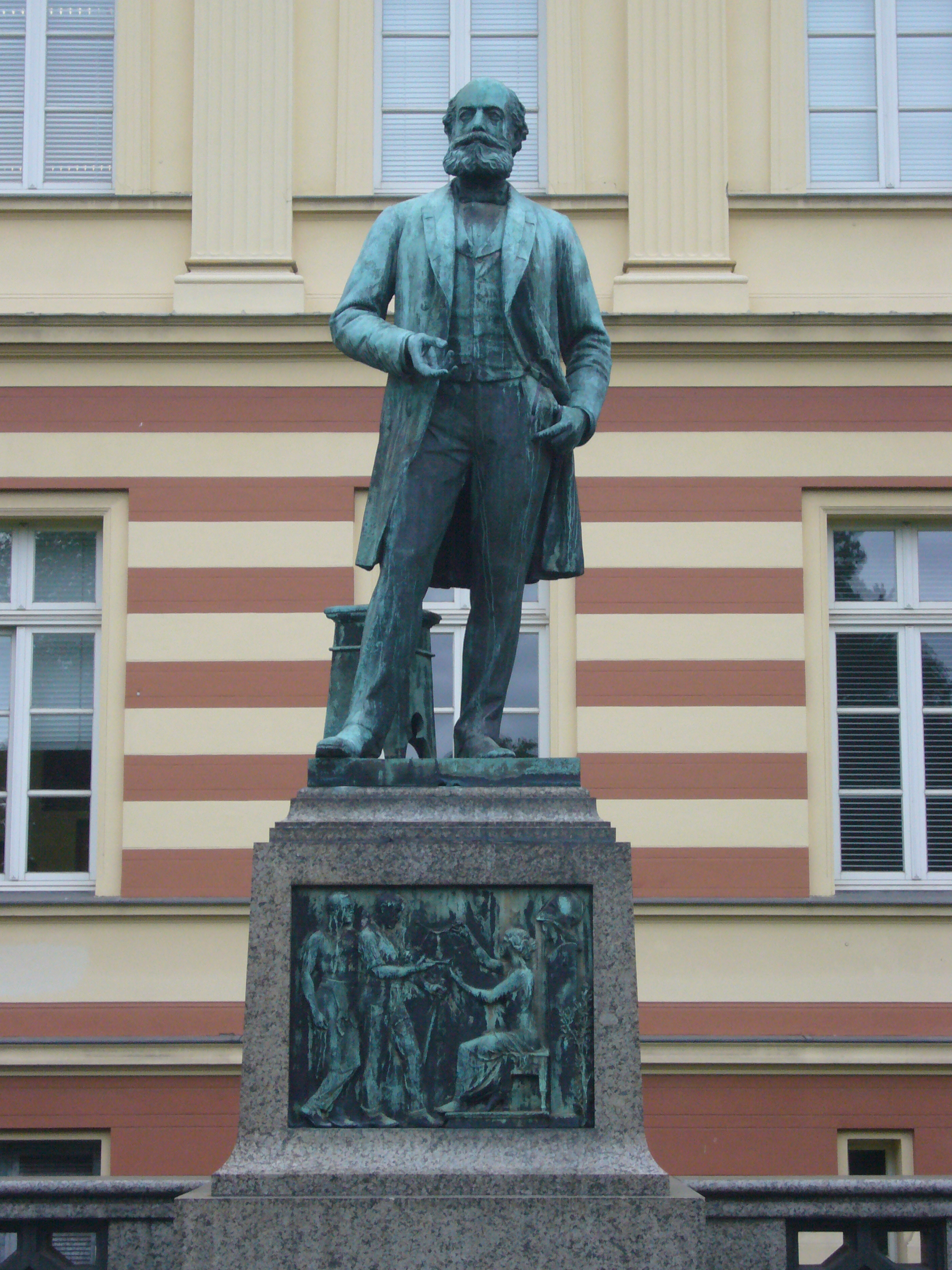
The Kekulé Monument, Bonn

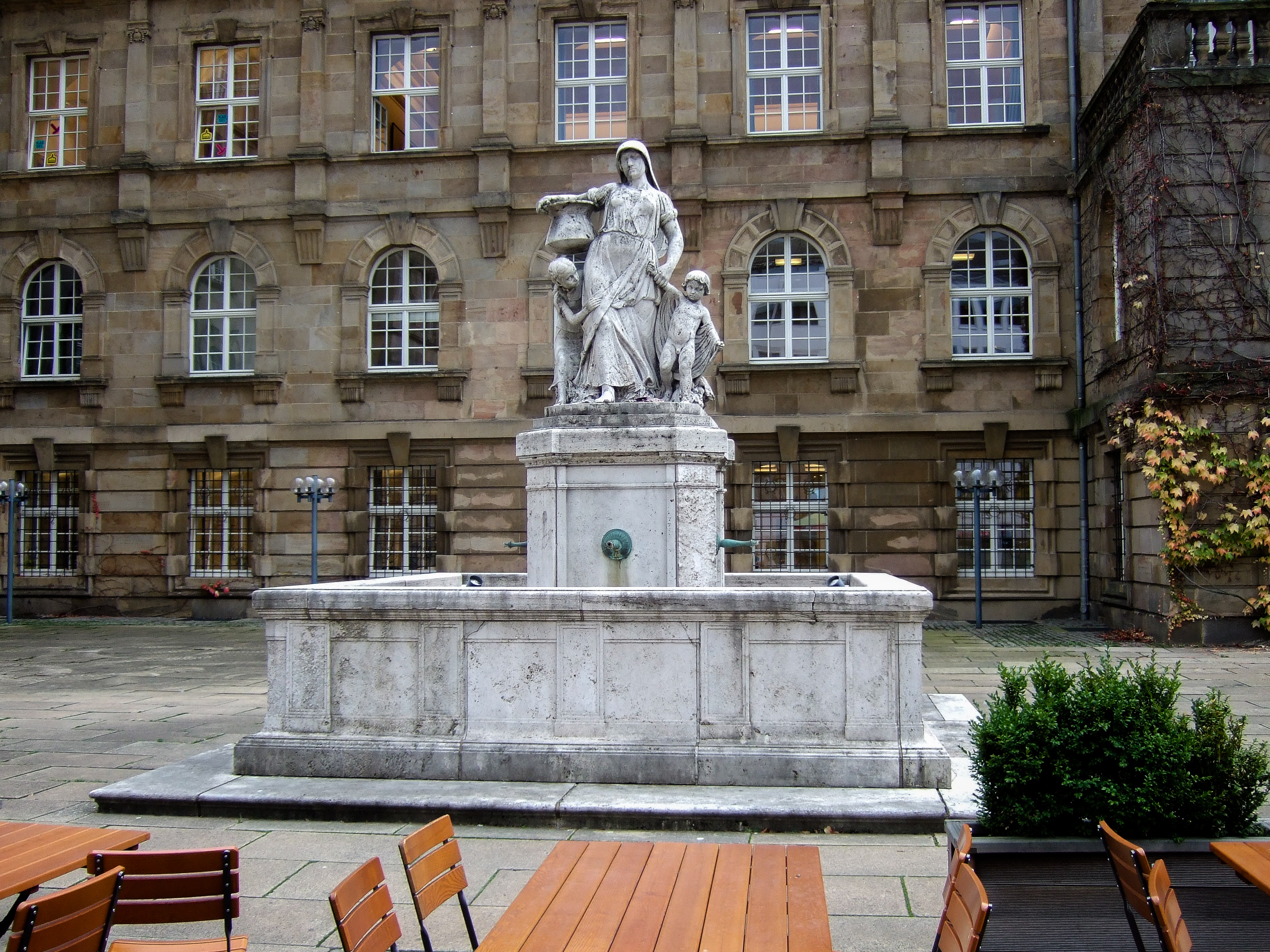
The Sophie Henschel Fountain, Kassel

Johannes Everding (17 October 1876 in Gelsenkirchen – 13 December 1914 in Kassel) was a German sculptor and medallist, primarily known for monuments and fountains.

== Life and work ==
His father, Dr. Friedrich Wilhelm Hermann Everding (1824–1880) was a general practitioner. His mother, Ella née Müldner (1854–1951), was a meat inspector. After graduating from the Friedrichsgymnasium Kassel, he attended the Kunsthochschule Kassel, where he studied with the sculptor, Karl Begas.

In 1898, he was awarded a small gold medal at the Große Berliner Kunstausstellung. The following year, he was presented with the Großen Staatspreis from the Prussian Academy of Arts. This award included an extensive study trip through Italy, and a stay at the Villa Strohl Fern from 1900 to 1901. He remained in Rome until 1902, when he was said to have been chosen to carry out the construction of a monument to Empress Victoria at the Siegesallee. The commission went to Fritz Gerth instead. Later that year, he returned to Kassel to marry Marie le Noir (1877–1918). They would have one daughter, Marianne, born 1912, died 1990.

In 1910, the Accademia di San Luca in Rome awarded him their Müllerpreis. He died in Kassel four years later, at the age of thirty-eight, in the presence of a friend. The cause of death was apparently not recorded.

His best known sculptures include monuments to August Kekulé (Bonn) and Philip I, Landgrave of Hesse (Kassel), as well as smaller works, such as the herms of Goethe and Schiller at the Staatstheater Kassel.
