= Busso VII von Alvensleben =

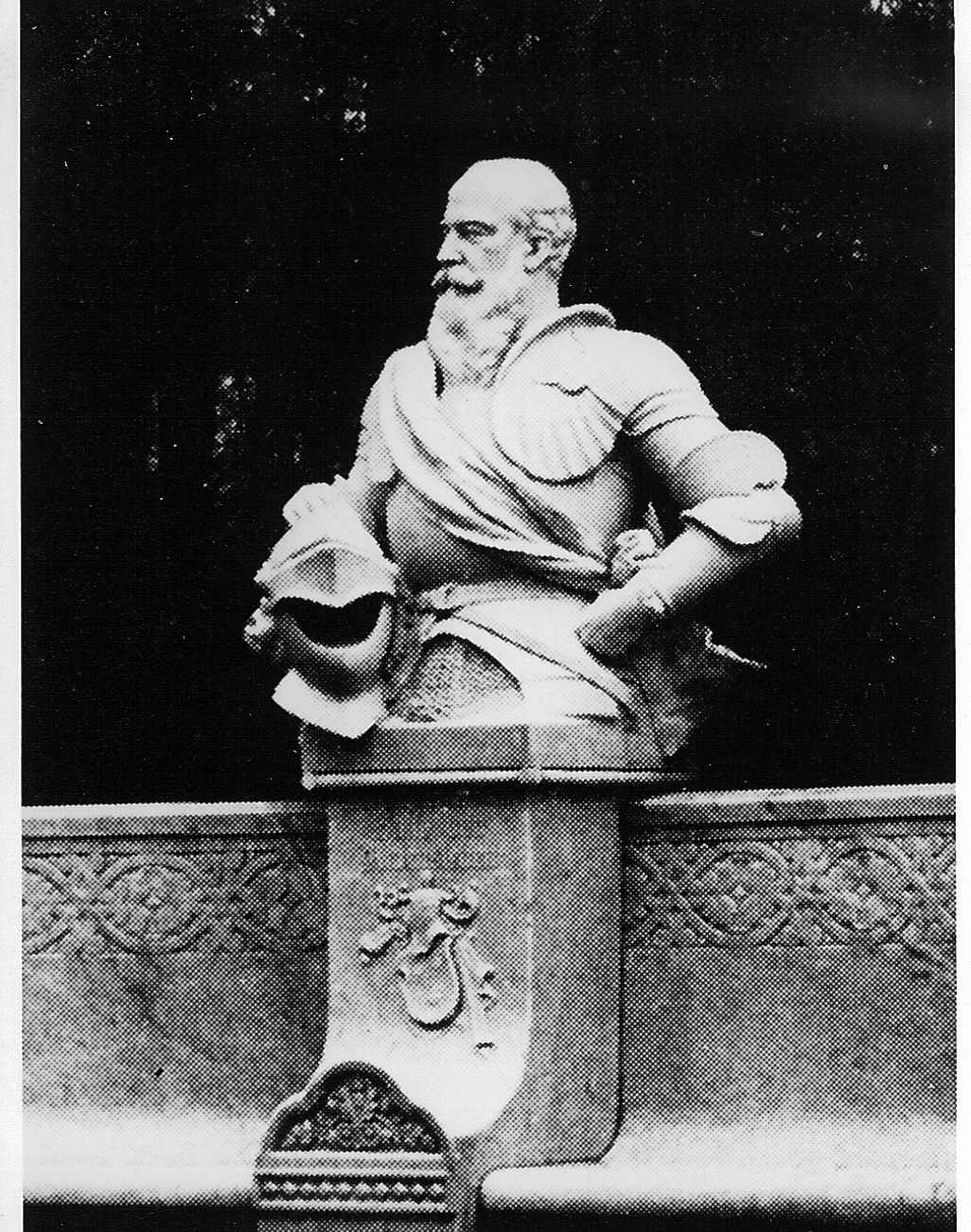
Busso VII;, monument on the Siegesallee by Albert Manthe

Busso VII von Alvensleben (fl. 1441–1495) was the Burgherr (Lord) of Kalbe, Chief Marshall and Stadtholder of Mark Brandenburg, and Landeshauptmann of Altmark.

== Biography ==
He came from the "Low German" House of Alvensleben, and was the second son of Ludolf II von Alvensleben, from Kalbe. In 1443, together with his older brother, Ludolf IV (fl. 1441–1476), he was accepted into the Order of the Swan by Frederick II, Elector of Brandenburg. In 1464, he obtained the dignity of a Knight and became the Chief Marshall (Obermarschall).

In 1470, following the abdication of Frederick II, he served as Stadtholder until the new Elector, Albrecht Achilles, who lived at Plassenburg in Kulmbach, was able to come to Brandenburg to take office. The following year, he became a Hauptmann in Altmark.

In 1476, he served as a Field Captain in the "Glogau-Crossen’schen War", a dispute with the Duchy of Glogau over their line of succession when the Piast Dynasty became extinct. Three years later, as a reward, he and his family were presented with the enfeoffment of the lands around Burg Kalbe, which was made hereditary.

He was married to Metta von Alten. They had two sons and two daughters.

In November 1900 he was given a large bust, next to the statue of Johann Cicero, in Group 18 at the Siegesallee. It was sculpted by Albert Manthe, based on the combined facial features of three other members of the Alvensleben family.
