= Hermann Paucksch =

German mechanical engineering contractor and manufacturer (born 1816)

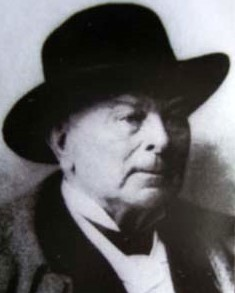
- Born: Hermann Johann Gottlieb Paucksch; 13 April 1816; Landsberg an der Warthe
- Died: 5 March 1899 (aged 82)
- Occupation: Mechanical engineer

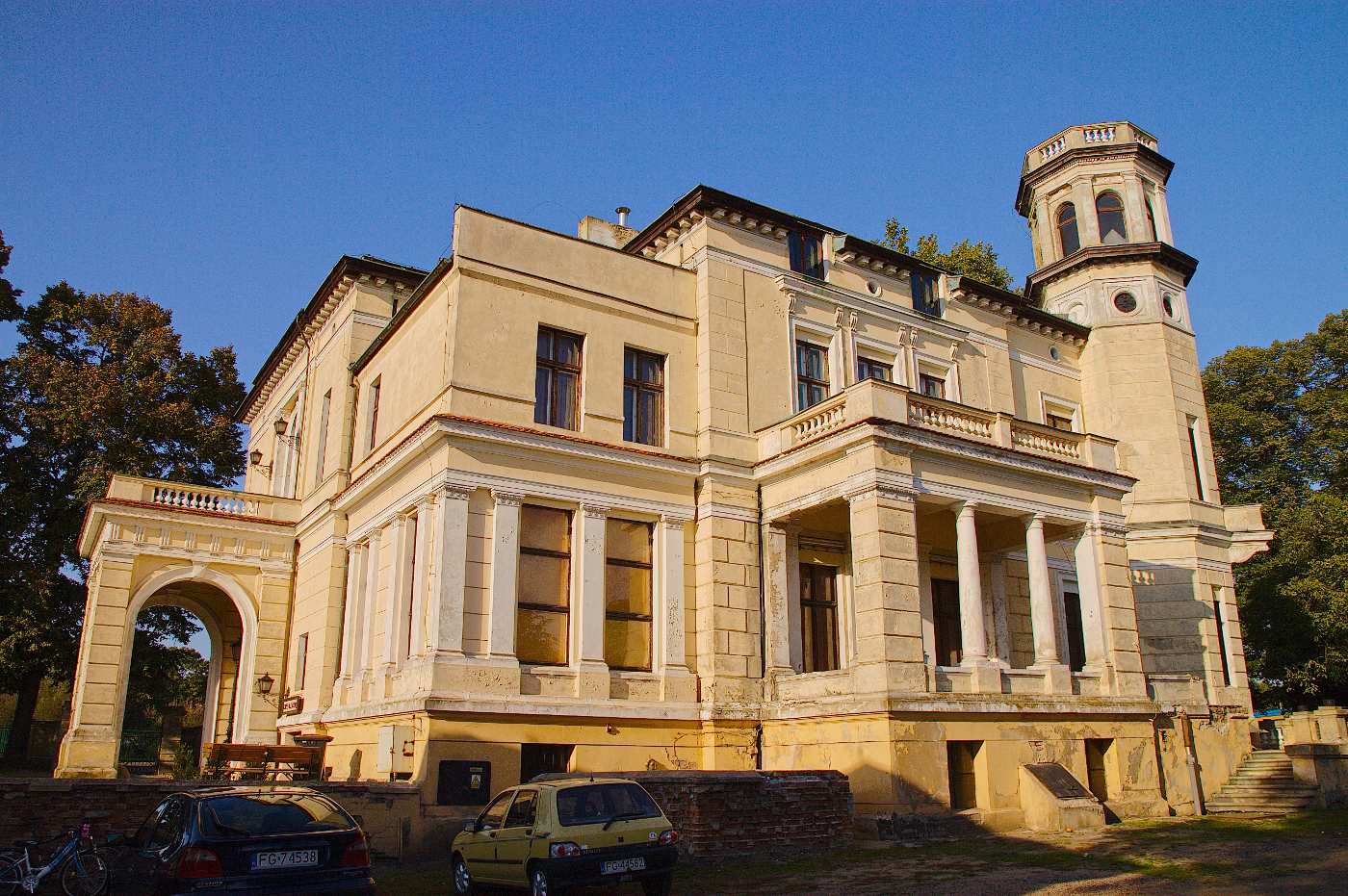
The Villa Paucksch

Hermann Johann Gottlieb Paucksch (13 April 1816, Landsberg an der Warthe - 5 March 1899, Landsberg an der Warthe) was a German mechanical engineering contractor and manufacturer.

== Biography ==
He was born to Johann Gottlieb Paucksch, a Master Turner, and his wife Dorothea, née Jabelt. As he grew up, he learned the trade of a brass worker. While still young, he married and had a large family. In 1843, he and his father started a mechanical engineering workshop. In 1863, he took a partner (Johann Heinrich Freund, otherwise unknown), becoming "Paucksch & Freund" and producing steam boilers.

In 1874, anticipating passage of the "Sozialgesetzgebung" (social legislation) proposed by Otto von Bismarck, he set up a pension and disability fund for his employees and provided it with an initial fund of 5,000 Thalers. Each employee then made an annual contribution of two Thalers. Three years later, he had a small castle built just outside Landsberg, known as the "Villa Paucksch". It later served briefly as a hospital, then was home to the "Grodzki House of Culture" until 2014. It has been named an "object of cultural heritage" by the Polish government.

In 1884, his eldest son became Technical Director. Four years later, the company was converted to a stock corporation. In 1893, there was a major fire at the factory and he retired, leaving the company's operation to his sons. At its height, it produced steam boilers, steam engines, ship steam engines, gas engines, diesel engines, turbines, transmissions, mash and water pumps, steam cutting mills, complete alcohol distilleries and drying systems.

He was a member of the Landsberg City Parliament, under the Prussian three-class franchise, and was made an honorary citizen. In 1896 he showed his gratitude to the city by donating a fountain, created by Cuno von Uechtritz-Steinkirch, one of the sculptors working on the Siegesallee who, in 1901, would also create a monument to Paucksch on the main city bridge. Both works were melted down for use as war materiel during World War II. In 1997, a replica of the fountain was created, with donations from former German residents. The recreation was carried out by the Polish sculptor, Zofia Bilińska.

== Sources ==
- Hermann Paucksch, biography @ Gorzów Wielkopolski
- H. Paucksch A.G., Maschinenbauanstalt, Eisengießerei und Dampfkesselfabrik, timeline by Albert Gieseler @ Kraft- und Dampfmaschinen
