= Götzen =

Götzen, a community of Schotten in Hesse, Germany, may refer to:

- Gustav Adolf von Götzen (1866–1910), German explorer and governor
- Johann von Götzen (1599–1645), Imperial Generalfeldmarschall during the Thirty Years' War
- Sigismund von Götzen (1576–1650), chancellor of the Margraviate of Brandenburg
- Lubbertus Götzen (1894–1979), Dutch accountant and politician
- Götzen-Dämmerung (The Twilight of the Idols), a book by Friedrich Nietzsche
- MV Liemba, a ship formerly known as Graf von Götzen
