= Adam, Count of Schwarzenberg =

German official (1583–1641)

Adam Graf von Schwarzenberg
- Count of Schwarzenberg
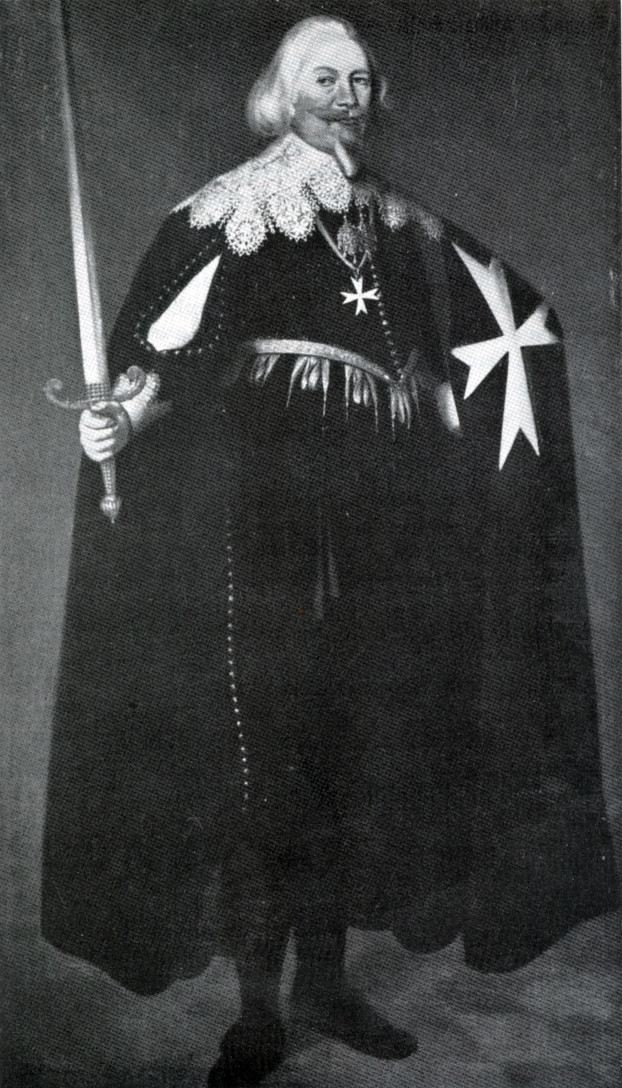
- Adam, Graf von Schwarzenberg, as a knight of the Order of Saint John: portrait from the private collection of Dr. Alexander Rothkop
- Son: Johann Adolf, Prince of Schwarzenberg
- Other titles: Governor of Brandenburg
- Born: 26 August 1583; Gimborn, County of Mark
- Died: 14 March 1641 (aged 57)
- Wife: Margaretha Freiin Hartard von Pallant
- Father: Adolf, Count of Schwarzenberg
- Mother: Margaretha Freiin Wolff von Metternich

Adam Graf von Schwar(t)zenberg (26 August 1583 – 14 March 1641) was a German official who advised George William, Elector of Brandenburg, during the Thirty Years' War and served as the Master of the Johanniterorden, the Bailiwick of Brandenburg of the Order of Saint John (1625−41).

== Early life ==
Schwarzenberg was born in Gimborn in the County of Mark. He was the son of Adolf, Count of Schwarzenberg, and a member of the House of Schwarzenberg from Franconian Seinsheim. The family was first documented in 1172 and elevated to the status of Reichsgraf in 1599. His mother was Margaretha Freiin Wolff von Metternich.

In 1600, Schwarzenberg inherited the title and lordship of his father, who died fighting the Ottoman Empire. In 1609, he supported Elector John Sigismund's claims to Jülich and Cleves.

Schwarzenberg married Margaretha Freiin Hartard von Pallant in 1613, but his wife died two years later while giving birth to his second son, Johann Adolf. Rather than remarrying, Schwarzenberg entered the Johanniterorden, becoming its Herrenmeister ("Lord of the Knights", or Grand Master) in 1625. He retained that office until his death, sixteen years later.

== Political career ==
=== Brandenburg Privy Council ===
In the following years, Schwarzenberg became a member of Brandenburg's Privy Council, where he quickly acquired a position of prominence, especially regarding Brandenburg-Prussia's Rhenish territories. He also used his stature in the Bergisches Land to secure the elevation of his Gimborn homeland to the reichsunmittelbar Lordship of Gimborn-Neustadt. Schwarzenberg reached the height of his power during the reign of Elector George William. Although the Margraviate of Brandenburg was predominantly Lutheran and its prince was Calvinist, the Roman Catholic Schwarzenburg advocated the imperial interests of Austria's Catholic Habsburg monarchy.

George William pursued a policy of neutrality for Brandenburg during the Thirty Years' War. Schwarzenberg's pro-imperial tendencies were opposed by the pro-Protestant faction led by the privy councilors Levin von Knesebeck and Samuel von Winterfeld, but supported by his protégé Joachim Friedrich von Blumenthal. Schwarzenberg succeeded in having Winterfeld expelled in 1626 when the imperial cause loomed strong. When Sweden became involved in the war, the Calvinist chancellor Sigismund von Götzen gained control and forced Schwarzenberg to retire to Kleve in 1630. When the imperial cause regained momentum in 1634−5, Schwarzenberg returned to Berlin. He appointed von Blumenthal to raise an army of 26,000 troops to expel the Swedes and enforce George William's claim on Pomerania, but he was only able to raise 11,000 undisciplined soldiers.

=== Ruler of Brandenburg ===
After George William fled to Königsberg in the Duchy of Prussia in 1638, Schwarzenberg became the virtual dictator of Brandenburg from 1638 to 1640. To finance the war, Schwarzenberg imposed new taxes, restricted the powers of the provincial estates, and suspended the Privy Council in favor of a War Council. Although Schwarzenberg had initially been supported by the estates for his cautious neutrality at the beginning of the war, the estates resented his attacks on their rights. He was seen as a traitor and agent for Austria and Habsburg Spain, profiting from the war while Brandenburg suffered. More often than not, the mercenaries he hired did more harm to the people of Brandenburg than to the Swedish troops, whom they were unable to expel. By the time of George William's death in 1640, Brandenburg-Prussia was on the verge of dissolution.

== Later years ==
When Frederick William acceded to Brandenburg's throne in 1640, he began curtailing the powers of Schwarzenberg, assuming them himself or granting them to Götzen. The new elector demoted the Rhinelander to Governor of Brandenburg. Frederick William had long resented Schwarzenberg, believing that the minister had tried to poison him in 1638 when the prince was ill with measles.

Schwarzenberg died unexpectedly in 1641, allegedly from fright caused by his rioting mercenaries. Although his administration of Brandenburg's meager resources was largely unsuccessful during the Thirty Years' War, it marked the beginning of the state's curtailment of the estates, a process continued by Frederick William, the "Great Elector". Schwarzenberg's successor as Governor of Brandenburg, Samuel von Winterfeld, negotiated a treaty of peace with Sweden.

Cuno von Uechtritz-Steinkirch designed a bust of Schwarzenberg for Berlin's Siegesallee; along with a bust of Colonel Konrad von Burgsdorff, the statue of Schwarzenberg flanked that of Elector George William. The memorial was unveiled on 23 December 1899.

== Notes ==
Adam, Count of Schwarzenberg Born: 26 August 1583 Died: 14 March 1641
Preceded by Joachim Sigismund, Markgraf zu Brandenburg	Herrenmeister (Grand Master) of the Order of Saint John; 1625-1641	Succeeded by Georg von Winterfeld, Landvogt der Neumark, Komtur zu Schivelbein
