= Konrad von Burgsdorff =

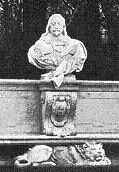
- Konrad von Burgsdorff; bust in the Siegesallee, by Cuno von Uechtritz-Steinkirch
- Born: 1 December 1595; Zehden (?)
- Died: 11 February 1652 (aged 56); Berlin

Konrad von Burgsdorff (1595-1652) was a Chief Chamberlain and Privy Councilor for the Electorate of Brandenburg, in command of all the fortresses there, and a Knight in the Order of Saint John. He was also a member of the Fruitbearing Society, devoted to standardizing the German language.

== Biography ==
His father, Alexander Magnus von Burgsdorff (1567–1620), was a Captain in Zehden. His mother, Katharina von Roebel (1576–1615), was a daughter of the Field Marshal, Joachim von Roebel. In 1609, he became a childhood companion of Prince (later Elector) George William. In 1612, he accompanied him to school in Frankfurt an der Oder, then to the Duchy of Cleves. He joined the army and became an Fähnrich (officer candidate) in 1614. At one point, he was so seriously wounded that he was left for dead on the battlefield. He was discovered alive the next morning, and required a year to fully recover. When he returned to Brandenburg, he was named a Chamberlain and joined George William's court bodyguard. He was promoted to Hauptmann in 1620.

In 1623, he was promoted to Oberstleutnant and ordered to recruit five companies of horsemen. Three years later, he was given the same rank in a foot regiment. In 1630, he organized a special unit of 400 men from the bodyguards. He was promoted to Oberst in 1632, and given command of two regiments, one of horse and one of foot. Shortly after, he was given command of the city and Spandau Citadel. After 1640, he was also in command of the town and fortress of Küstrin. During the Thirty Years' War, he fought in several sieges and battles. His successes led to much envy. Adam, Count of Schwarzenberg, was especially vocal in his attempts to bring him down, but they ultimately came to nothing.

In 1636, he married Elisabeth von Loeben (1604–1684), daughter of the Privy Councilor, Johann von Loeben and his wife, Margarete von Winterfeld. Their daughter, Margarethe (1637-1692), was married three times. The poet and diplomat, Friedrich von Canitz, was a child of her first marriage.

George William died in 1640, and was succeeded by Frederick William, who named Burgsdorff a Councilor and put him in command of all the fortresses in the Electorate. In 1646, Frederick William sent him to the Netherlands to petition Frederick Henry, Prince of Orange, for the hand of his daughter Countess Louise Henriette of Nassau, a mission which was successful but would prove to be to Konrad's detriment, as he was dismissed from all of his offices, under her instigation, in January 1652. He died a mere two weeks later. The cause is unknown.

There is a well known anecdote concerning Burgsdorff: One night, after putting his master to bed, he encountered a "White Woman" on the steps of Berlin City Palace. After overcoming his shock, he shouted: "You old sacramental whore, haven't you drunk enough royal blood yet, do you want more?" (according to legend, the appearance of such a figure foretells the death of a Hohenzollern). Annoyed by this, the apparition grabbed him by the neck and threw him downstairs, cracking his bones. George William was apparently quite fond of telling this story.
