= Norbert Pfretzschner =

Austrian sculptor and author

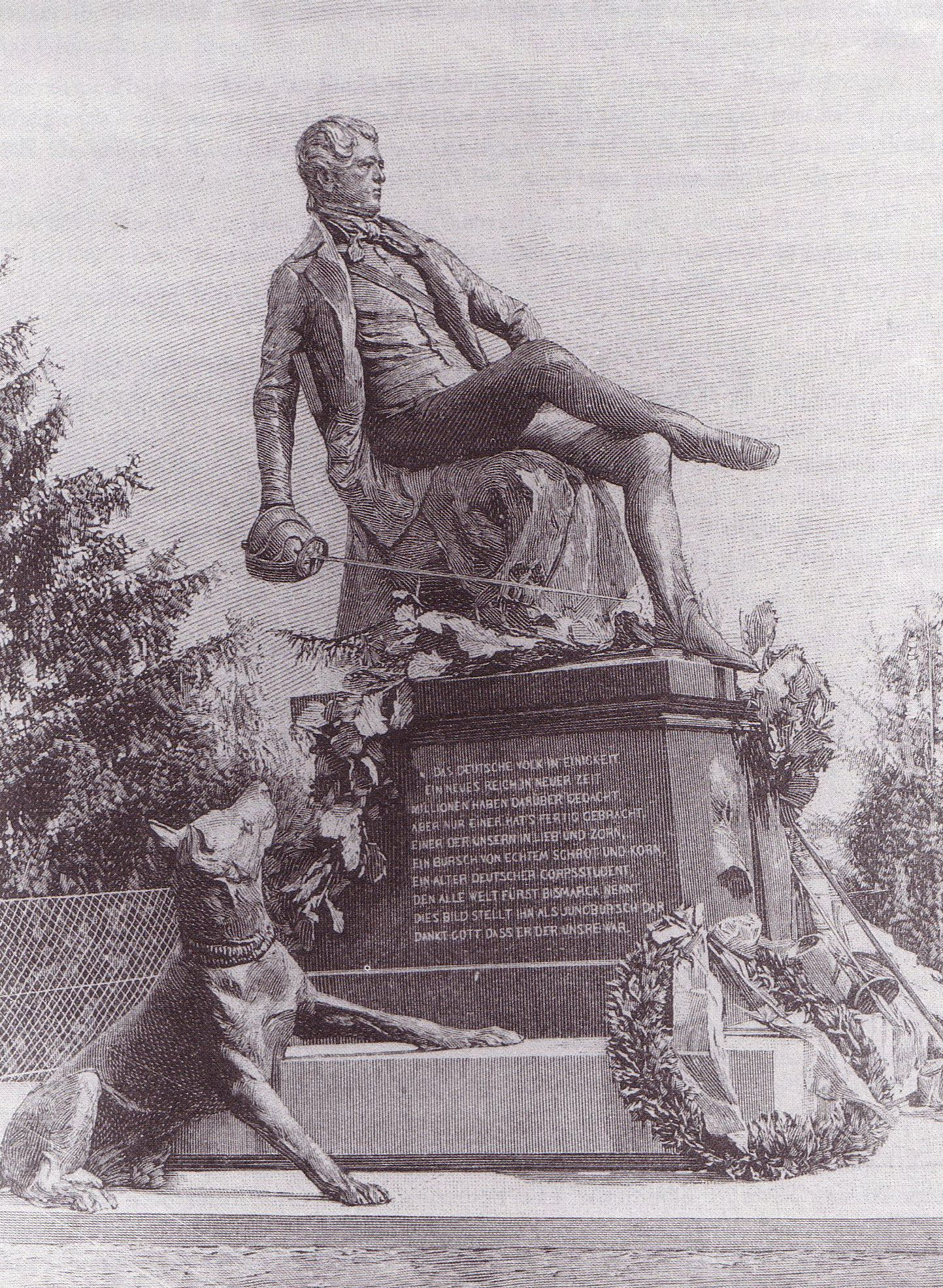
Engraving of the original "Young Bismarck Monument" in Bad Kösen

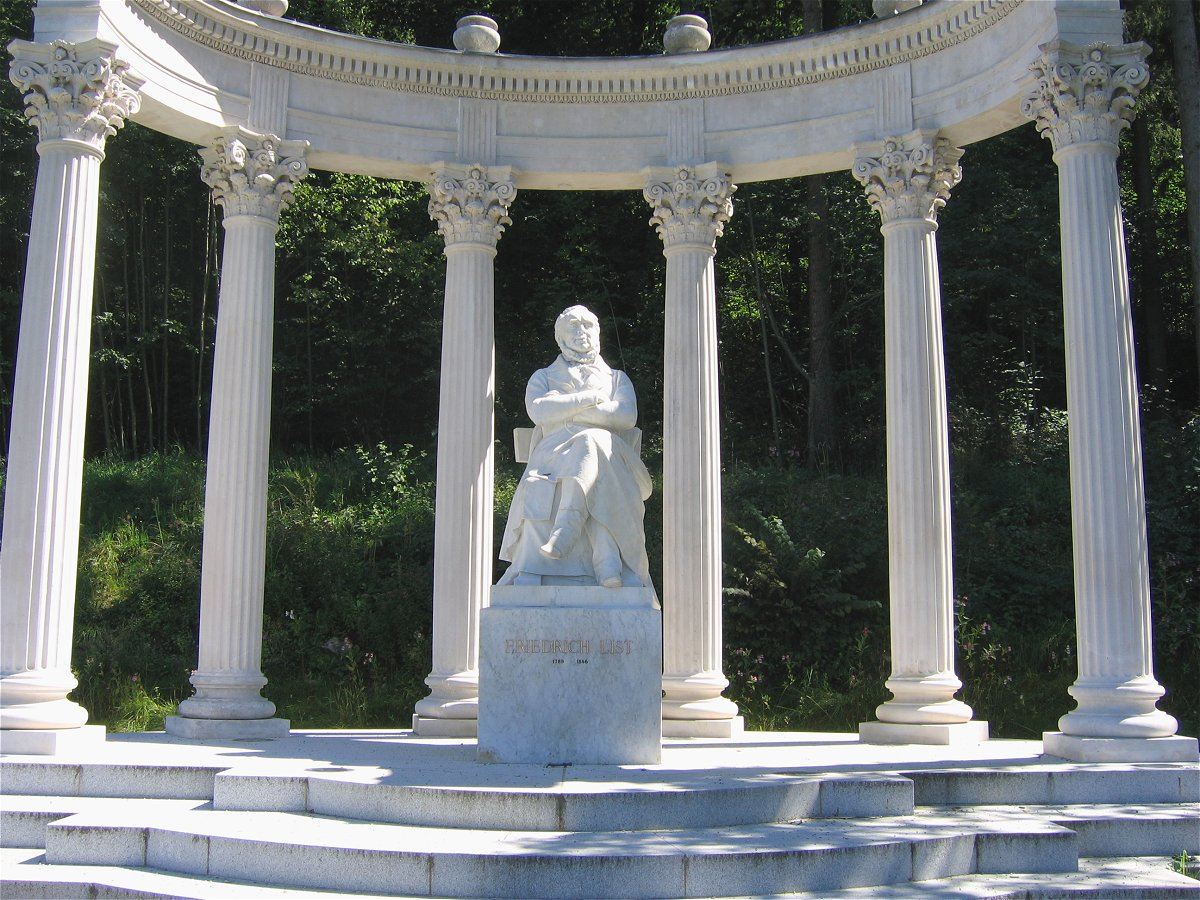
Friedrich List Monument

Norbert Pfretzschner (1 September 1850, Kufstein - 28 December 1927, Lana an der Etsch) was an Austrian sculptor and author of books on hunting.

== Life ==
His father, Norbert senior, was a physician, an Imperial Councillor and member of the Austrian Reichstag, who was interested in art and photography. Franz Hanfstaengl, the well-known Munich photographer, was one of his uncles.

He attended schools in Brixen and Innsbruck and served as a nurse during the Franco-Prussian War. In 1871, following his father's wishes, he began studying economics, eventually attending schools in Leipzig, Breisgau and Freiburg, where he was a member of the Corps Suevia Freiburg. His interest in hunting led him to give up his studies and take positions as a game warden and forester, first for the estates of Count Ernst II, then in Schillersdorf, Upper Silesia, for Nathaniel Meyer von Rothschild., but he had to quit due to an illness. After convalescing in Munich an acquaintance, Eduard von Grützner, suggested art as a career, so Pfretzschner studied sculpture with Edmund von Hellmer in Vienna and Ludwig Manzel in Berlin, where he worked from 1891 to 1913, becoming a Professor at the Prussian Academy of Art.

At the beginning of World War I, despite being 64 years old, he volunteered for the Kaiserjäger Regiment and served on the front lines, later becoming a Major in the Kaiserschützen. He retired to Lana after the war and wrote the hunting novel Peter Rießer, der Wildmeister von Hinterriß. His son Ernst was a well-known architect who worked in Austria and Argentina.

== Selected major works ==
- His best known work was the "Young Bismarck" monument at the Rudelsburg near Bad Kösen. It was highly controversial at the time, despite having been authorized by Bismarck himself. The Communist government removed it in 1951 and it was "lost". In 2006, it was replaced with a copy.
- Giant heads of bison, wild boars, and bears at the castle of Count Thiele-Winkler
- Brehm-Schlegel Monument in Altenburg
- Figure Group 22 in the Siegesallee (Victory Avenue) project of Wilhelm II, consisting of Joachim III Frederick, Elector of Brandenburg as the central figure; flanked by Hieronymus von Schlick, Lord Chamberlain of the Privy Council in Cölln and Johann von Löben (1561-1636), Joachim's Chancellor. Pfretzschner was the only sculptor on the project who was not a German citizen.
- Friedrich List Monument in Kufstein
- Monument in St. Johann, Tyrol for Matthias Wißhofer (1752−1819), freedom fighter, clergyman, scientist and inventor.
