= Corps Suevia Freiburg =

Collegiate organization in Germany

Coordinates: 47°59′26.23″N 7°50′33.30″E

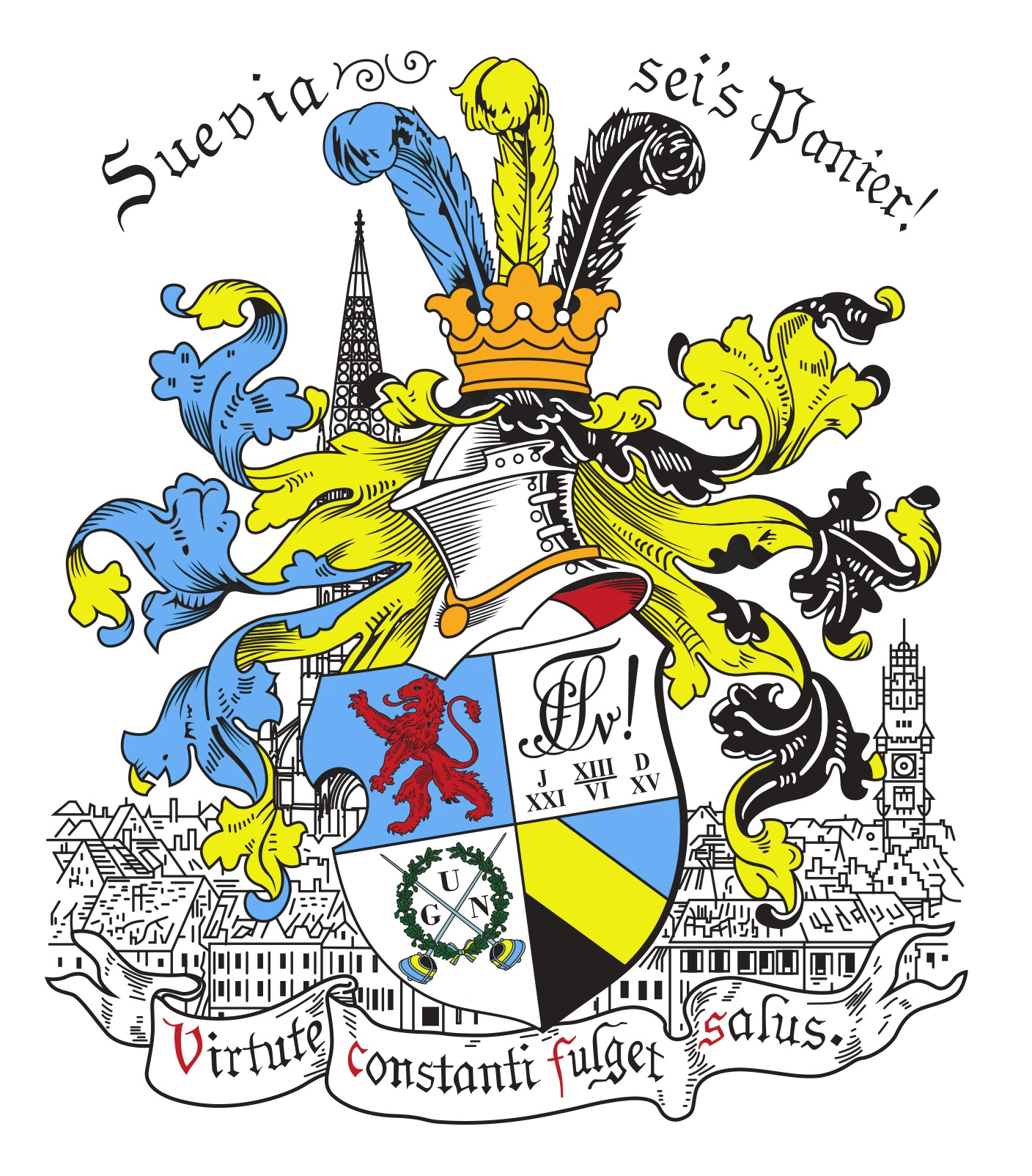
- Founded: June 21, 1815; 210 years ago Albert Ludwigs University of Freiburg
- Type: Studentenverbindung
- Affiliation: KSCV; SC
- Status: Active
- Emphasis: Dueling
- Scope: Local
- Motto: Virtute constanti fulget salus! "Health shines with constant power!"
- Colors: Black, Yellow and Blue
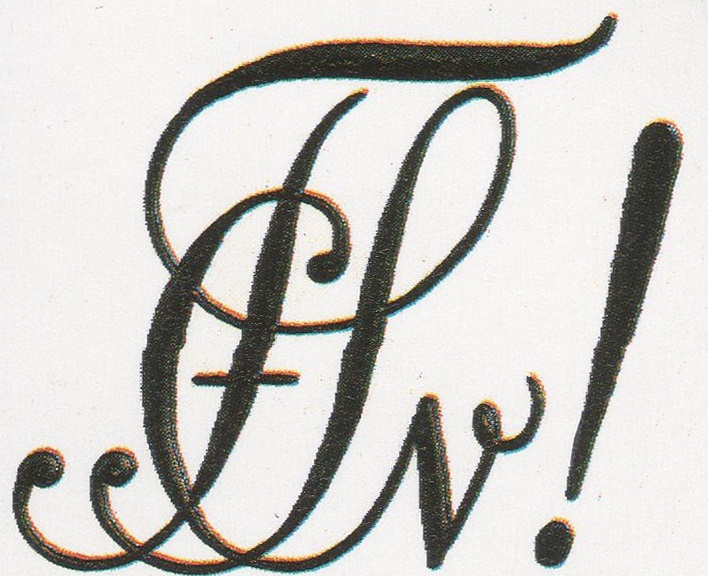
- Zirkel
- Chapters: 1
- Headquarters: Lessingstraße 14; Freiburg 79100; Germany
- Website: www.suevia-freiburg.de

The Corps Suevia Freiburg is one of the oldest German Student Corps, known as a Studentenverbindung or student corporation. It is located at the Albert Ludwigs University of Freiburg.

== History ==
The Corps Suevia Freiburg was founded by thirteen students at the Albert Ludwigs University of Freiburg on June 21, 1815. The founders were influenced by the late 18th and early 19th century philosophical school of German idealism.

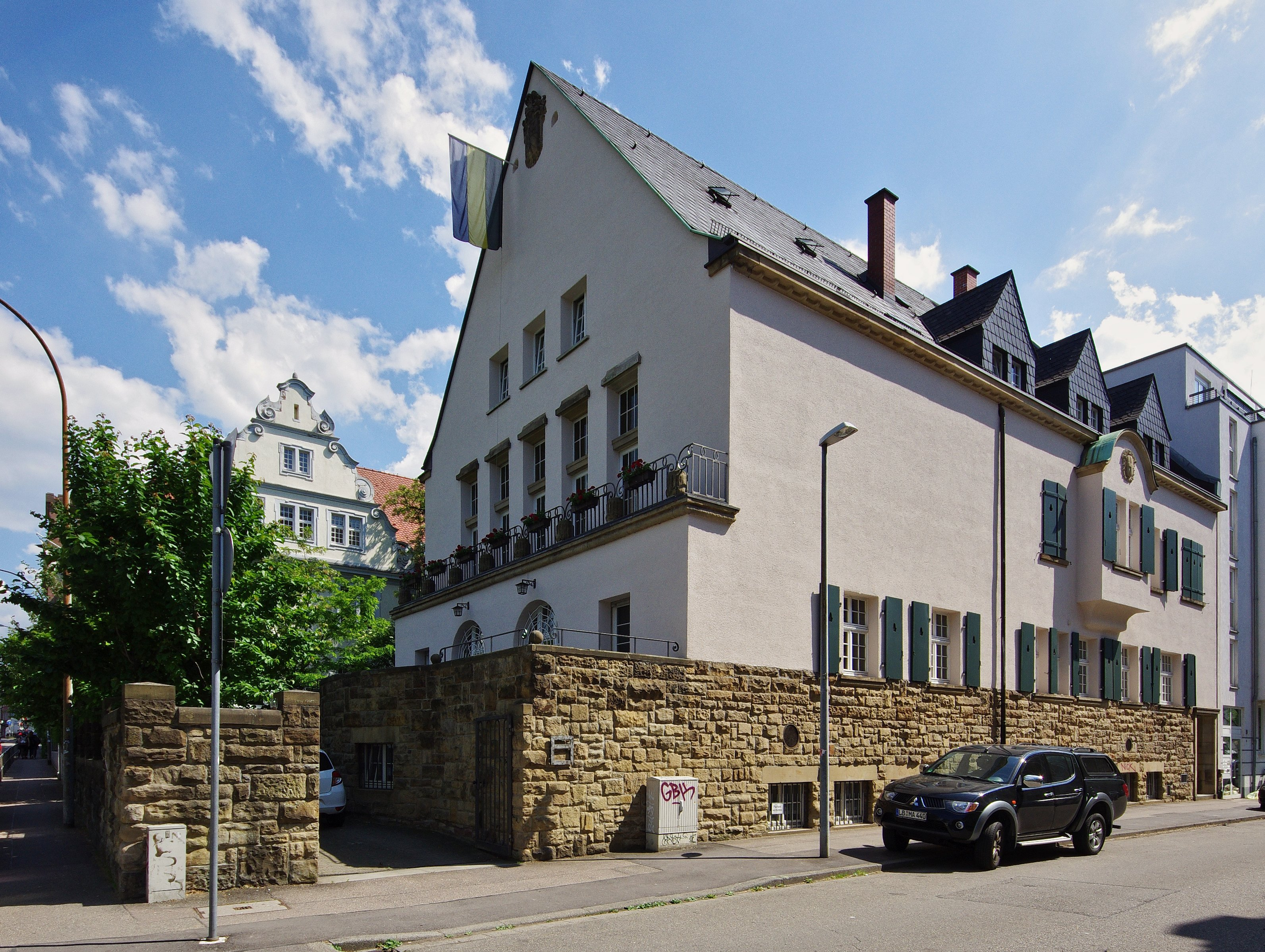
The Corps House

The corps is politically and religiously neutral and was founded on the principles of tolerance and democracy. It is committed to brotherhood, tolerance, scholarship, and academic excellence. It is a dueling fraternity that practices academic fencing.

The corps house, or Schwabenhaus, is in Freiburg was designed by Hermann Billing in 1910. It is in Baden Art Nouveau style, with clean lines.

The Corps Suevia Freiburg is a member of the Freiburger Senioren Convent (SC) and a founding member of the Kösener Senioren-Convents-Verband (KSCV), the oldest fraternity association in Germany, Austria, and Switzerland.

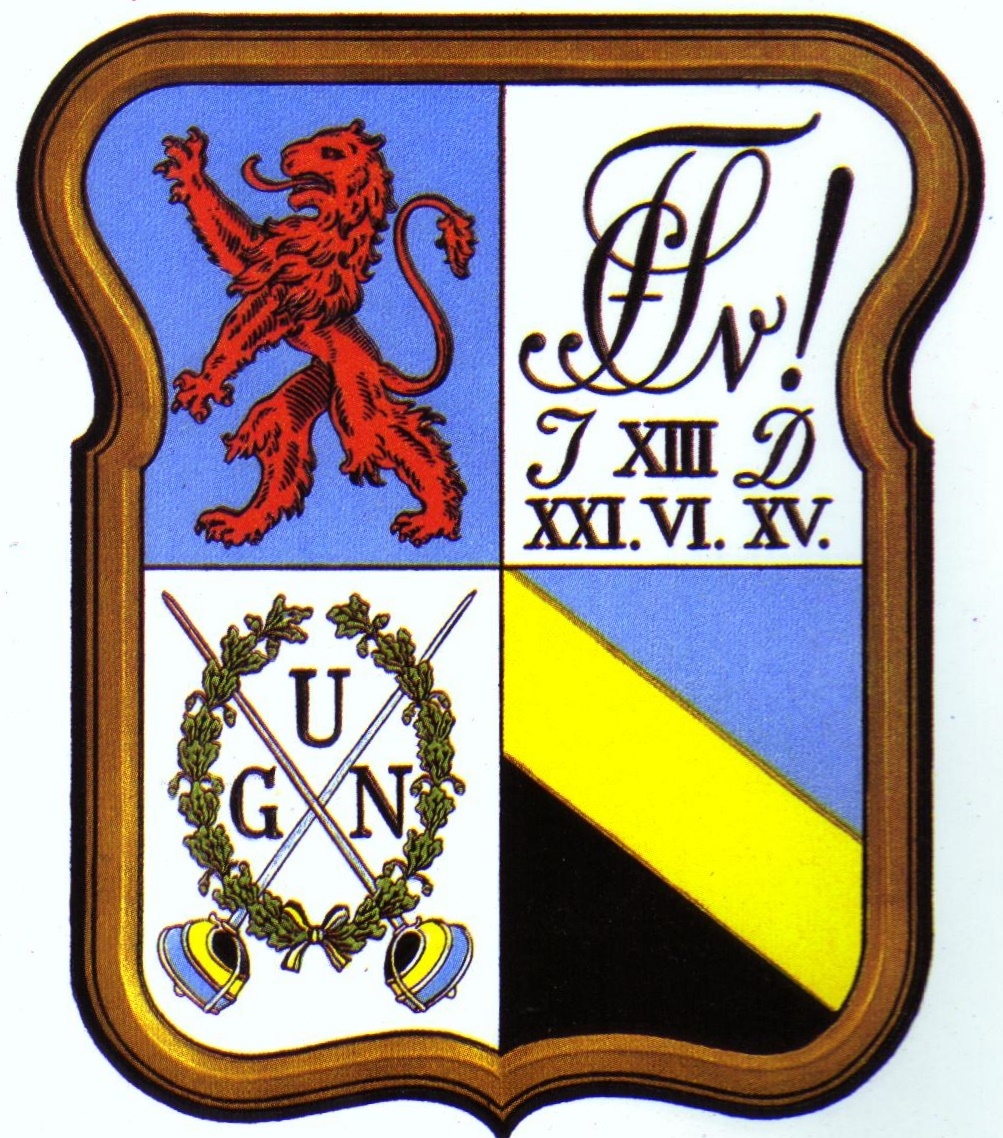
Corps Suevia's seal

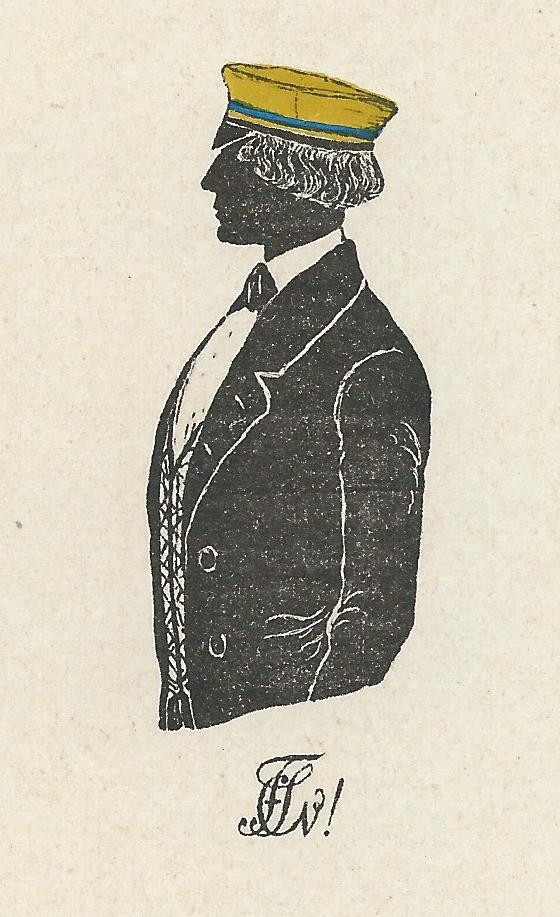
Man wearing a corp's couleur (cap), 1925

== Symbols and traditions ==
Its members wear its colors (ribbon) and a couleur (cap) on official occasions. The ribbon includes the corps' official colors: black, yellow, and blue.

Because of the cultural commitment to equality, members refer to each other as “Du” (you), but it is customary for members to refer to one another using their last names.

Suevia's Latin motto is Virtute constanti fulget salus! or "Health shines with constant power!" Its guiding principle and the main pillar of its constitution is democracy.

== Activities ==
Members of the corps are expected to complete their academic studies successfully and quickly. Its members also practice Mensuren or ritualized combat and academic fencing with a Korbschläger, a sword with a basket-type hilt and sharp blade. Each member much compete in at least four Mensuren combats for the Corps' colors.

The corps hosts seminars, supports academic and vocational practice periods, organizes cultural trips to Europe, and supports language and intercultural skills. Its members attend dance classes, lectures, theater, concerts, and weekly meals.

== Membership ==
Membership in Corps Suevia Freiburg is open to male students who attend a Frieburg college. Potential members submit a written application and are selected based on personal character, regardless of ethnicity, nationality, or social status. After completing an initial probatory period as a "fuchs" (fox), prospective members will have the opportunity to become full members.

The corps includes two types of members: Aktiven (active members) and Altherrenschaft (senior members) who have graduated from college. The active members oversee the daily operations of the corps and its chapter house, while the alumni provide financial support and scholarships for active members.

== Notable members ==
- Adolf Marschall von Bieberstein, State Secretary of the Foreign Office of the German Empire
- Edward Blom, archivist, trade historian, writer and a television personality
- Prince Frederick Charles of Hesse, King of Finland
- Norbert Pfretzschner, sculptor and author
- Ernst Scholz, lawyer and chairman of the German People's Party
- Heinrich Triepel, legal scholar

== See also ==
- List of members of German student corps
