= August Julius Streichenberg =

German sculptor and professor

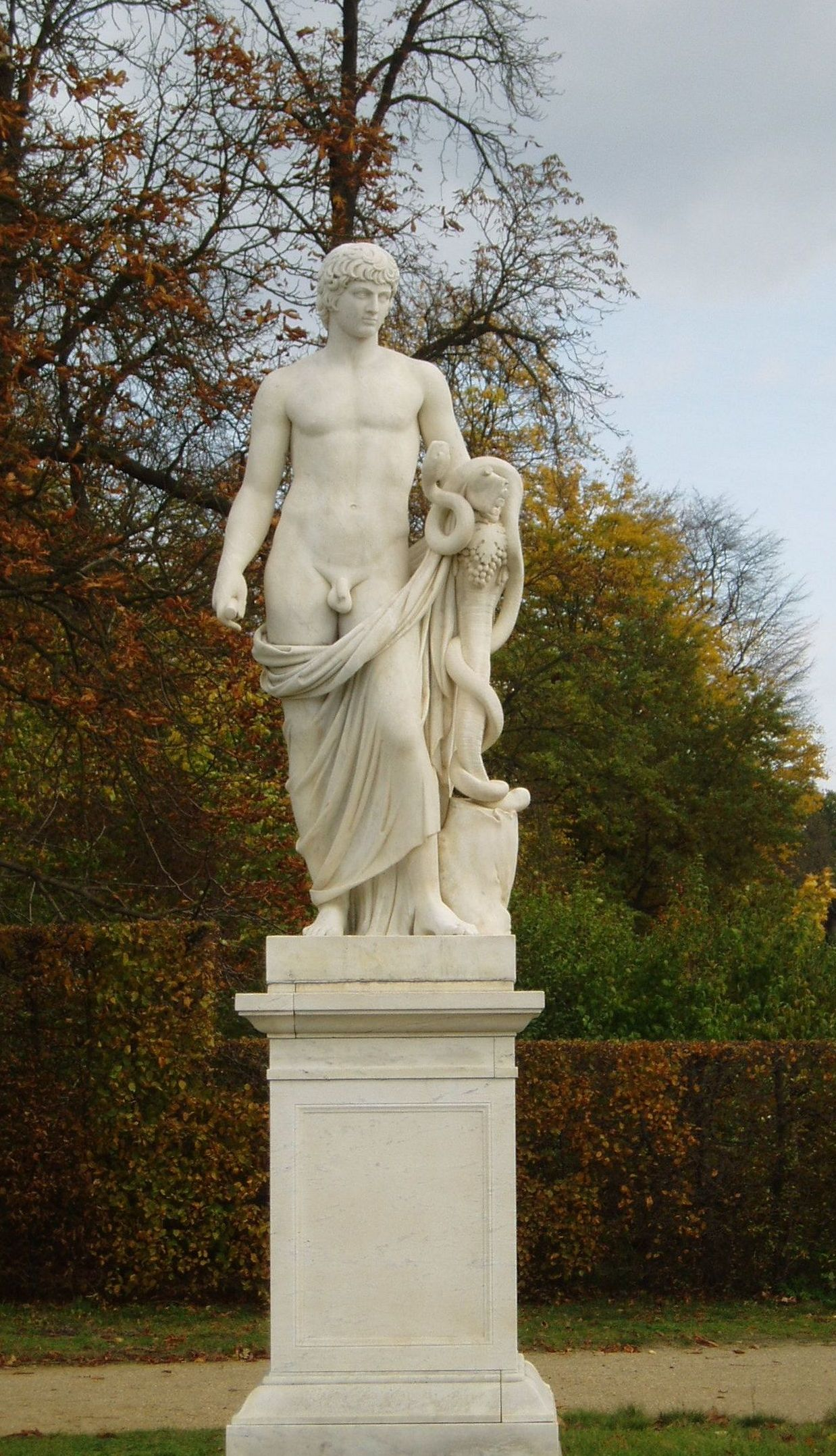
Antinous

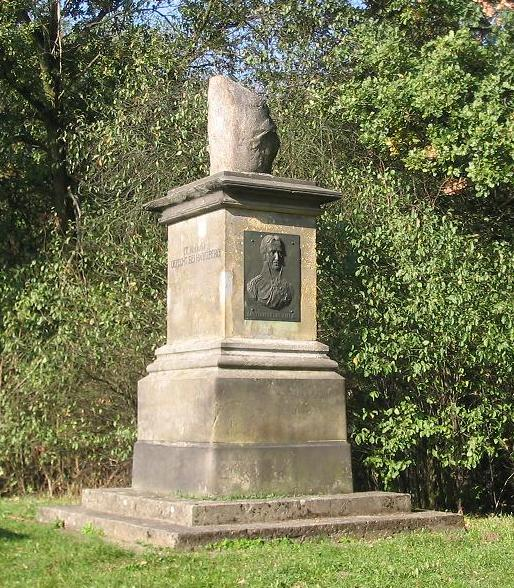
Borussia

August Julius Streichenberg (5 February 1814, Angermünde – 10 January 1878, Berlin) was a German sculptor and art professor.

His father, Carl Streichenberg, was a master tailor. He studied sculpting in Paris with David d'Angers. After spending time in St. Petersburg, Rome and Greece, he settled in Berlin, where he worked for Christian Daniel Rauch. Later, he was a professor of sculpture at the Berlin University of the Arts. His best known students were Ernst Gottfried Vivié and Albert Manthe.

== Selected major works ==
- 1842: statue of his daughter Olga, in Carrara marble
- 1848–1849: Borussia (the Latin name for Prussia), monument to the Battle of Hagelberg (1813, War of the Sixth Coalition, near Belzig); for which he was awarded the "Great Gold Medal"
- 1852: Antinous at the Neues Palais in Potsdam
- 1858: tomb of Ferdinand Streichenberg-Scharmer (1838–1856), at the Alter St.-Matthäus-Kirchhof in Berlin
- 1860: Hagar and Ishmael, purchased by King Friedrich Wilhelm IV for Lindstedt Castle in Potsdam.

== Sources and further reading ==
- "Streichenberg, August Julius". In: Hans Vollmer (Ed.): Allgemeines Lexikon der Bildenden Künstler von der Antike bis zur Gegenwart, Vol.32: Stephens–Theodotos. E. A. Seemann, Leipzig 1938, pg.178
- Peter Bloch, Sibylle Einholz, Jutta von Simson (Eds.): Ethos und Pathos. Die Berliner Bildhauerschule 1786–1914. Exhibition catalog, Berlin 1990. Vol.II
- Saskia Hüneke, Bauten und Bildwerke im Park Sanssouci, Gärten Berlin-Brandenburg, 2000
- Dieter Hübener, Kristina Hübener, Julius H. Schoeps (Eds.): Kriegerdenkmale in Brandenburg von den Befreiungskrieges 1813/14 bis in die Gegenwart, Bebra Verlag, 2003 ISBN 978-3-89809-302-6
- Judith Winkler, Iris Berndt, Jörg Kuhn (Ed.): Albert Manthe als Mensch und Künstler, Exhibition catalog, Ehm Welk- und Heimatmuseum Angermünde, 2007.
- Macht und Freundschaft. Berlin-St. Petersburg 1800–1860, Exhibition catalog, Koehler and Amelang GmbH, 2008, pg.278 ISBN 978-3-7338-0363-6
- Katrin Lesser, Jörg Kuhn, Detlev Pietzsch (Eds.): Gartendenkmale in Berlin, Friedhöfe, Michael Imhof, Petersberg 2008, pg.313 ISBN 978-3-86568-293-2
