= Cuno von Uechtritz-Steinkirch =

German sculptor

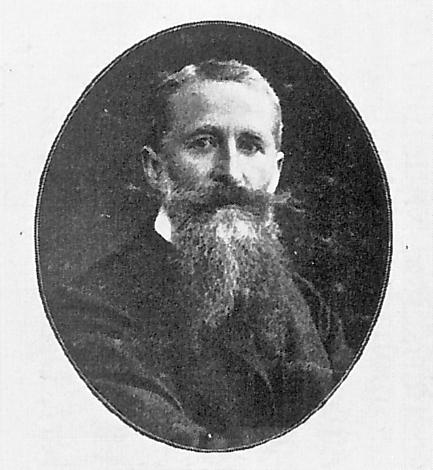
Cuno von Uechtritz-Steinkirch (c.1901)

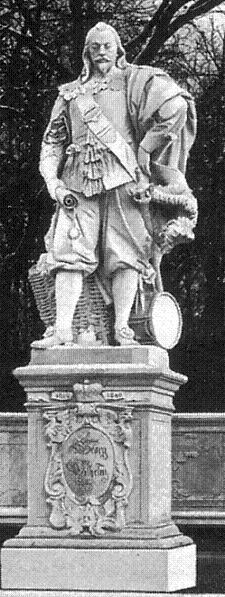
Georg Wilhelm from the Siegesallee

Cuno von Uechtritz-Steinkirch (3 July 1856, Breslau - 29 July 1908, Berlin) was a German sculptor.

== Life ==
Since his youth he had pursued art as a hobby, but did not decide to become a sculptor until he was twenty-one. The occasion was a figure he made of the writer Karl von Holtei, which impressed Kaiser Wilhelm I so much that he bought it on the spot. In 1878 and 1879, Uechtritz travelled throughout Italy to see the old masters first hand. Upon his return, he began taking lessons in the studios of Carl Friedrich Echtermeier, a former Master Student of Ernst Julius Hähnel. Later, he met Hähnel and became his student.

He completed his studies at the Academy of Fine Arts, Vienna, under Viktor Oskar Tilgner, who taught him how to make polychrome figures. His first work in that style (Piper with Monkey) was acquired by the National Gallery in 1889. He remained with Tilgner as an employee until 1887, when he opened his own studios in Berlin.

His financial breakthrough came in 1897 with an allegorical figure group called Die Krone als Hort des Friedens (The Crown as a Haven of Peace), which fit in so well with the contemporary political propaganda that Kaiser Wilhelm II ordered it to be made in marble for the Herrenhaus. This work led to him receiving one of the coveted commissions for the Siegesallee (Victory Avenue) project. The Kaiser was pleased with his contribution and appointed him a Professor in 1899. Although this monumental work made his reputation, lighter, more imaginative pieces, especially fountains, were his true forte.

In 1907, he was one of the signatories on a letter addressed to Chancellor Bernhard von Bülow, stating that the market for art in Germany was oversaturated and suggesting that a greater effort be made to sell art in the United States, despite that country's preference for works in the French style. It is, perhaps, no coincidence that the American sculptor Harriet Whitney Frishmuth was one of his students at the time.

== Selected major works ==
Berlin

- 1898: Charlottenburg, "The Temple of Neptune", a waterfall and fountain with figures of Leda and the Swan, at the Berlin Zoo
- 1899: Siegesallee Group 24, consisting of Georg Wilhelm, Elector of Brandenburg as the central figure; flanked by Konrad von Burgsdorff, Commandant of Spandau and Küstrin during the Thirty Years' War, and Adam, Count of Schwarzenberg. These figures were damaged during World War II and are currently on display at the Spandau Citadel.
- 1904: Tiergarten, Großer Stern, "Hubertusbrunnen" (Saint Hubertus Fountain) in the style of Dürer, central figure, with four hunting-related figures by other sculptors. The fountain was dismantled in 1938 during Hitler's efforts to redesign Berlin. The statue of Hubertus was lost or destroyed. The other figures were put back after the war, near the Großer Stern.
- 1910: Nikolsburger Platz, "Gänselieselbrunnen" (Mother Goose Fountain), from a design completed just before his death. By the end of World War II, all the parts had been melted. In 1987, the Berliner Industriebank (now the Weberbank) presented the city with a faithful copy made by the sculptor Harald Haacke, who apparently specialized in producing replicas of lost works.

Other cities

- 1897: Landsberg an der Warthe, "Pauckschbrunnen", a gift to the city by industrialist Hermann Paucksch, a manufacturer of steam boilers. The original was destroyed during World War II. In 1997, it was replaced with a copy made by Polish sculptor Zofia Bilińska.
- 1904: St. Louis, statue of Friedrich Wilhelm von Steuben, commissioned for display at the Louisiana Purchase Exposition (World's Fair). Since 1968, a smaller version by an unknown sculptor has been in Tower Grove Park. The fate of the original appears to be undocumented.
- 1907: Wandsbek (Hamburg), "Puvogelbrunnen", named after Friedrich Puvogel (?-1907), a long-serving Vice-Mayor of Wandsbek, and donated by the Wandsbeker Beautification Association. It fell from its base at the Christ Church in 1998 and underwent extensive renovation, with an eye towards maintaining its original character. In 2006, it was dedicated as part of a newly remodeled "Puvogel Gardens".
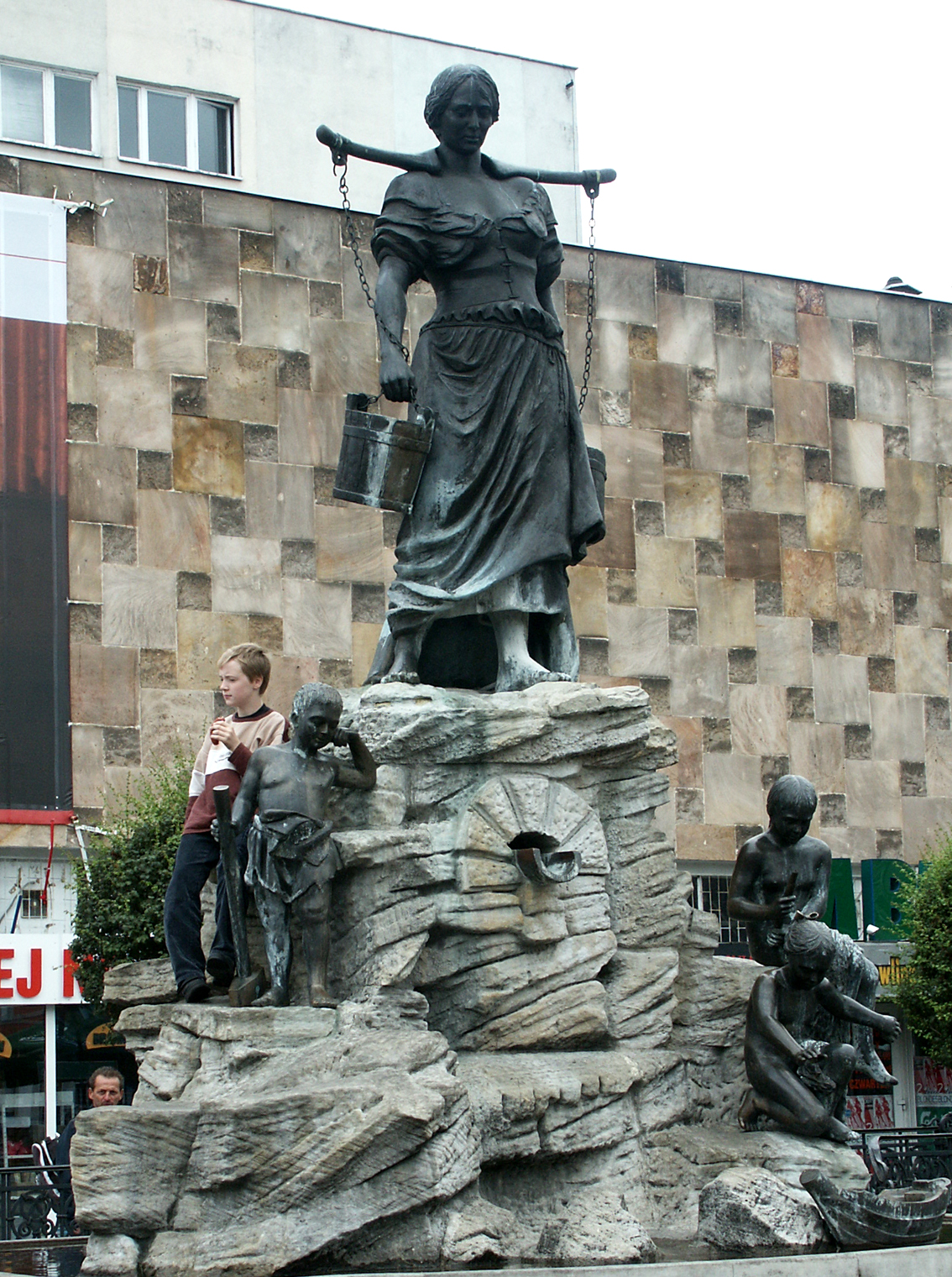
The reconstructed Pauckschbrunnen

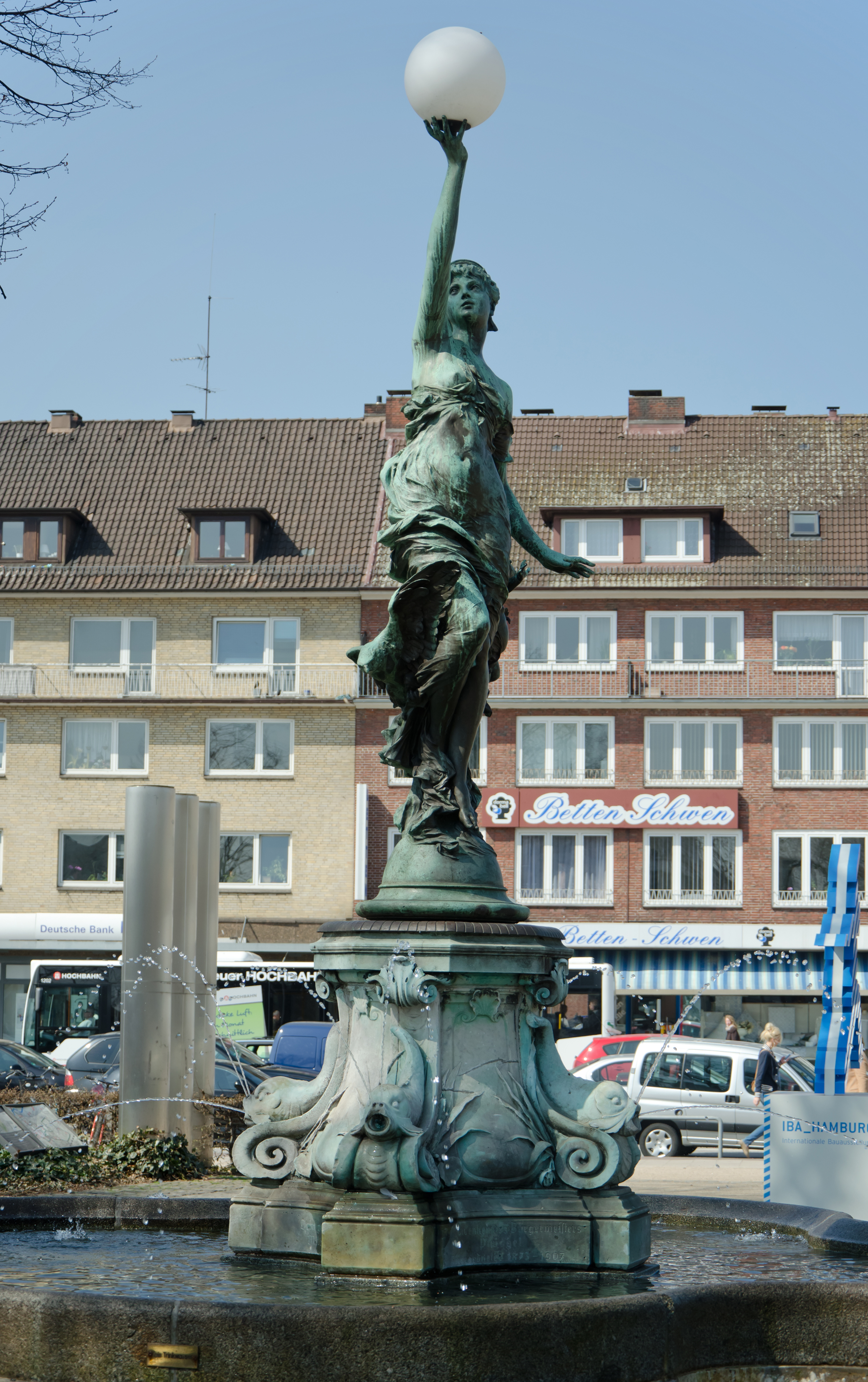
The restored Puvogelbrunnen

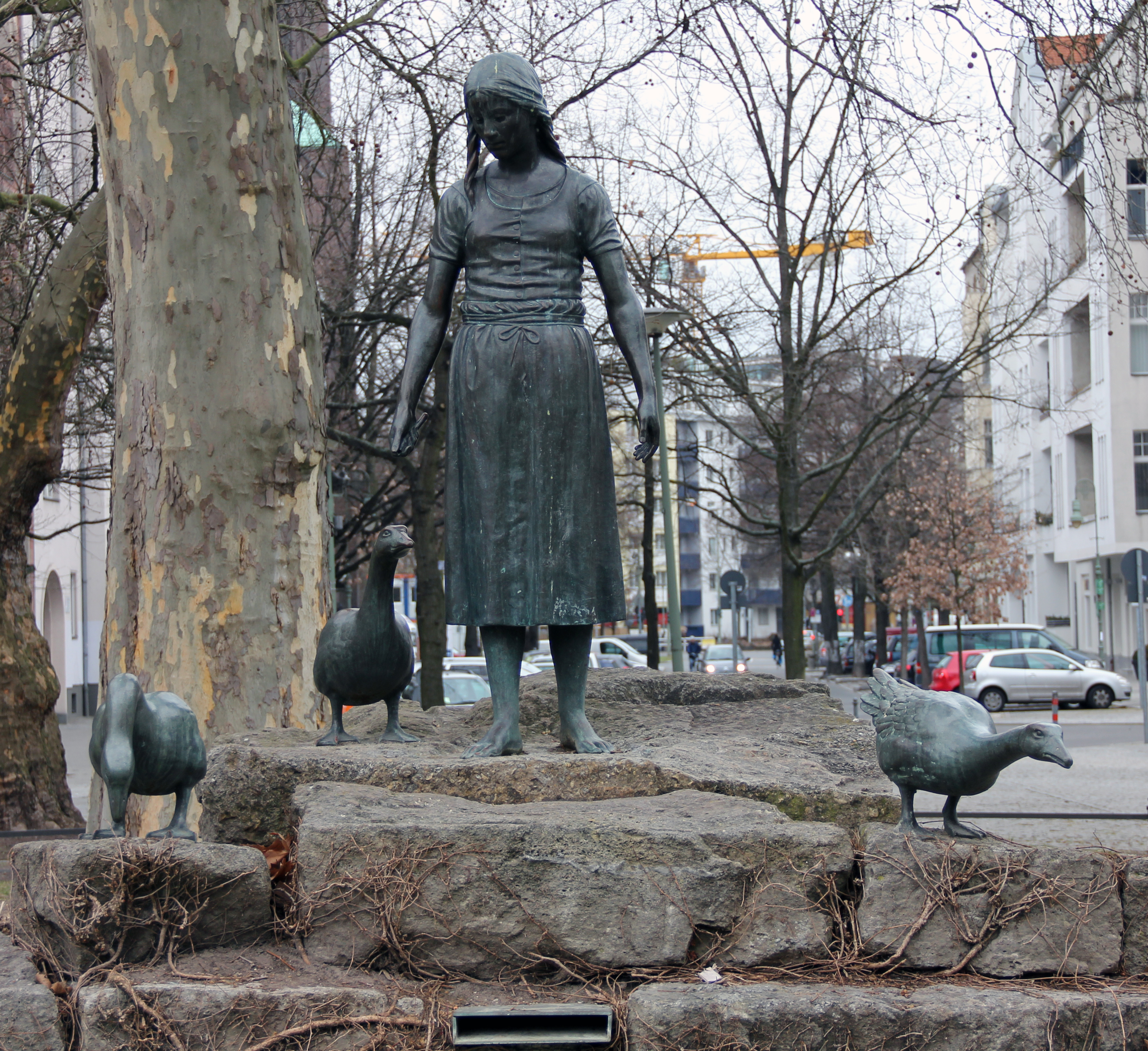
The recreated Gänselieselbrunnen

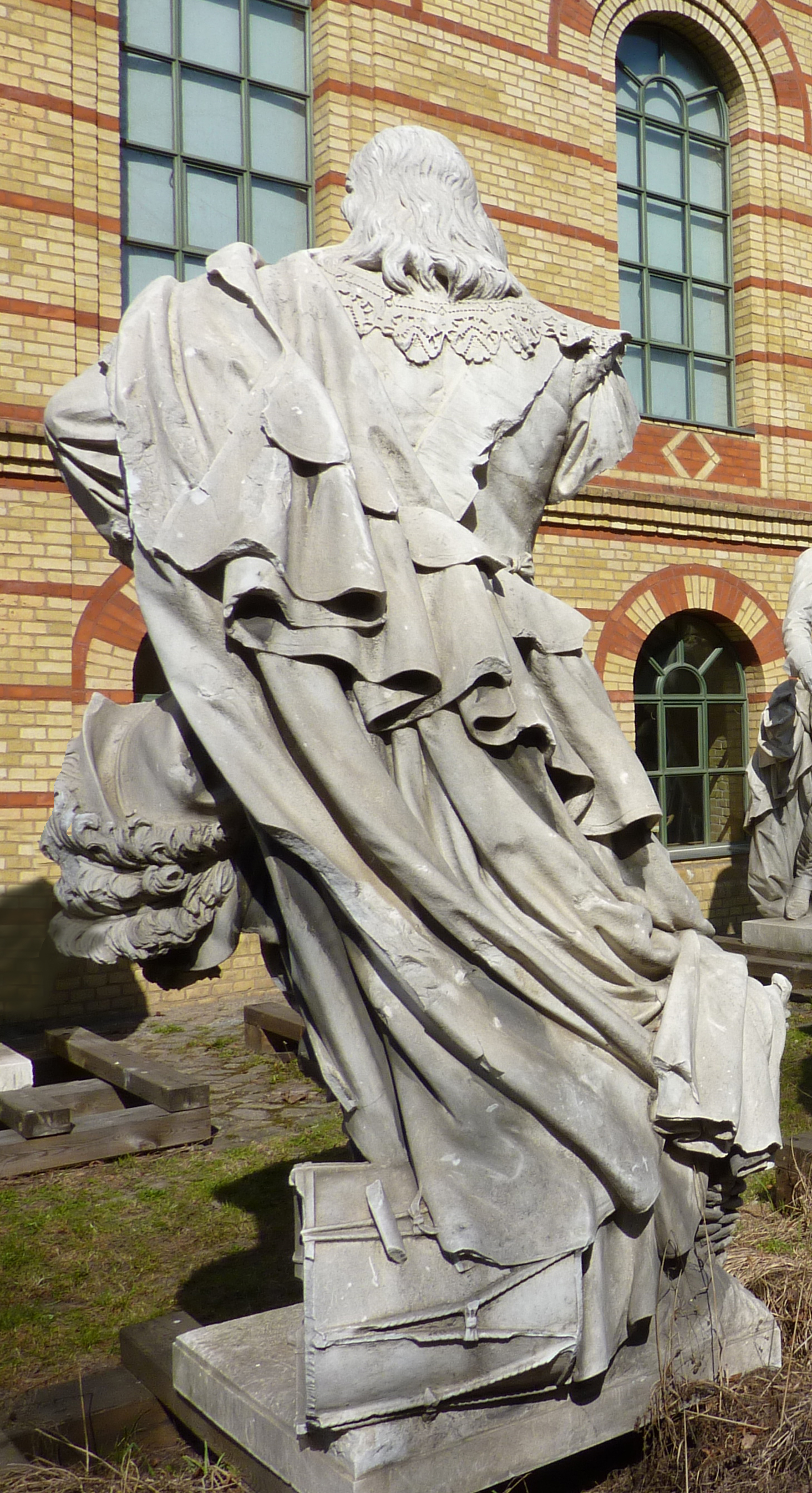
Reverse of the Georg Wilhelm statue, showing the cape.
