= Matthias Wißhofer =

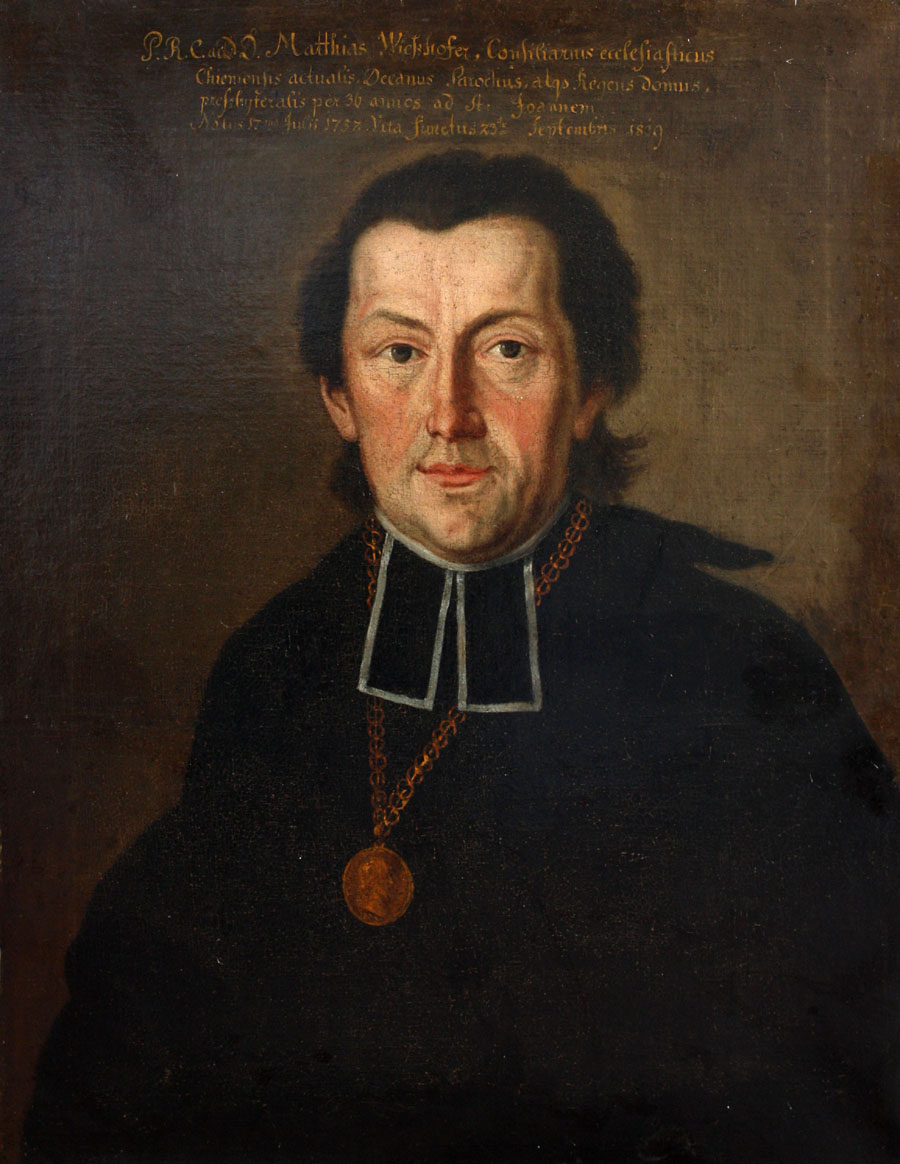
Matthias Wißhofer; portrait by Maria Anna Moser (1820)

Matthias Wißhofer (also Wieshofer, Wießhofer, Wishofer and Wisshofer; 1752, Kössen - 23 September 1819, St. Johann in Tirol) was an Austrian freedom fighter, clergyman and pastor. He also served as the first school inspector for the Tyrolean Unterland. In addition, he was an amateur inventor, and is said to have devised an "electric shotgun".

== Biography ==
He was one of twelve children born to Matthias Wisshofer; a wainwright. He was a seminarist at the Domus Gregoriana in Munich and graduated from the Jesuitengymnasium (now the Wilhelmsgymnasium) in 1771. After studying theology at the Herrenchiemsee Monastery, he was employed by the Jesuits in Freiburg im Breisgau, where studied classical and modern languages. Later, he served at the Loreto Church in Salzburg, where he was ordained.

From 1781, he was Coadjutor Bishop in Hopfgarten im Brixental. During that time, he was also employed as Imperial Schulinspektor for Rattenberg, Kufstein and Kitzbühel. After 1783, he was the Dechant (Dean) in St. Johann.

In the course of the Tyrolean Rebellion (1809), during heavy fighting on the Pass Strub, he offered his life to the Bavarian Field Marshal, Karl Philipp von Wrede, in an effort to obtain mercy for the resistance fighters and prevent the destruction of St. Johann. He was sentenced to death by hanging. At the last moment, he received a pardon from the commander of the French forces, General François-Joseph Lefebvre.

The poetry collection, Bilder und Sagen (Pictures and Legends, 1889), contains a poem dedicated to him, by Bartholomäus Del Pero.

To mark the centenary of the Tyrolean resistance, a monument to Wißhofer him was constructed on St. Johann's main square. It was cast in bronze from a design by Norbert Pfretzschner, and placed on a marble plinth which serves as a fountain. The base in inscribed "Erretter aus Feindesnot" (roughly, Savior from Enemy Persecution, after Psalm 7).

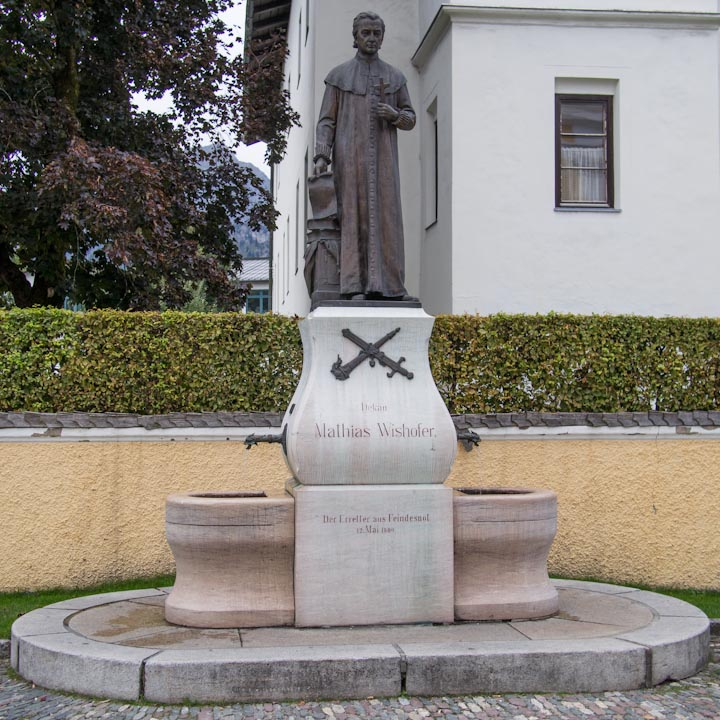
Monument to Wißhofer, St. Johann in Tirol; by Norbert Pfretzschner
