= Albert Manthe =

German sculptor

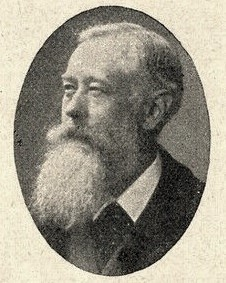
Albert Manthe (c.1900)

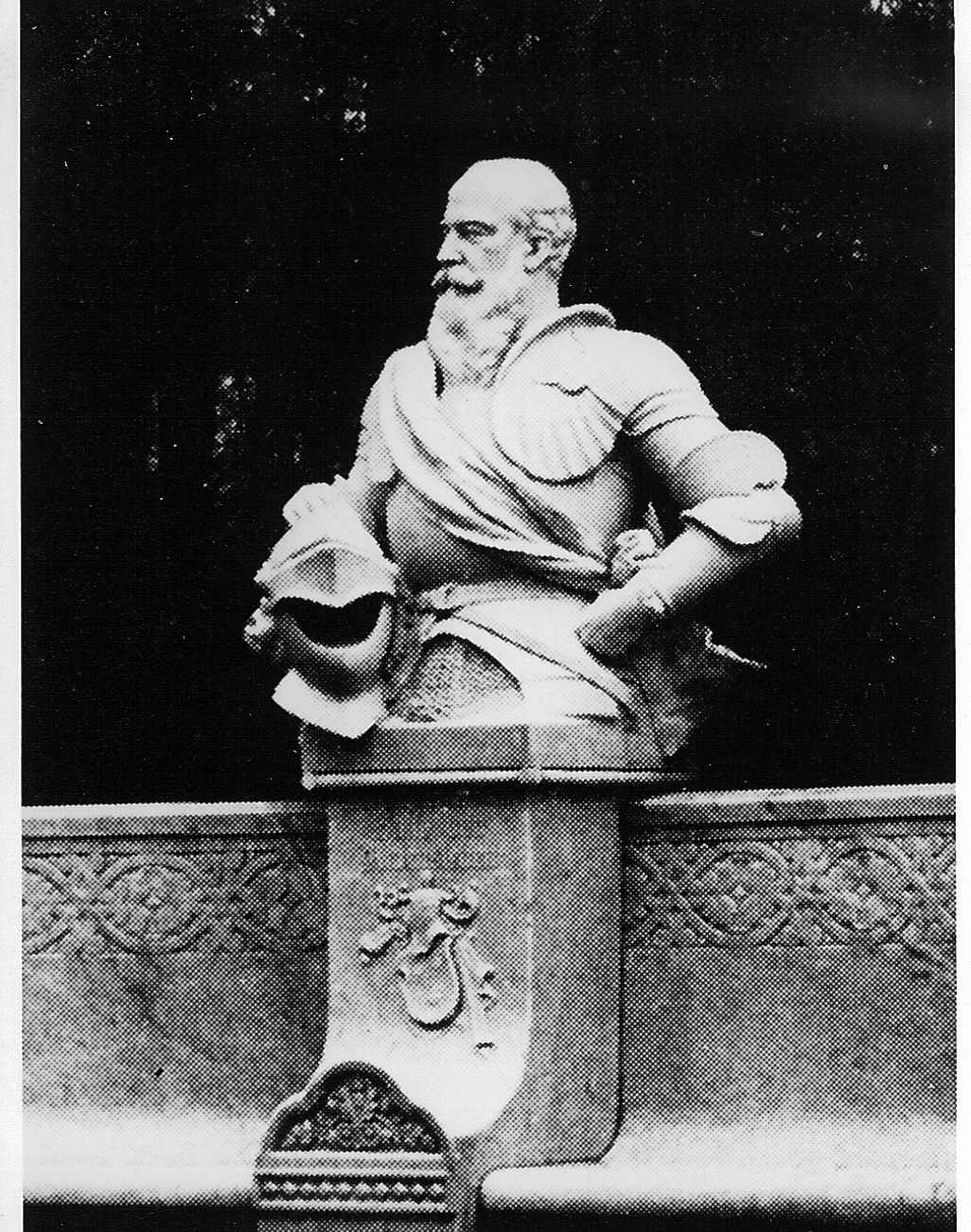
Busso von Alvensleben, from the Siegesallee.

Albert August Karl Manthe (18 August 1847, in Angermünde – 4 February 1929, in Berlin) was a German sculptor.

He studied at the Prussian Academy of Art under August Julius Streichenberg, Hermann Schievelbein and Hugo Hagen. After some further training in London, he lived in Berlin for the rest of his life. Models, sketches and other items from his estate may be seen at the Heimatmuseum Angermünde.

== Selected major works ==
- 1888: Berlin, Statues representing "Kriegskunst" and "Naturwissenschaft" (The Art of War and the Natural Sciences) in the City Palace (destroyed).
- 1888: Berlin, Colossal bust of the young Kaiser Wilhelm II, carved in gypsum.
- 1890: Berlin, Marble bust of Gustav Meyer on a red granite base in Treptower Park.
- 1892: Spandau, Statue of Kaiser Friedrich III, at the north end of the Charlotte Bridge. It was dismantled in 1926 and reassembled at Hakenfelde in 1932. Its whereabouts are currently unknown.
- 1893: Weißwasser, Upper Lusatia, Memorial for the Franco-Prussian War with a double figure of Kaisers Wilhelm I and Friedrich III, on the Kaiserplatz
- 1900: Berlin, Siegesallee (Victory Avenue) project, Group 18, with John Cicero, Elector of Brandenburg as the central figure, flanked by Eitelwolf von Stein (died 1515), co-founder of the University of Viadrina, and Busso VII von Alvensleben, Landeshauptmann of Altmark.
- 1900: Stralsund, Ernst Moritz Arndt Memorial, at the Gymnasium.
- 1909: Small statues of Fritz Reuter which served as models for the Reuter Monument in Stavenhagen.
- 1916: Berlin, bronze bust of Franz Ludwig Späth at the Späth family burial grounds in the Luisenstädtischer Friedhof.

== Sources ==
- Iris Berndt; Kornelia Woitalka: Der künstlerische Nachlaß des Bildhauers Albert Manthe im Heimatmuseum Angermünde. Angermünde, 1996, no ISBN
- Catalog: Albert Manthe als Mensch und Künstler, from the "Ehm Welk and Heimatmuseum Angermünde", edited by Judith Winkler, Iris Berndt and Jörg Kuhn, Angermünde 2007
