= Sophie Henschel =

German industrialist

Sophie Henschel (1841–1916) was a German industrialist. She was married to Oscar Henschel and the leader of Henschel & Son from his death in 1894 until 1910. She was one of the richest women in Germany. She was known as a patron of the arts and was given the Wilhelm-Orden.
