= Fritz Gerth =

German sculptor

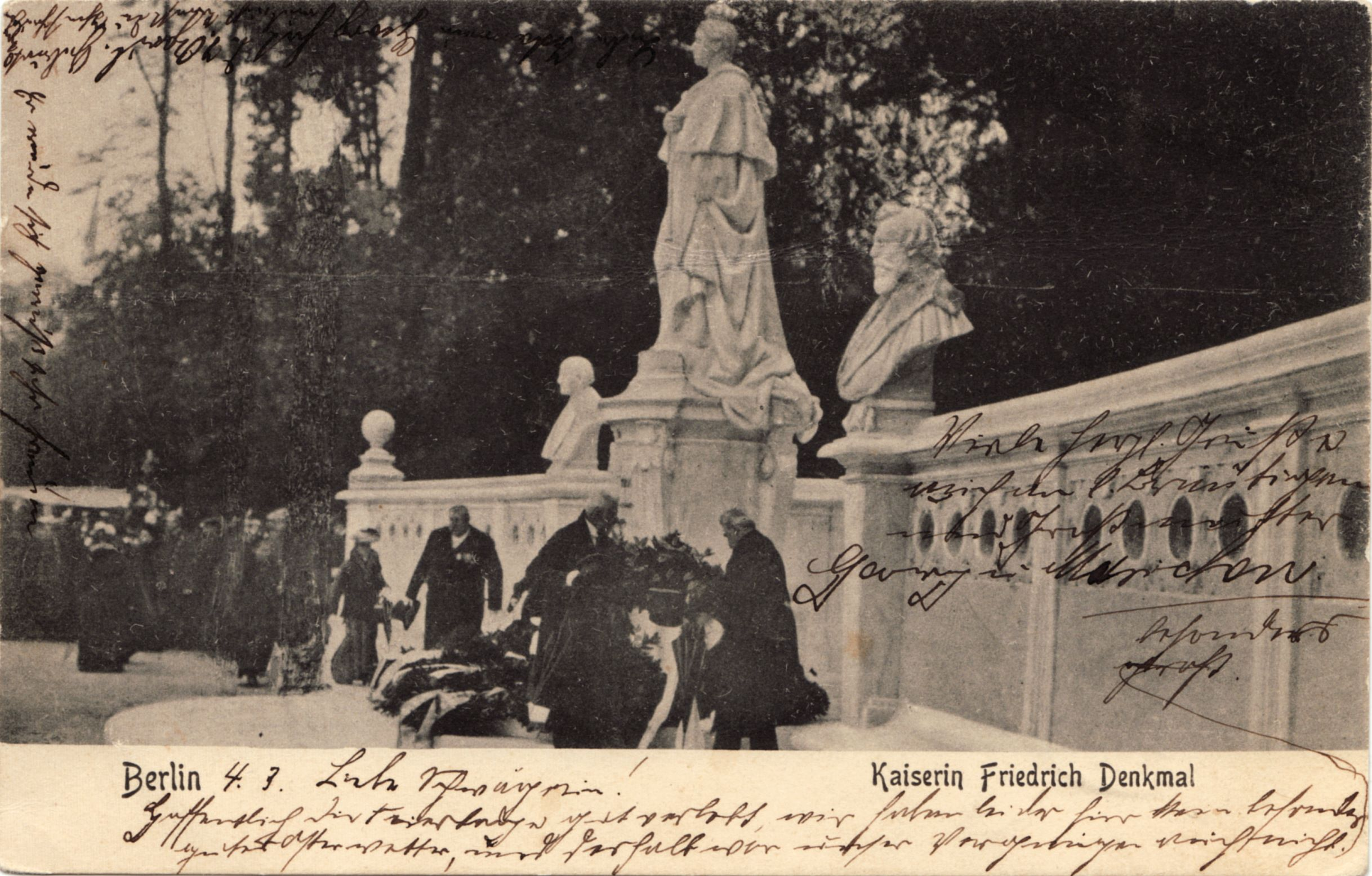
Dedicating the monument to Empress Victoria (postcard, 1903)

Fritz Gerth (24 June 1845, Wiesbaden - 1928, Berlin) was a German sculptor.

== Life and work ==
His father, Johann Julius Gerth, was a medallist and sculptor, who did stone work on the Waterloo Monument in Wiesbaden. He provided Fritz with his initial artistic training. During his stay in Rome from 1875 to 1900, he served as Chairman of the local German Artists' Association. Upon returning to Germany, he settled in Bad Homburg and opened a studio there.

His portrait busts and medallions were displayed at the Summer Exhibitions, held by the Royal Academy of Arts in London, from 1888 to 1892. Among them was a bust of Reverend Charles Langton (1803-1886), which is now at the parish church of St Peter & St Paul in Langton by Spilsby. He also had a major showing at the 50th anniversary exhibition of the Nassauischer Kunstverein Wiesbaden in 1897.

His works include a monument to Princess Elizabeth of the United Kingdom (as Landgravine) in Bad Homburg, the Landesdenkmal (National Monument) in Wiesbaden, and a monument to Kaiser Wilhelm I, also in Bad Homburg. He is, perhaps, best remembered for his monument to Empress Victoria (1903), which was the centerpiece of Group #34 at the Siegesallee. It was one of the many statues there that were lost during World War II.

== Sources ==
- "Gerth, Fritz", In: Allgemeines Lexikon der Bildenden Künstler von der Antike bis zur Gegenwart, Vol. 13: Gaab–Gibus, E. A. Seemann, Leipzig 1920 (Online)
- The Exhibition of the Royal Academy of Arts (Summer Exhibition), 1768– (Mapping the Practice and Profession of Sculpture in Britain and Ireland 1851–1951), University of Glasgow History of Art
- Church of St Peter & St Paul @ the Langton by Spilsby website
- Bildhauer Fritz Gerth @ the Bad Homburg website
