= Sigismund von Götzen =

Prussian diplomat (1576–1650)

Sigismund von Götzen or Sigmundt von Götz (1576–1650) was the Calvinist chancellor of the privy council of George William, Elector of Brandenburg. In 1630, he forced out of office the Roman Catholic Count Adam of Schwarzenberg, who had been in part responsible for the policy of irenicist neutrality that had been pursued by the Margraviate of Brandenburg in the Thirty Years' War. Götzen was one of the two delegates representing Brandenburg in the conference at Leipzig, 1631, where were discussed the terms of a Protestant alliance. The Brandenburgers argued that such an alliance need not violate the imperial constitution under which the Holy Roman Empire was organized, a view that was adopted by the assembled Protestant princes. The colloquy resulted in the Leipzig Manifesto, signed by the princes (12 April 1631), under the terms of which the Protestant defensive association, the Leipziger Bund, formed an army of 40,000 troops "to uphold the basic laws, the imperial constitution, and the German liberties of the Protestant states."
