= Siegesallee =

Street in Berlin, Germany

Coordinates: 52°30′51″N 13°22′15″E

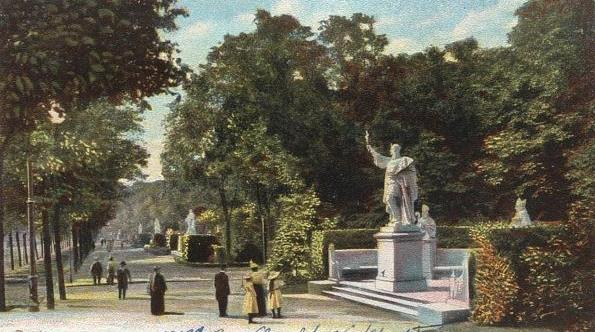
The Siegesallee, from a 1902 postcard. In the foreground is the statue of Albert I of Brandenburg ("Albert the Bear") (1100-1170). This was the northernmost statue on the west side. Other statues can be seen stretching away into the distance.

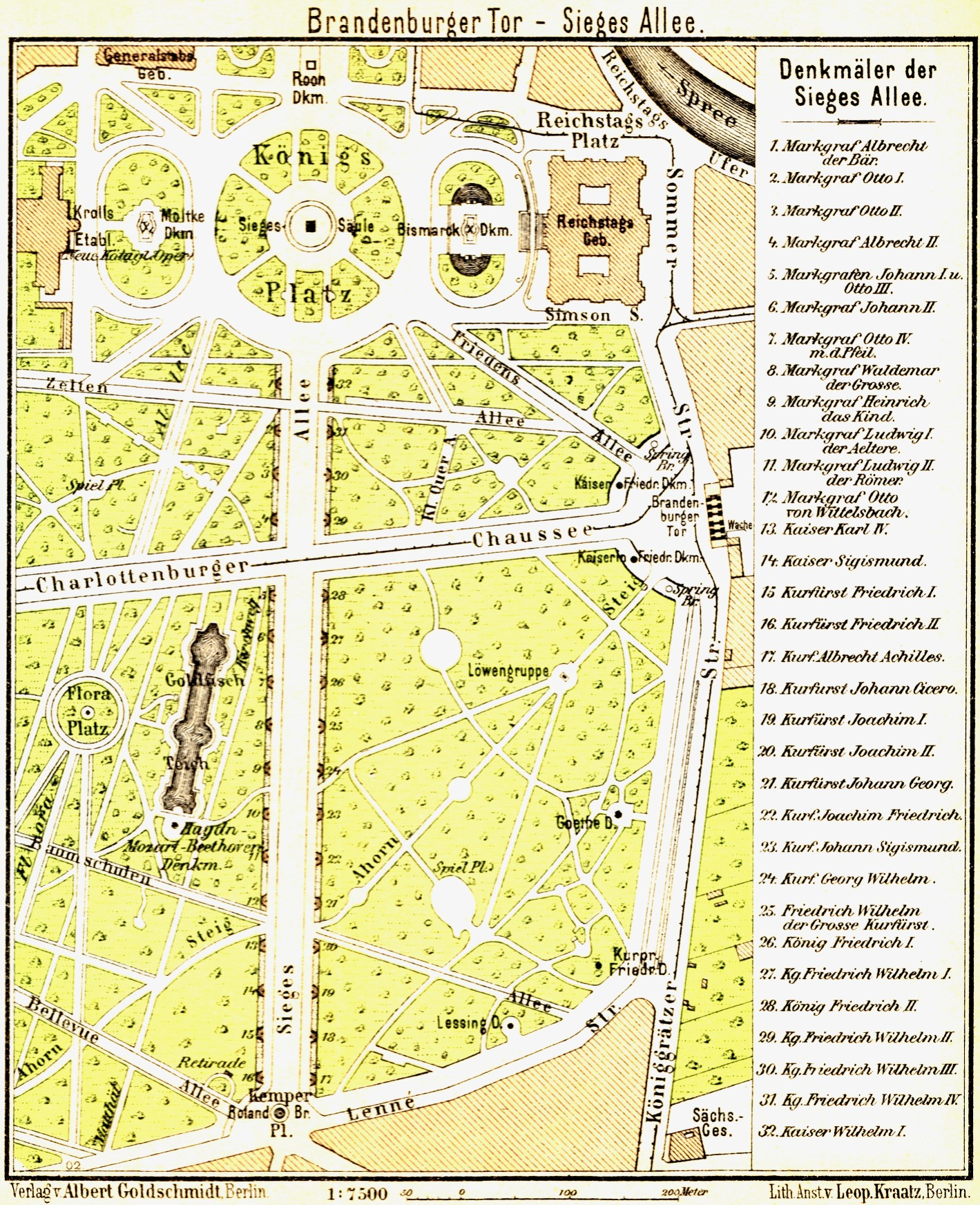
Map of Siegesallee from 1902

The Siegesallee (German: [ˈziːɡəs.aˌleː], Victory Avenue) was a broad boulevard in Berlin, Germany. In 1895, Kaiser Wilhelm II ordered and financed the expansion of an existing avenue, to be adorned with a variety of marble statues. Work was completed in 1901.

About 750m in length, it ran northwards through the Tiergarten park from Kemperplatz (a road junction on the southern edge of the park near Potsdamer Platz), to the former site of the Victory Column at the Königsplatz, close to the Reichstag. Along its length the Siegesallee cut across the Charlottenburger Chaussee (today's Straße des 17. Juni, the main avenue that runs east–west through the park and leads to the Brandenburg Gate).

The marble monuments and the neobaroque ensemble were ridiculed even by its contemporaries. Berlin folklore dubbed the Kaiser Denkmalwilly (Monument Billy) for his excessive historicism. Moves to have the statues demolished were thwarted after the end of the monarchy in 1919.

The Siegessäule and the figures were moved by the Nazi government to the Großer Stern in 1939 to allow for larger military parades.

Some of the monuments were lost in the aftermath of the Second World War. The allied forces (the area later belonged to the British sector) had the avenue erased and the area replanted. In a symbolic act, the Soviet War Memorial (Tiergarten) was deliberately built in its path immediately after the end of the war. The remaining figures were repaired in the Spandau Citadel and some form part of the permanent exhibition Enthüllt – Berlin und seine Denkmäler which opened in April 2016. The avenue was reconstructed as a footpath in 2006.

== History ==
=== Contemporary reaction ===
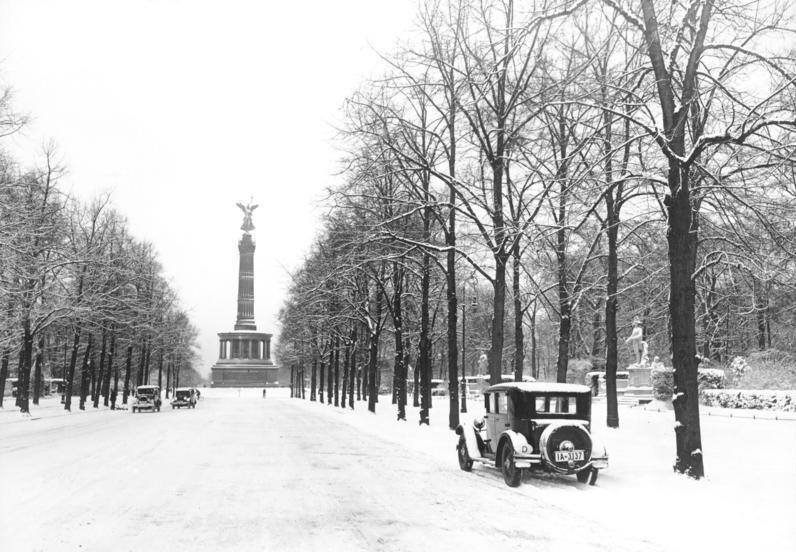
The Siegesallee in late 1933, looking north to the original location of the Victory Column

On 27 January 1895, the 36th birthday of William II, German Emperor (1859–1941), the Siegesallee took on a new meaning with Emperor's commissioning of 96 white marble statues. Intended as a personal gift to the city, supposedly to make it the envy of the world, the statues were created by 27 sculptors under the direction of Reinhold Begas over a period of five years, starting in 1896. Dedicated on 18 December 1901, they consisted firstly of 32 "main" statues, each about 2.75m tall (4 to 5m including their pedestals), of former Prussian royal figures of varying historical importance, in two rows of 16, evenly spaced along either side of the boulevard, while behind each one were two busts of associates or advisors mounted on a low semi-circular wall, making 96 sculptures in all.

The whole construction was widely derided by art critics, and regarded by many Berliners as grossly over-indulgent and a vulgar show of strength. It was dubbed the ″Puppenallee″ (Avenue of the Dolls), as well as the Avenue of the Puppets, Plaster Avenue, and other unsavoury titles. Even the Emperor's own wife Augusta Viktoria (1858–1921), had reportedly been unhappy about it and had tried to persuade him not to go ahead with it, but to no avail. Just one woman was depicted, Elisabeth of Bavaria (″Schöne Else″ or Beautiful Beth) praying on her knees before her husband. The lack of women was noted by contemporaries.

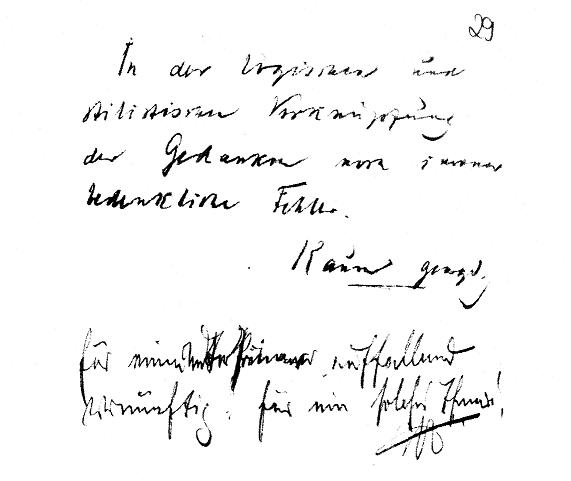
Kaum genügend (just satisfactory, Schroeder) und auffallend vernünftig für ein solch Thema (strikingly reasonable for such a topic Wilhelm II.)

Some of the protests turned on the fact that Italian artisans in Berlin did the actual sculpting while artists of the Berliner Bildhauerschule just provided models in plaster or clay. Wilhelm's opening speech, the infamous Rinnsteinrede, portrayed Modernism and Impressionism as a descent of art into the gutter (Rinnstein).

Karl Scheffler wrote a devastating criticism in 1907, comparing the Siegesallee to an overly patriotic out-of-tune amateur brassband concerto. The Siegesallee was still a popular place to stroll or relax, however.

The figures were used to teach the history of Brandenburg to pupils. A series of essays by the pupils of a prestigious school, the Joachimsthalsches Gymnasium, reached the Kaiser. On behalf of Professor Otto Schroeder, the pupils had to interpret the contrapposto—the leg position of the marble leaders, and from that deduce their personalities. The Kaiser gave better marks than the teacher and provided some ironic notes. The whole affair was made public in 1960 by an East German writer, Rudolf Herrnstadt under a pseudonym.

== After the monarchy ==
In 1918 and 1919, among other occasions, Hans Paasche asked to have the statues destroyed. The soldiers' and workers' council of Berlin decided to keep them. Kurt Tucholsky had written a poem, asking to keep the figures silent, as monuments of a great era.

The statues remained in place until 1938, when they got in the way of the grand plan by Adolf Hitler to transform Berlin into the Welthauptstadt Germania, to be realised by Albert Speer. The avenue was set to disappear under the new North-South Axis, the linchpin of the plan, and so on Speer's direction the entire construction was dismantled and rebuilt in another part of the Tiergarten, along a south-east to north-west running avenue called ″Großer Sternallee″ that led to the Großer Stern (literally ″Large Star″) itself, the main intersection of roads in the centre of the Tiergarten, one of the other roads being the Charlottenburger Chaussee. In its new location it was given a new name — ″Neue Siegesallee″ (New Victory Avenue). The Victory Column was also moved, to the middle of the Großer Stern (and increased in height in the process), where it remains to this day.

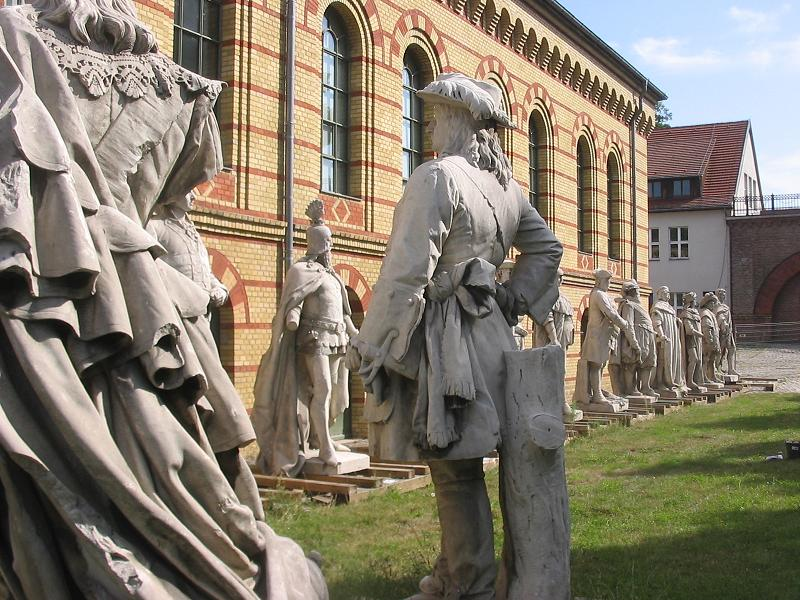
Statues in the Spandau Citadel, August 2009

Many of the statues were damaged in World War II, while a few were smashed completely. Generally though, the avenue survived, more or less, while all around was a scene of devastation. Most of the Tiergarten's 200,000 trees were shattered by bombs and artillery shells and finally cut down for fuel by desperate Berliners. In the 1948 movie The Ballad of Berlin "Berliner Ballade" (film), Otto Normalverbraucher (″Otto Average-Consumer″), played by Gert Fröbe, as a former German soldier returning to civilian life, gives an ironic salute to the figures.

However, the statues were seen by the Allied powers as a symbol of Imperial Germany, and in 1947 the British Occupation Forces dismantled the Siegesallee remains, these apparently being bound for the Teufelsberg (Devil's Mountain), the largest of the eight huge rubble mountains around Berlin's perimeter.

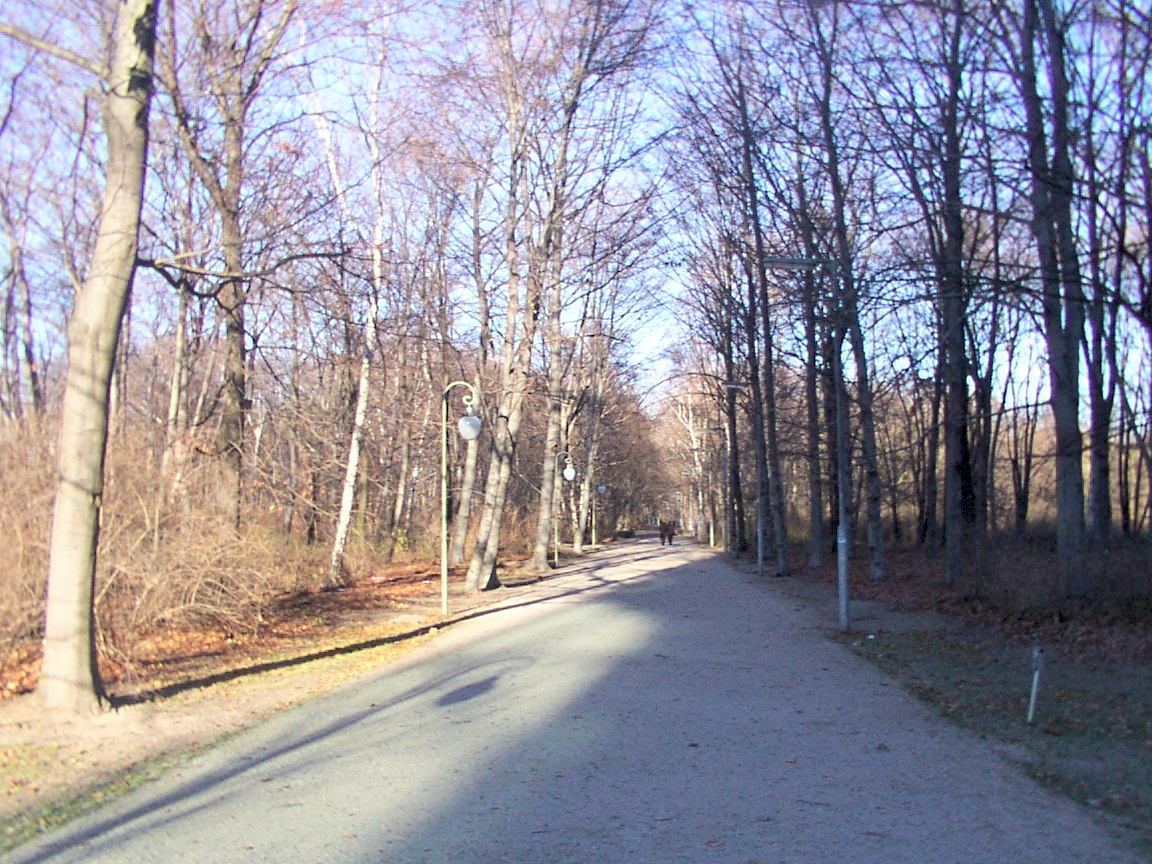
The original route of the Siegesallee in December 2003

State curator Hinnerk Schaper intervened, however, and buried most of the statues in the grounds of the nearby Schloss Bellevue, today the official residence of the Federal President of Germany, in the hope that one day, when Germany could be more accepting of monuments to its past, they might resurface. In 1979 they were rediscovered and disinterred, and many of the survivors were relocated to a museum called the Lapidarium, at Hallesches Ufer, on the north bank of the Landwehrkanal, near the site of the former Anhalter Bahnhof. The museum had formerly been Berlin's first sewage pumping station. In October 2006, however, the museum closed. The building was put up for sale, and the remaining 26 Siegesallee statues and 40 sidebusts (and numerous others housed there) were moved in May 2009 to the Spandau Citadel.

== Sculptors who worked on the project ==
- Max Baumbach
- Karl Begas
- Reinhold Begas
- Eugen Boermel
- Johannes Boese
- Peter Breuer
- Adolf Brütt
- Alexander Calandrelli
- Ludwig Cauer
- Gustav Eberlein
- Reinhold Felderhoff
- Fritz Gerth
- Johannes Götz
- Ernst Herter
- August Kraus
- Otto Lessing
- Harro Magnussen
- Albert Manthe
- Ludwig Manzel
- Norbert Pfretzschner
- Fritz Schaper
- Emil von Schlitz
- Walter Schott
- Rudolf Siemering
- Cuno von Uechtritz-Steinkirch
- Max Unger
- Joseph Uphues
- Martin Wolff

== See also ==
- Wilhelminism
