= Berlin Palace =

Current seat of the Humboldt Forum and former residence of the Kings of Prussia

- Berliner Schloss
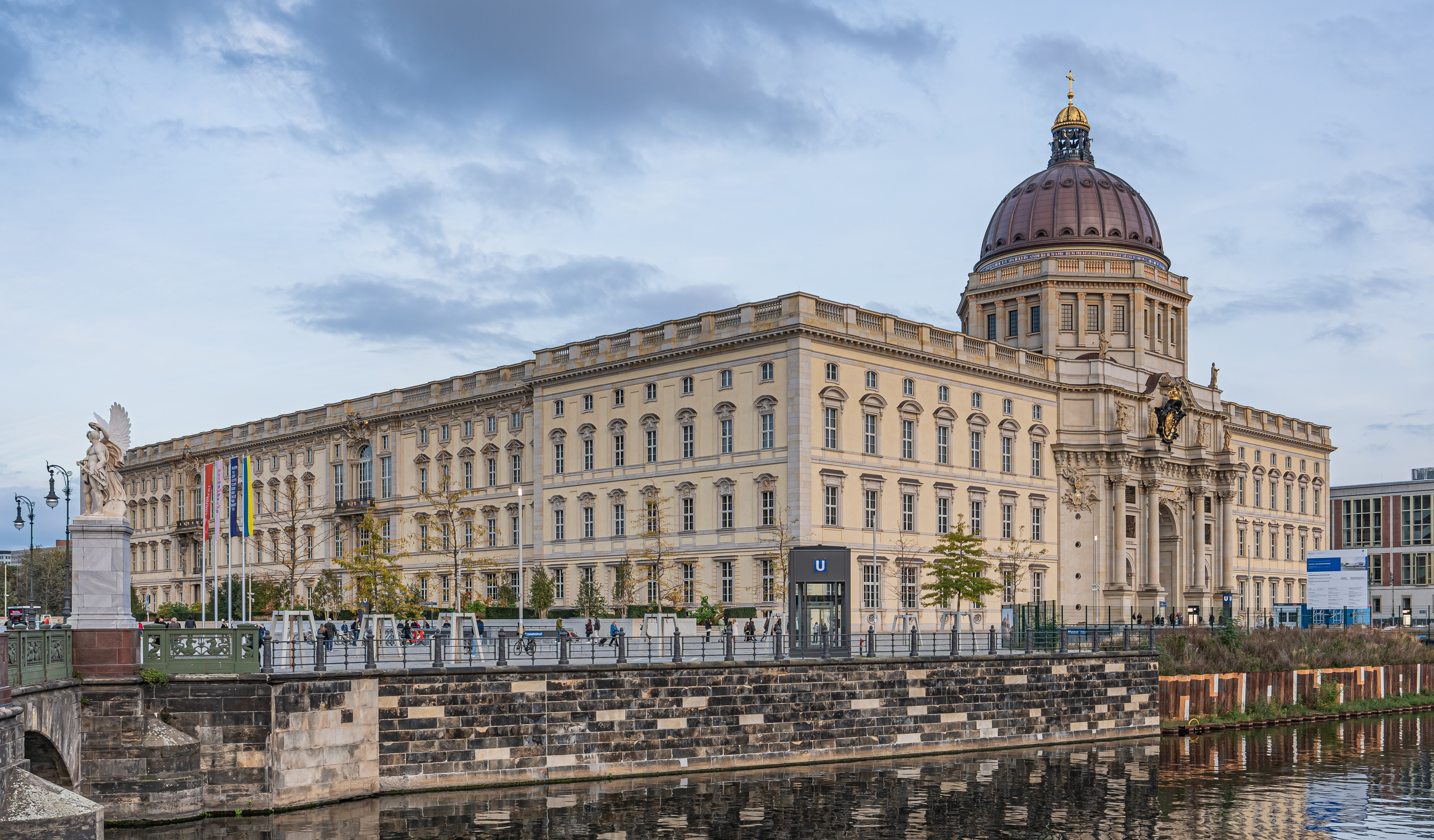
- The north and west façades of the reconstructed Berlin Palace. Completed in 2020, the palace now houses the Humboldt Forum museum.

General information
- Status: Rebuilt
- Architectural style: Baroque
- Location: Berlin (Mitte), Germany
- Coordinates: 52°31′03″N 13°24′10″E
- Construction started: 1443 (original); 2013 (reconstruction)
- Completed: 1894 (original); 2020 (reconstruction)
- Demolished: 1950 (original; by East German authorities) (Note: Initially damaged by Allied bombing in 1945)
- Client: Electors of Brandenburg; Kings of Prussia; German Emperors

Design and construction
- Architects: Andreas Schlüter (original); Franco Stella (reconstruction)

Website
- https://www.humboldtforum.org/en/

The Berlin Palace (German: Berliner Schloss), formerly known as the Royal Palace (German: Königliches Schloss), is a large building adjacent to Berlin Cathedral and the Museum Island in the Mitte area of Berlin. It was the main residence of the Electors of Brandenburg, Kings of Prussia and German Emperors from 1443 to 1918. Expanded by order of Frederick I of Prussia according to plans by Andreas Schlüter from 1689 to 1713, it was thereafter considered a major work of Prussian Baroque architecture. The royal palace became one of Berlin’s largest buildings and shaped the cityscape with its 60-meter-high (200 ft) dome erected in 1845.

Used for various government functions after the abolition of the Hohenzollern monarchy in the 1918 revolution, the palace was damaged during the Allied bombing in World War II, and was razed to the ground by the East German authorities in 1950. In the 1970s, the East German authorities erected a modernist parliamentary and cultural center on the site, known as the Palace of the Republic. After German reunification in 1990, and years of debate, particularly regarding the fraught historical legacy of both buildings, the Palace of the Republic was itself demolished in 2009.

Most of the Berlin Palace's exterior was reconstructed beginning in 2013 to house the Humboldt Forum museum. The east façade of the reconstructed palace incorporates a modernist design, while the new interior combines both historicist and modernist elements. Architect Franco Stella oversaw the project and the exterior reconstruction was completed in 2020, with the last decoration being mounted in 2025. The palace is now again among the largest in the world.

== Overview ==
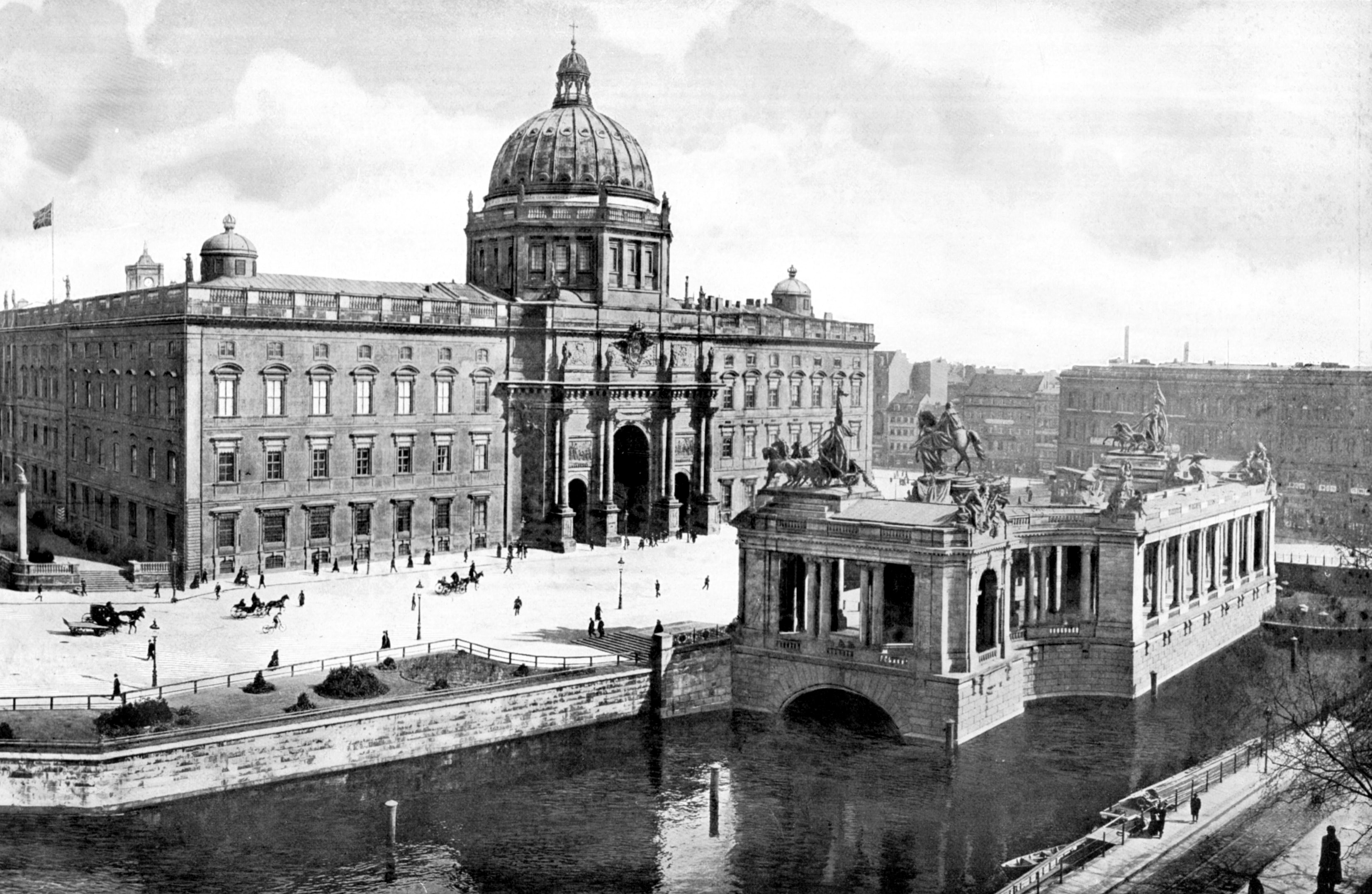
The Berlin Palace (left) with the National Kaiser Wilhelm Monument to Wilhelm I (destroyed 1950), c. 1900

The palace was originally built in the 15th century, but had changed in form throughout the next few centuries. It bears features of the Baroque style; its shape, which had been finalized by the mid-18th century, is for the most part attributed to German architect Andreas Schlüter, whose first design is likely to date from 1702, even though the palace incorporated earlier Renaissance parts as seen in 1688 by Nicodemus Tessin the Younger. It was the principal residence and winter residence of the Hohenzollern kings of Prussia from 1701 to 1918. After the unification of Germany in 1871, it also became the central residence for the German Emperors, who also served as the kings of Prussia. After the proclamation of the Weimar Republic in 1918, the palace became a museum. In World War II, the building was heavily damaged by Allied bombing. Although it is thought to have been repairable, the palace was demolished in 1950 by the East German authorities following much criticism. In the 1970s, the Palace of the Republic was constructed on its site. After controversial public discussions, in 2002 the Bundestag decided to demolish the Palace of the Republic in order to make place for a partial reconstruction of the Berlin Palace.

Located on Spree Island, the plans envisaged the reconstruction of three sides of the palace exterior in the original style, initially without the National Kaiser Wilhelm Monument at the west front facing the river Spree, and a modernist façade facing the other branch of the Spree. The identically reconstructed facades include various remnant sculptures and stones of the original palace. The inner courtyard facades are also modern, except three facades of the main courtyard which was originally built in 1699 (Schlüterhof). The floorplan has been designed to allow future reconstruction of notable historical rooms. Part of the building houses the Humboldt Forum museum and congress complex, and was finished in 2020.

== History ==
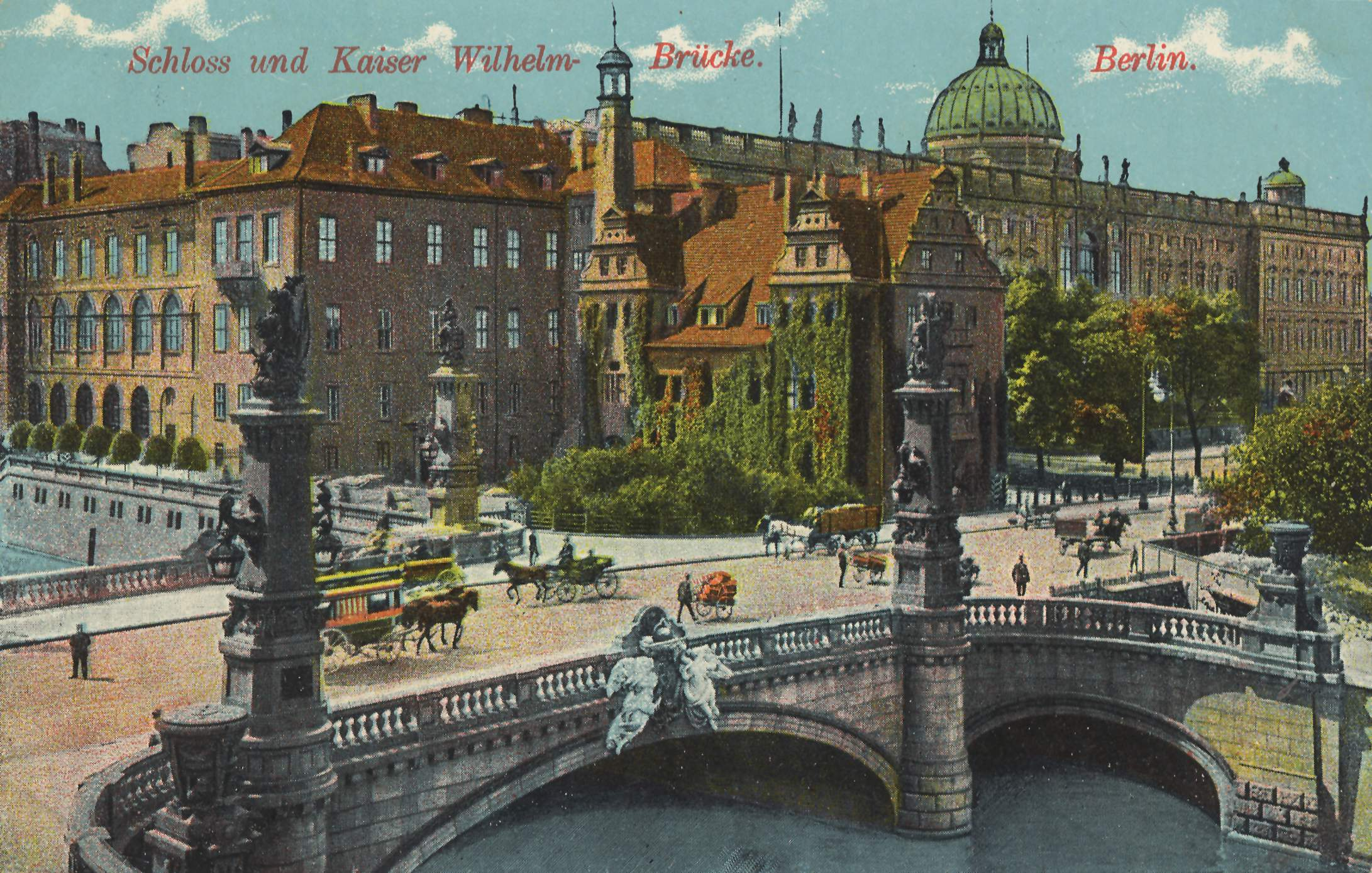
The Berlin Palace with the Pharmacy Wing and the Spree side, c. 1900

=== History up to 1871 ===
The palace replaced an earlier fort or castle guarding the crossing of the Spree at Cölln, a neighbouring town which merged with Berlin in 1710. The castle stood on Fishers' Island, as the southern end of the Museum Island in the Spree is known. In 1443 Frederick II "Irontooth", Margrave and Prince Elector of Brandenburg, laid the foundations of Berlin's first fortification in a section of swampy wasteland north of Cölln. At the completion of the castle in 1451, Frederick moved there from the town of Brandenburg. The main role of the castle and its garrison in this period was to establish the authority of the margraves over the unruly citizens of Berlin, who were reluctant to give up their medieval privileges to a monarchy. In 1415 King Sigismund had enfeoffed the Hohenzollern princes with Brandenburg, and they were now establishing their power and withdrawing privileges which the cities had attained in the Brandenburg interregnum of 1319–1415.

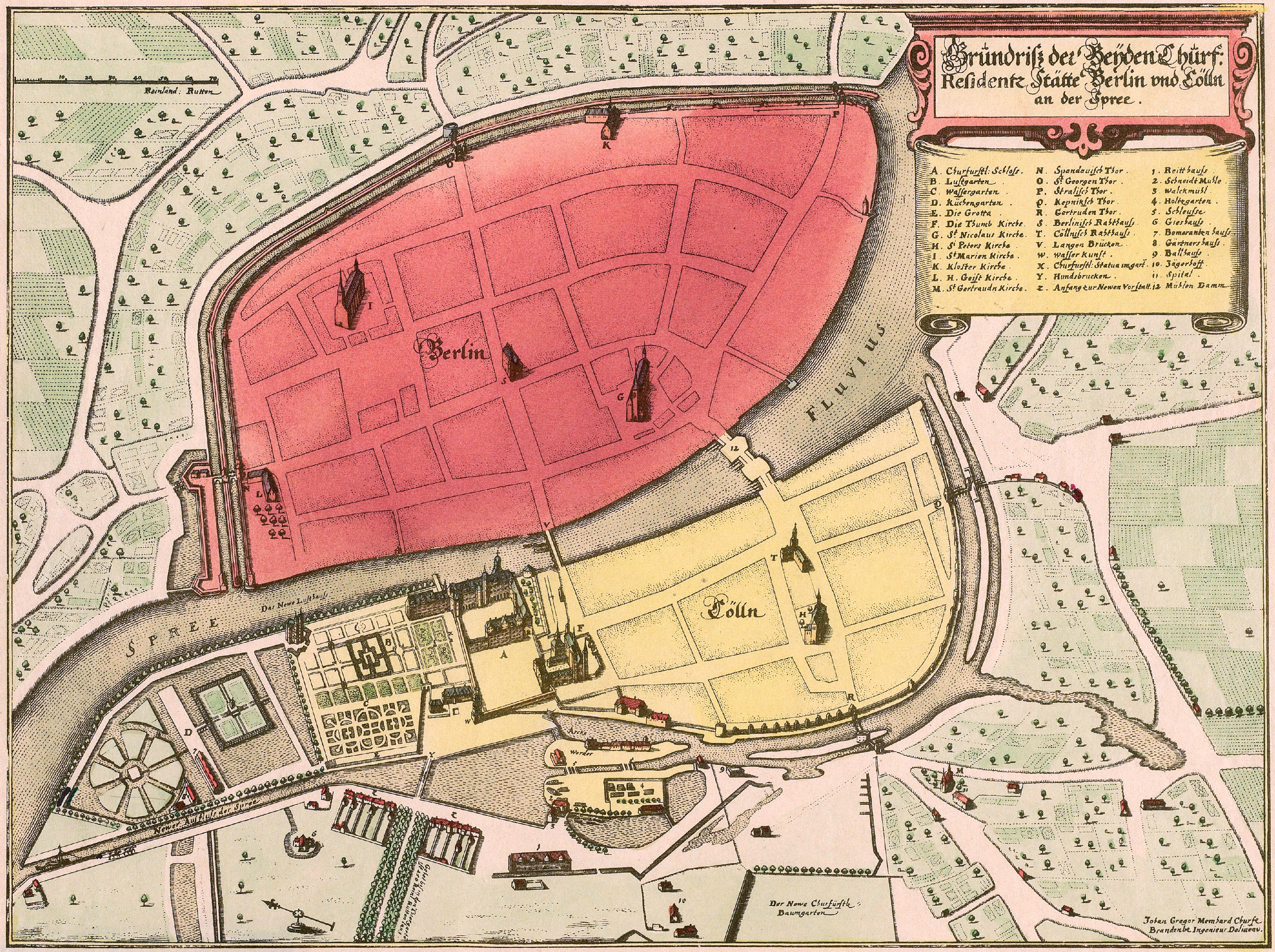
The Berlin Palace (letter A) on the Memhardt-Plan, 1652

In 1454 Frederick II, after having returned via Rome from his pilgrimage to Jerusalem, made the castle chapel a parish church, richly endowing it with relics and altars. Pope Nicholas V ordered Stephan Bodecker, then Prince-Bishop of Brandenburg, to consecrate the chapel to Erasmus of Formiae. On 7 April 1465, at Frederick's request, Pope Paul II attributed to St. Erasmus Chapel a canon law College named Stift zu Ehren Unserer Lieben Frauen, des heiligen Kreuzes, St. Petri und Pauli, St. Erasmi und St. Nicolai. This collegiate church became the nucleus of today's Evangelical Supreme Parish and Collegiate Church (Berliner Dom (Berlin Cathedral)), adjoining the site of the castle.

In 1538, the Elector Joachim II demolished the castle and engaged the master builder Caspar Theiss to build a new and grander palace in the Italian Renaissance style. The plans were made by his teacher Konrad Krebs, similar to the castle in Torgau, which he also designed. Toward the end of the 16th century Rochus Graf zu Lynar designed the Pharmacy Wing. After the Thirty Years War (1618–1648), Frederick William, the "Great Elector", embellished the palace further. In 1688, Nicodemus Tessin the Younger designed courtyard arcades with massive columns in front. Not much is known about the alterations of 1690–1695, when Johann Arnold Nering was the court architect. Martin Grünberg continued the alterations in 1695–1699.

In 1699, the Elector Frederick III of Brandenburg (who took the title King in Prussia in 1701, becoming Frederick I), appointed the architect Andreas Schlüter to execute a "second plan" in the Italian manner. Schlüter's first design probably dates from 1702; he planned to rebuild the palace in the Protestant Baroque style. His overall concept in the shape of a regular cube enclosing a magnificently ornamented courtyard was retained by all the building directors who succeeded him. In 1706, Schlüter was replaced by Johann Friedrich Eosander von Göthe, who designed the western extension of the palace, doubling its size. In all essentials, Schlüter's balanced, rhythmic composition of the façades was retained, but Göthe moved the main entrance to the new west wing.

Frederick William I, who became king in 1713, was interested mainly in building up Prussia as a military power, and dismissed most of the craftsmen working on the palace. As a result, Göthe's plan was only partly carried out. The palace was the original location for the Amber Room in the Catherine Palace of Tsarskoye Selo near Saint Petersburg, but Peter the Great of Russia admired it during a visit, and in 1716 Frederick William I presented the room to Peter as a gift. Nevertheless, the exterior of the palace had come close to its final form by the mid-18th century. Interior decoration continued, engaging the talents of Georg Wenzeslaus von Knobelsdorff, Carl von Gontard and many others. The final stage was the erection of the dome with a palace chapel in 1845, during the reign of Frederick William IV. The dome was built by Friedrich August Stüler after a design by Karl Friedrich Schinkel.

The palace was itself the epicenter of the Revolution of 1848 in Prussia. Huge crowds gathered outside the palace to present an "address to the king" containing their demands for a constitution, liberal reform and German unification. Frederick William IV emerged from the palace to accept their demands. On 18 March, a large demonstration outside the palace led to bloodshed and the outbreak of street fighting. Frederick William later reneged on his promises and reimposed an autocratic regime. From that time onwards, many Berliners and other Germans came to see the palace as a symbol of oppression and "Prussian militarism".

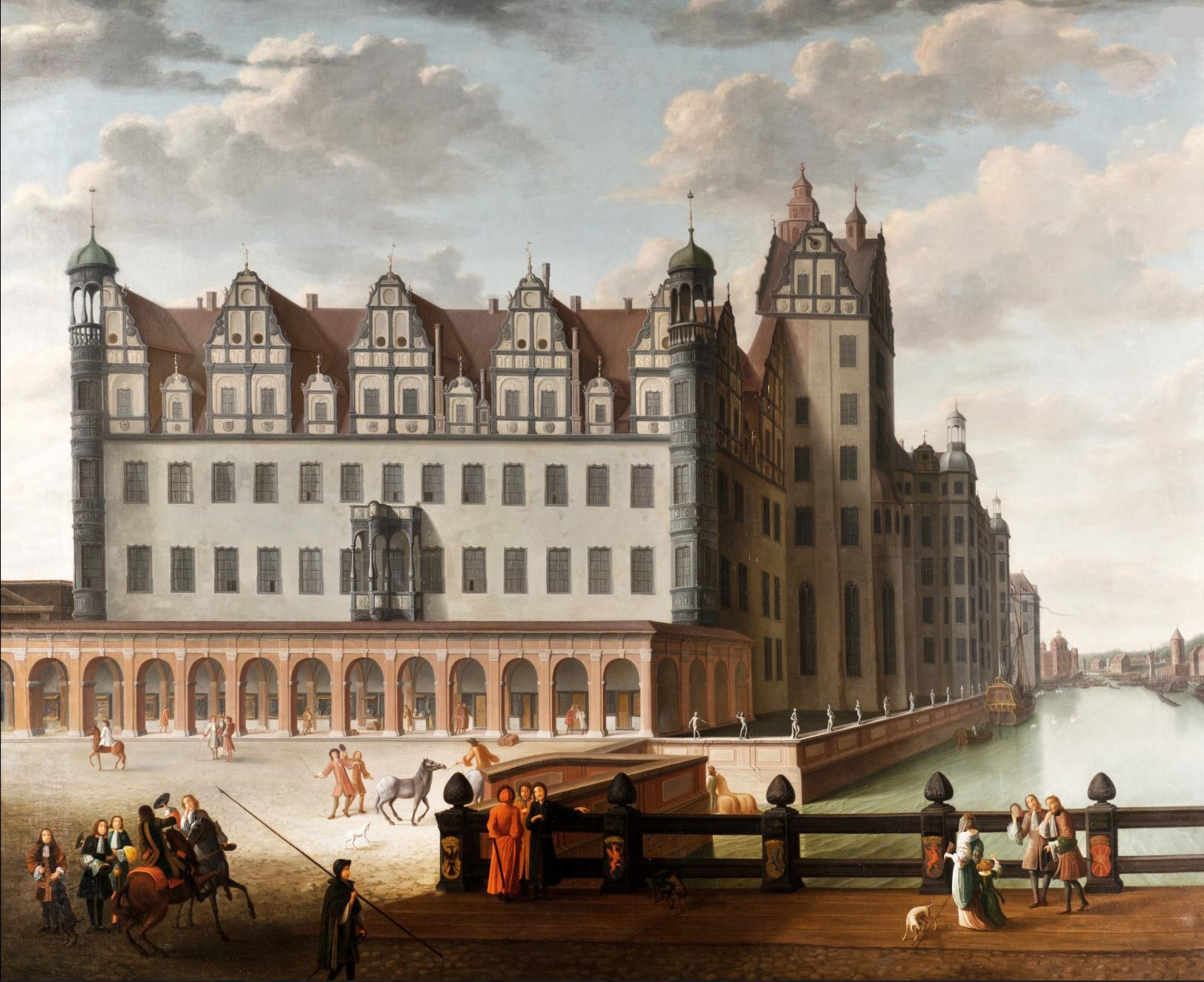
The Renaissance residence (palace) in the 17th century (as painted by Abraham Begeyn)

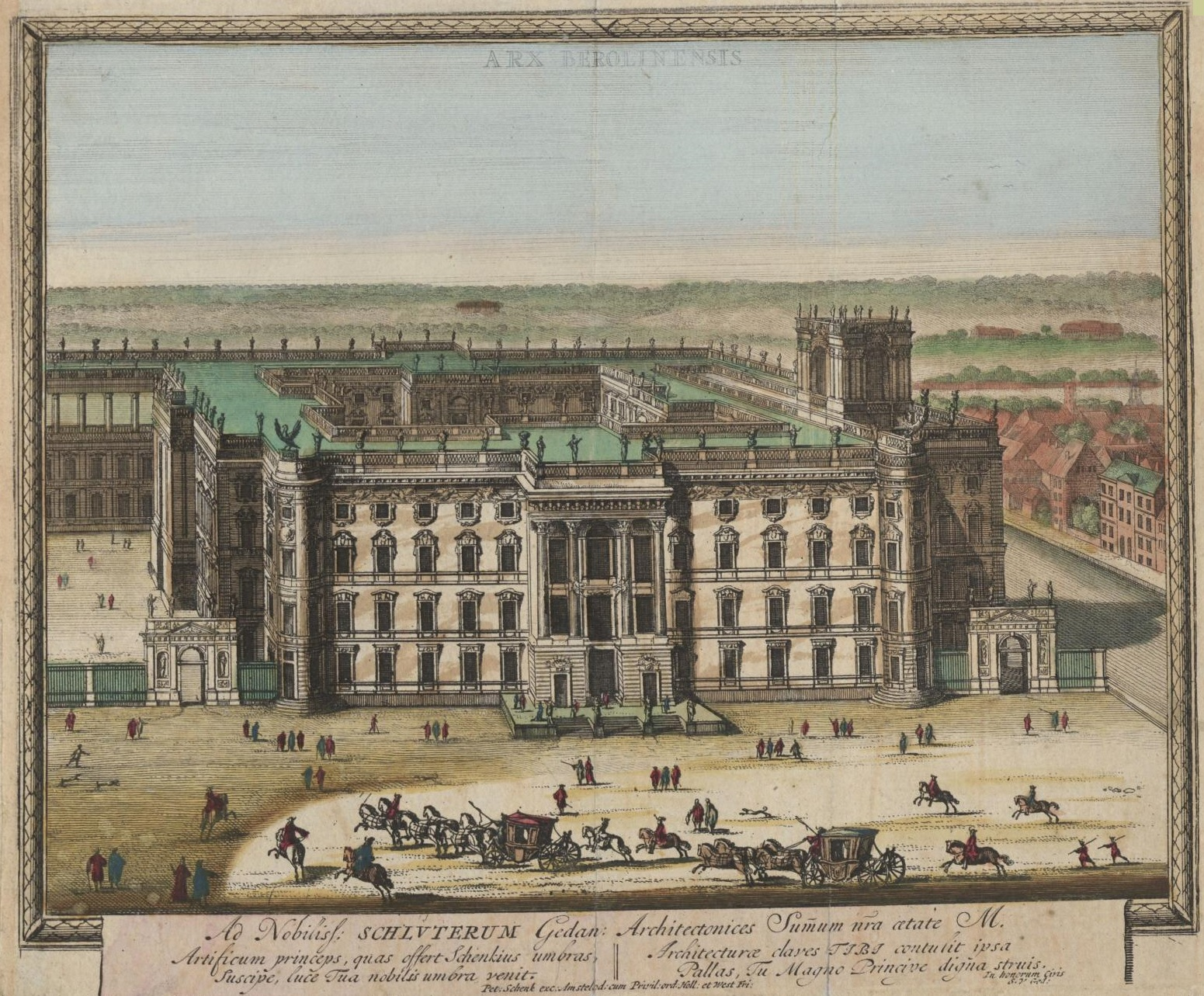
A draft for the redesign based on plans by A. Schlüter, depicted by Schenk, 1702

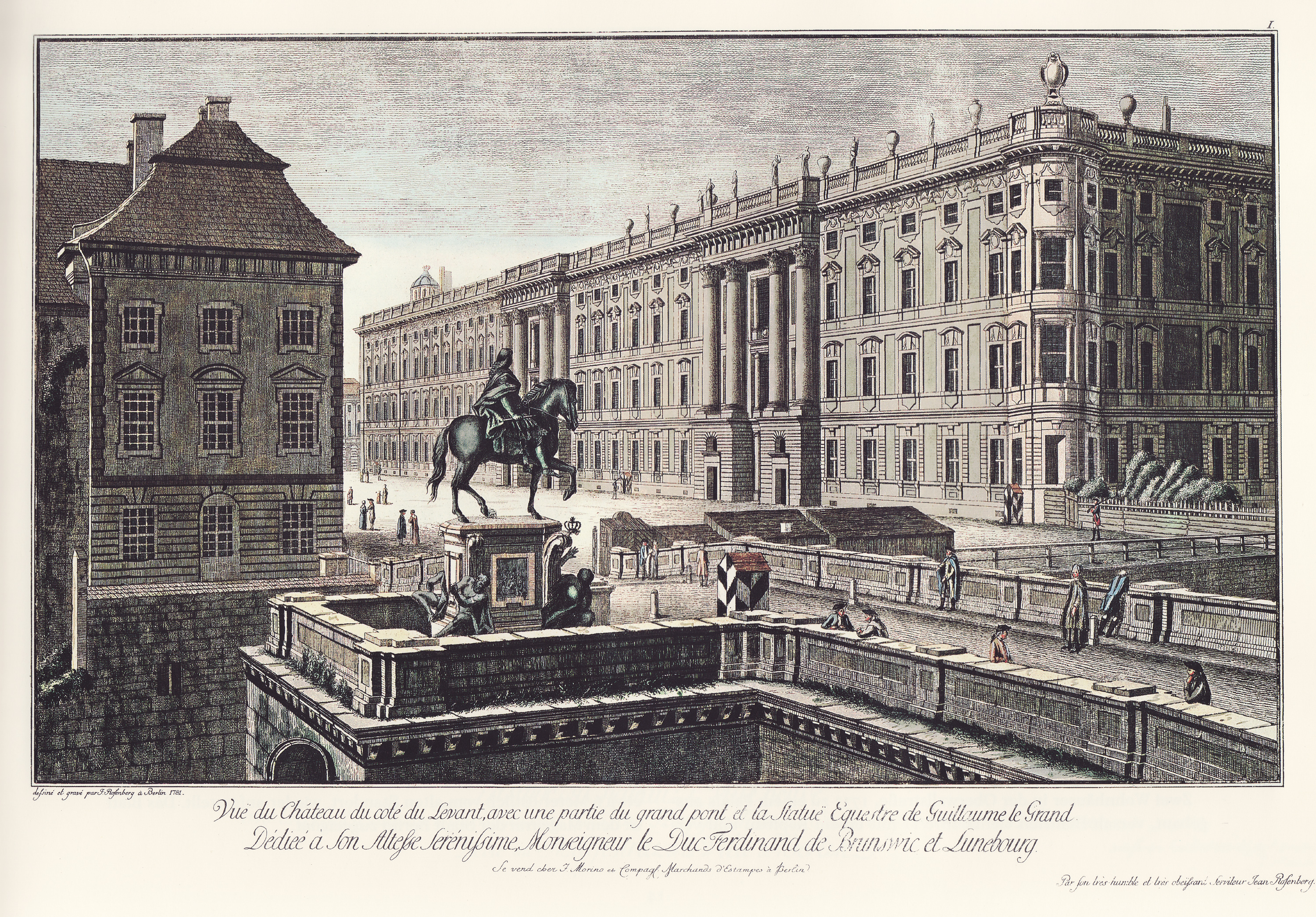
The partially redesigned residence and the Equestrian statue of Friedrich Wilhelm I, 1781

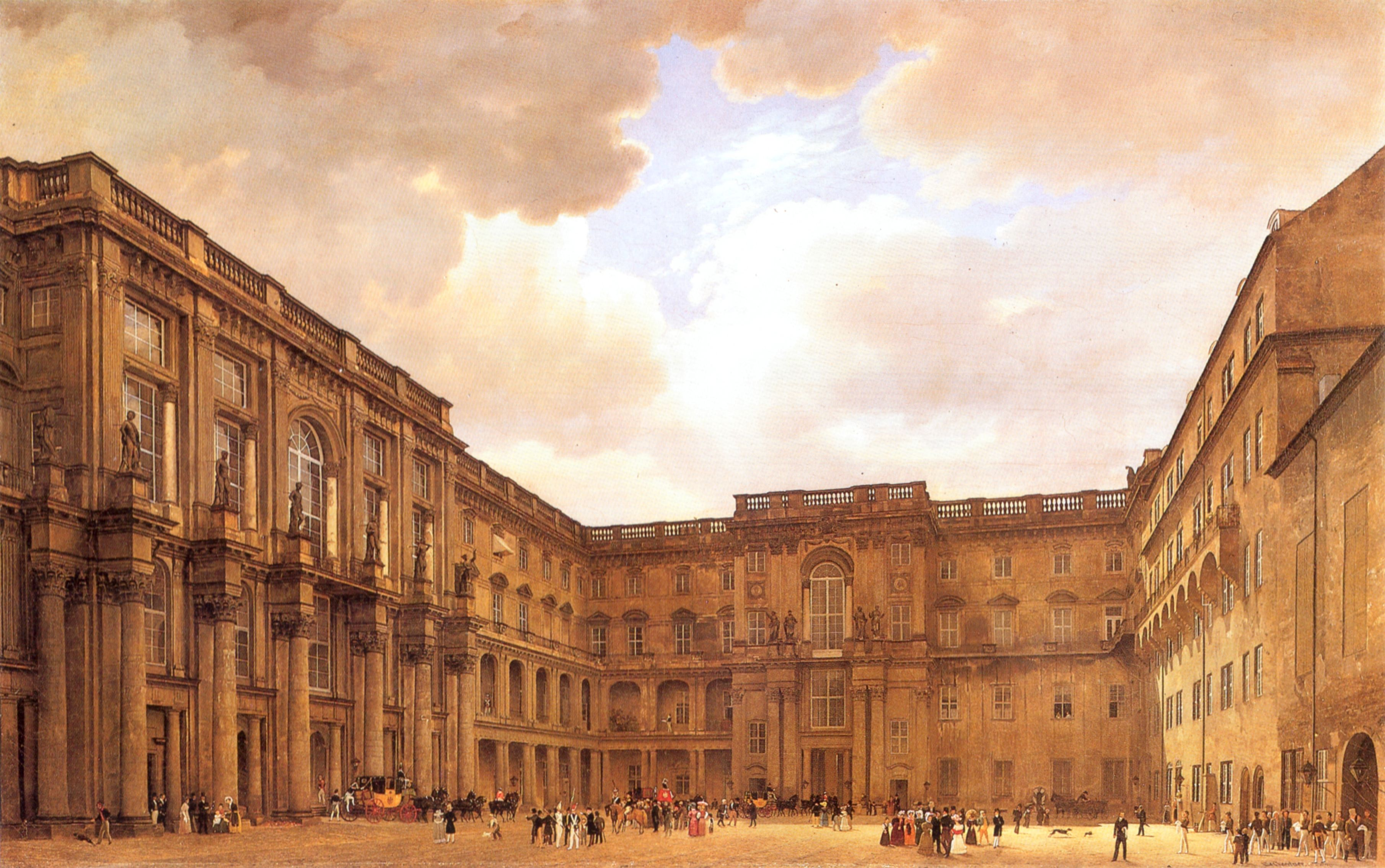
The Baroque Schlüterhof, interior courtyard of the palace (painting by Gaertner, 1830)

=== History during the German Empire, Weimar Republic and National Socialist Era (1871–1945) ===
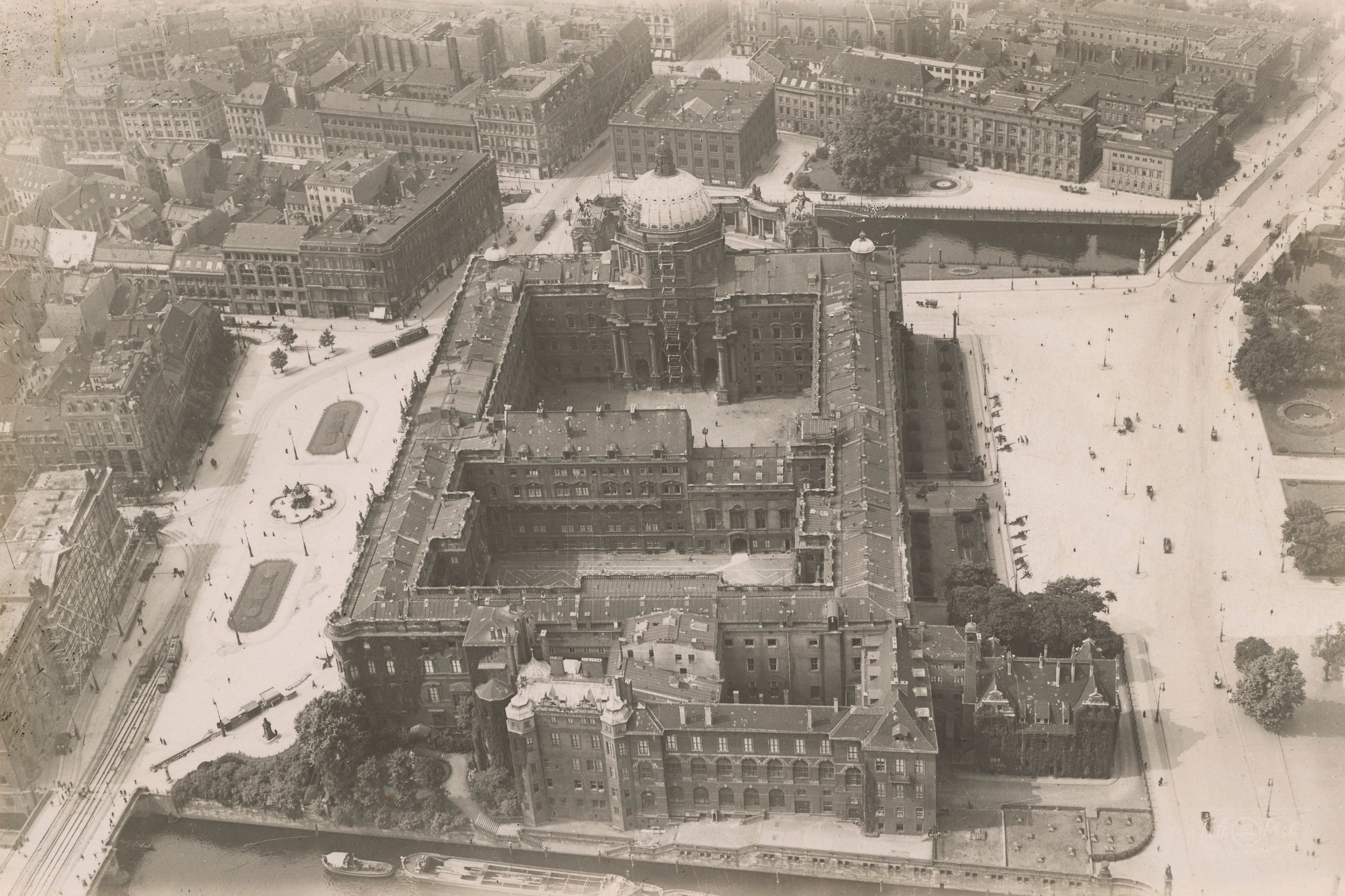
Aerial photo, c. 1920

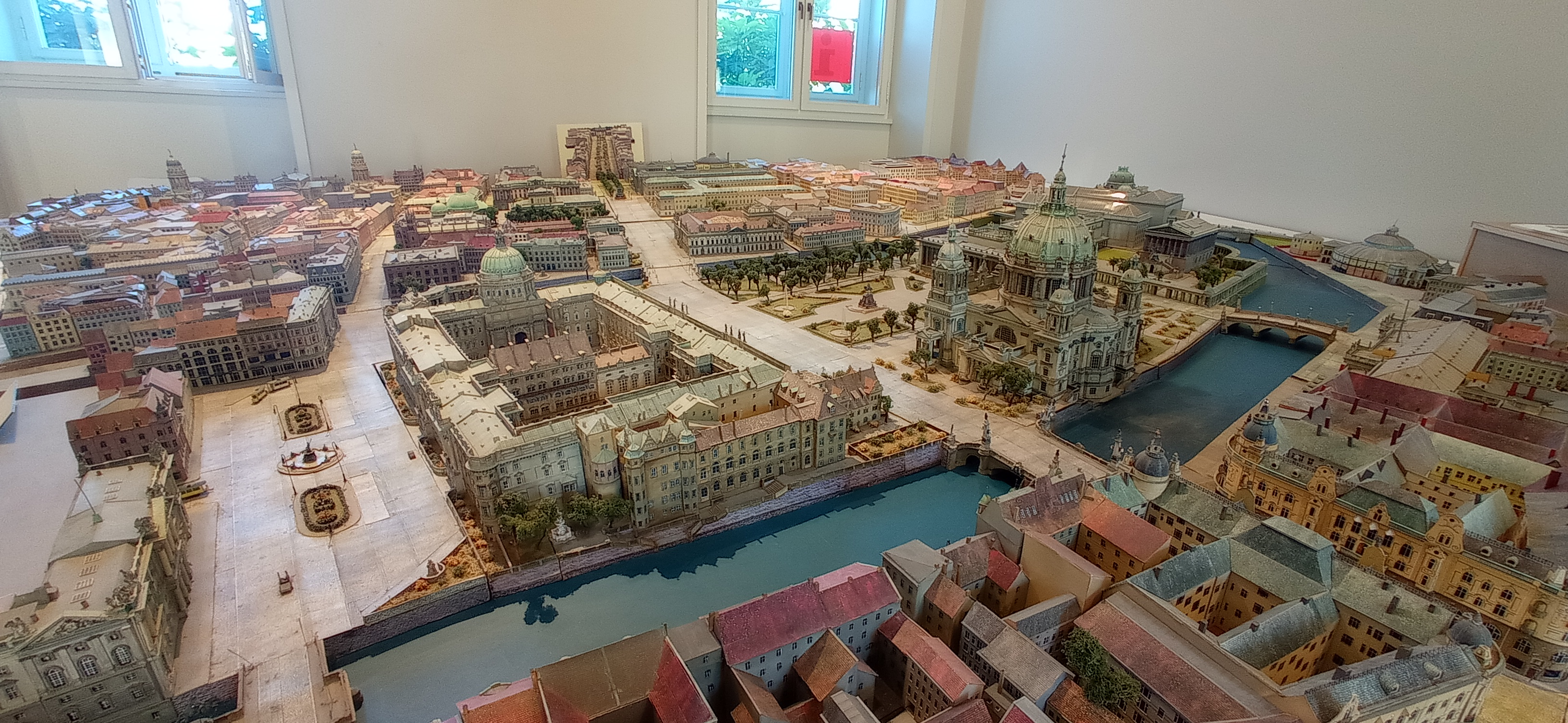
City model in the tourist information room next to Schlüterhof: the palace at center with the cathedral at right.

In 1871, King Wilhelm I was elevated to the status of German Emperor (Kaiser) of a united Germany, and the palace became the symbolic heart of the German Empire. The Empire was (in theory) a constitutional state, and from 1894 onwards, the new Reichstag building, the seat of the German parliament, came to not only rival, but overshadow the palace as the Empire's centre of power. In conjunction with Germany's defeat in World War I, Kaiser Wilhelm II was forced to abdicate, both as German Emperor and as King of Prussia.

In November 1918, during the immediate vacuum of power following the abdication of the Kaiser, Spartacist leader Karl Liebknecht declared a German socialist republic from a balcony of the palace. It was an attempt to steer the German revolution towards a communist Germany and stood in contrast to the proclamation of a republic that Philipp Scheidemann of the Social Democratic Party had made a few hours earlier from a balcony of the Reichstag building. The duelling proclamations underscored that the more than 400 years of royal Hohenzollern occupation of the Berlin Palace had come to an end.

During the Weimar Republic, parts of the palace were turned into a museum, while other parts continued to be used for receptions and other state functions. Under Adolf Hitler's National Socialist (Nazi) Party, which laid to rest monarchist hopes of a Hohenzollern restoration, the building was mostly ignored. During World War II, the palace was twice struck by Allied bombs: on 3 and 24 February 1945. On the latter occasion, when both the air defences and fire-fighting systems of Berlin had been destroyed, the building was struck by incendiaries, lost its roof, and was largely burnt out.

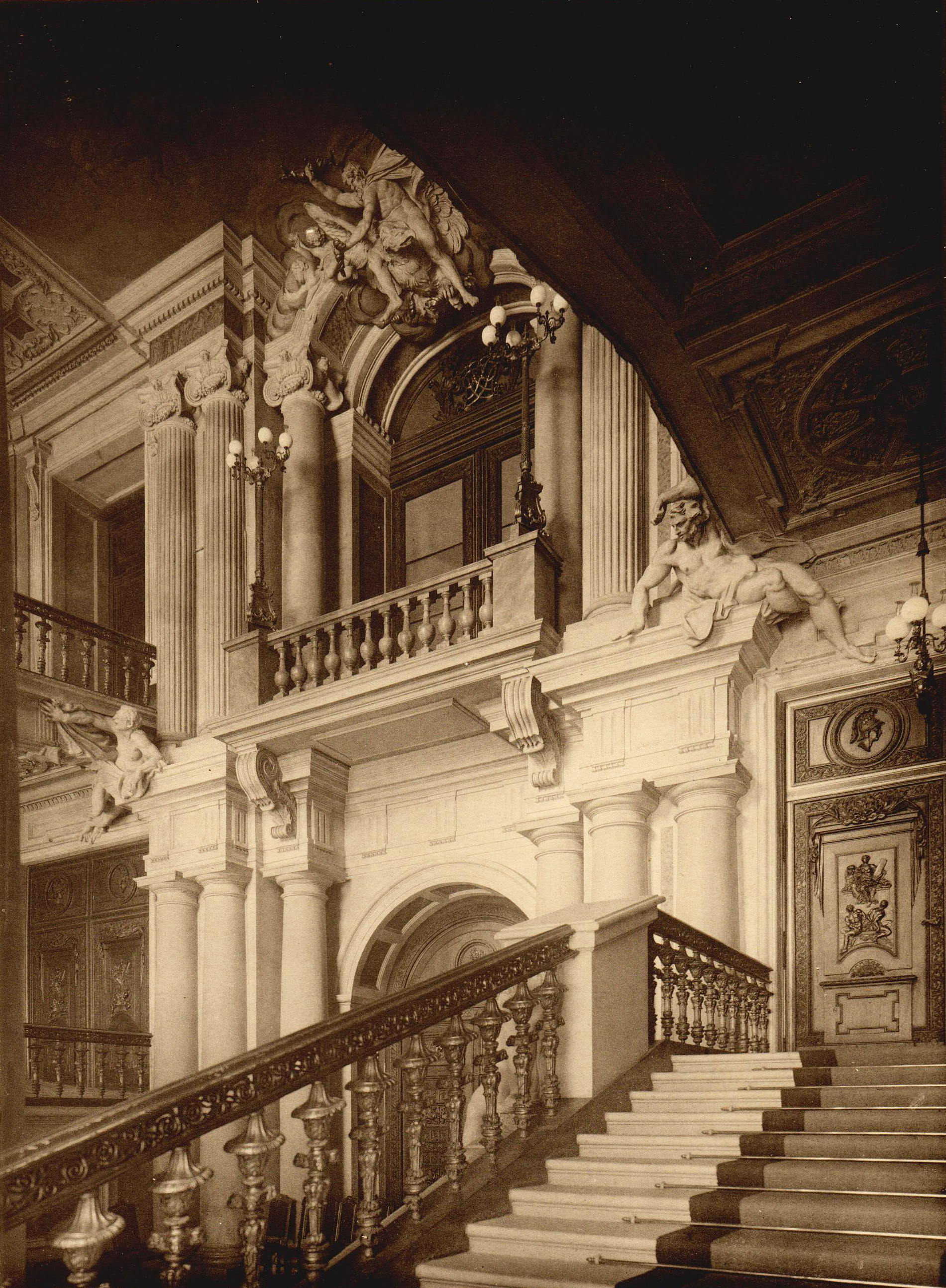
Grand Staircase, the palace's ceremonial entrance from Schlüterhof

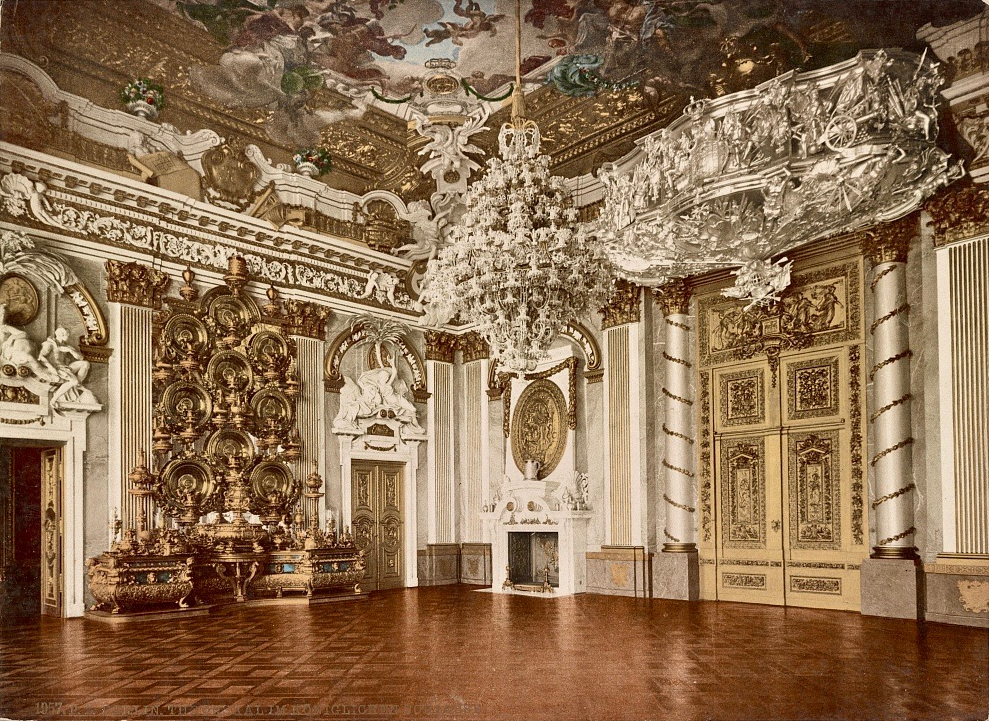
Knights' Hall viewed towards the Grand Staircase, c. 1900

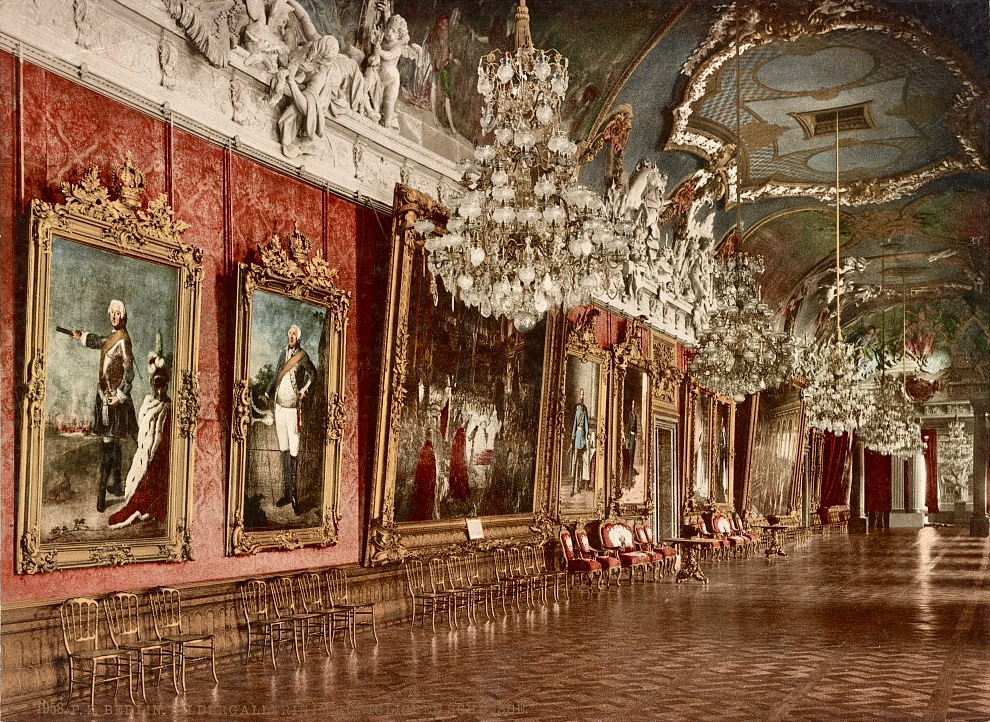
Picture Gallery viewed towards the White Hall, c. 1900

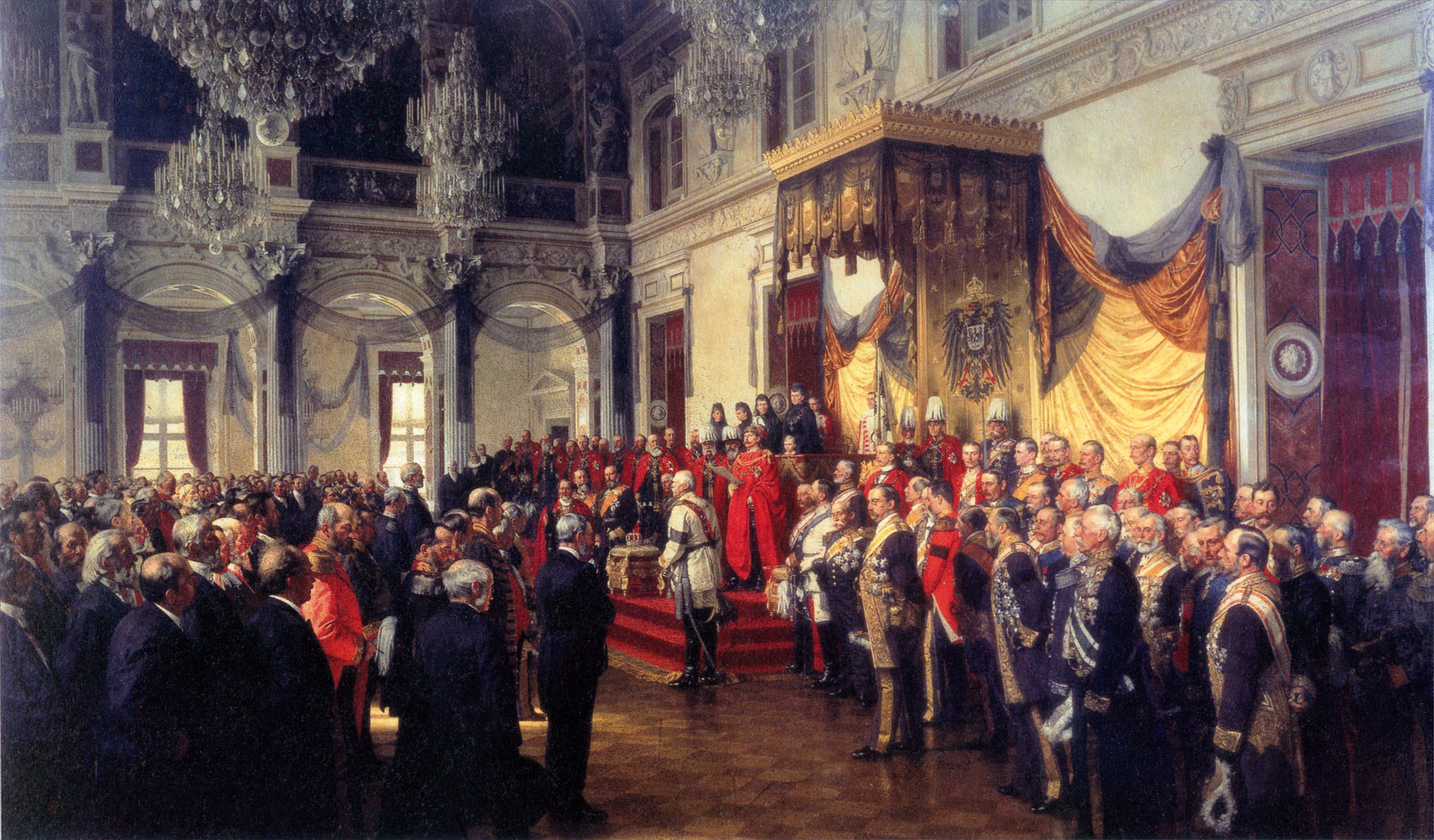
Emperor Wilhelm II opening the Reichstag in the White Hall of the Berlin Palace, 1888 (painting by Anton von Werner, 1893)

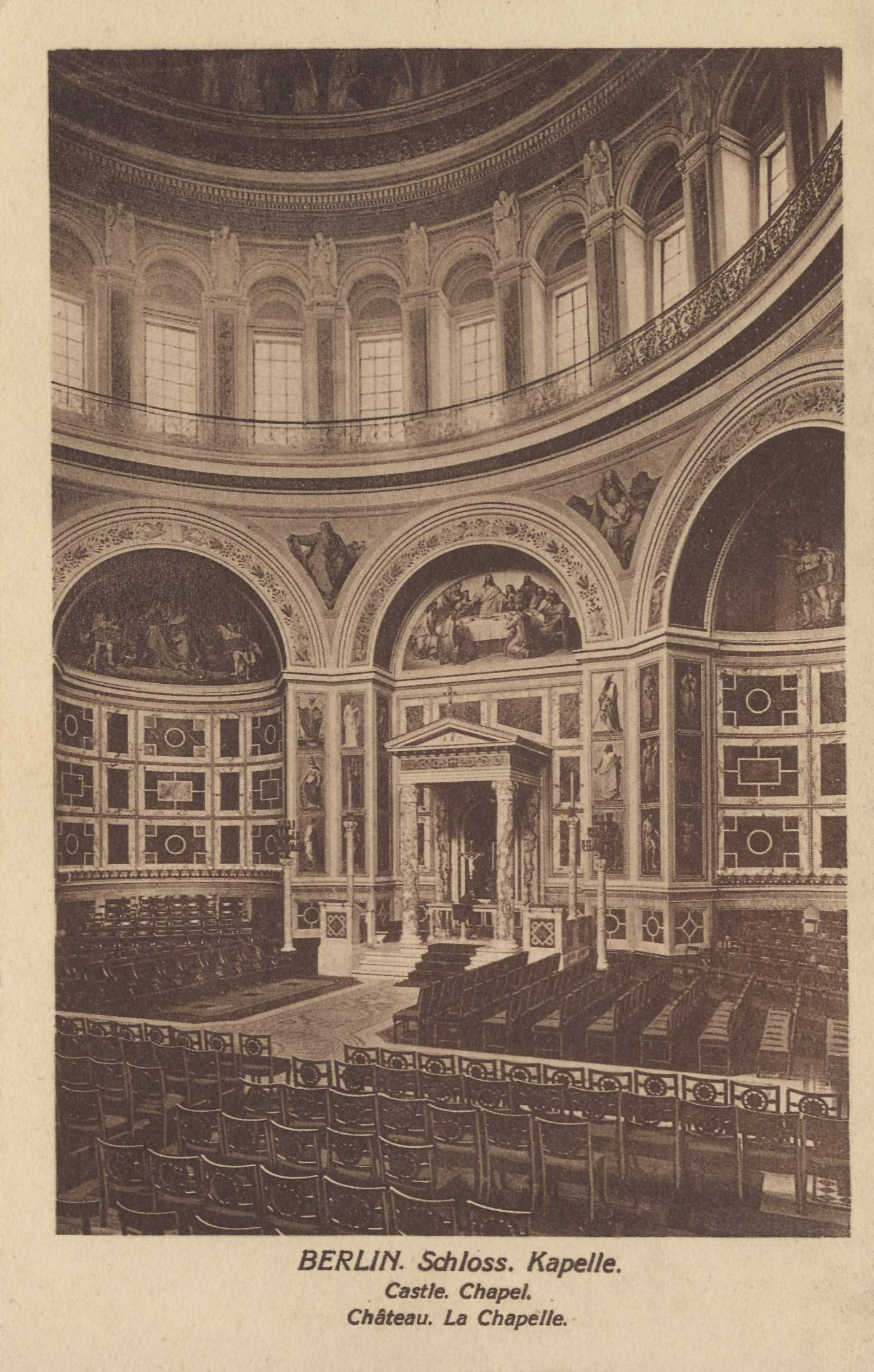
Palace chapel under the dome, c. 1900

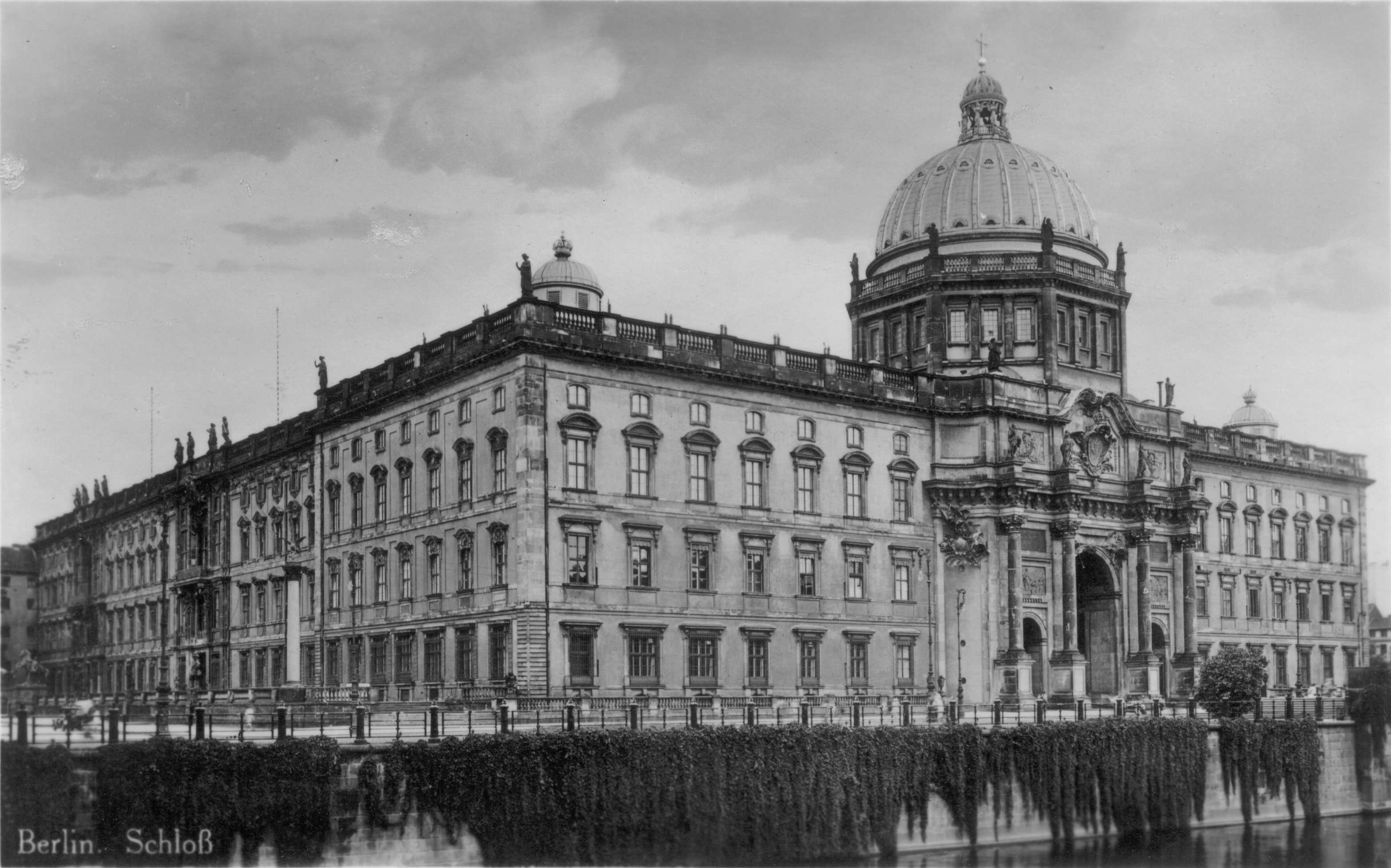
The palace's west and north façades seen from across the Spree in 1920

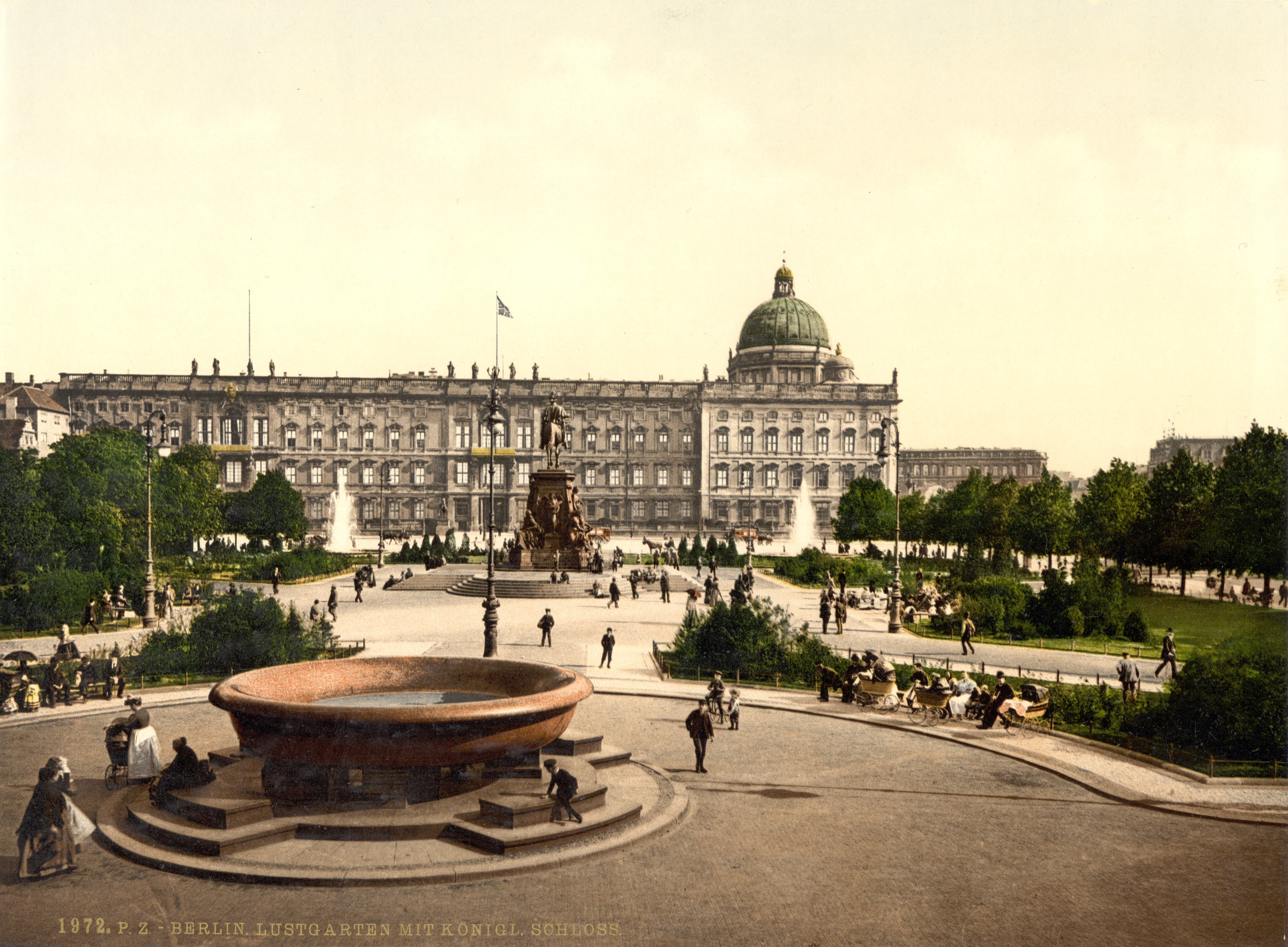
View from the Lustgarten to the palace, c. 1900

=== Postwar debate and demolition ===
The end of the war saw the palace a burned-out shell of its former glory, although the building remained structurally sound and much of its interior decoration was still preserved. It could have been restored, as many other bombed-out buildings in Central Berlin later were. The area in which it was located was within the Soviet zone, which became the German Democratic Republic. The building was used for a Soviet war movie ("the Battle of Berlin") in which the palace served as a backdrop, with live artillery shells fired at it for the realistic cinematic impact.

The new socialist government declared the palace a symbol of Prussian militarism, although at that time there appeared to be no plans to destroy the building. Some parts of it were in fact repaired and used from 1945 to 1950 as an exhibition space. A secret 1950 GDR Ministry of Construction report, only rediscovered in 2016, calculated that reconstruction of the damaged Palace could be achieved for 32 million East German marks. But in July 1950 Walter Ulbricht, the new General Secretary of the Central Committee of the Socialist Unity Party of Germany, announced the demolition of the palace. Despite objections, its removal commenced in September 1950, the process taking four months and consuming 19 tons of dynamite.

So solid was its construction that the dome and its entire mount remained intact even after the rest of the building fell to the ground. Only one section was preserved, a portal from the balcony from which Karl Liebknecht had declared the German Socialist Republic. In 1964 it was added to the State Council Building, with an altered cartouche, where it forms the main entrance. The empty space where the palace had stood was named Marx-Engels-Platz and used as a parade ground.

From 1973 to 1976, during the government of Erich Honecker, a large modernist building was built, the Palast der Republik (Palace of the Republic), which occupied most of the site of the former palace.

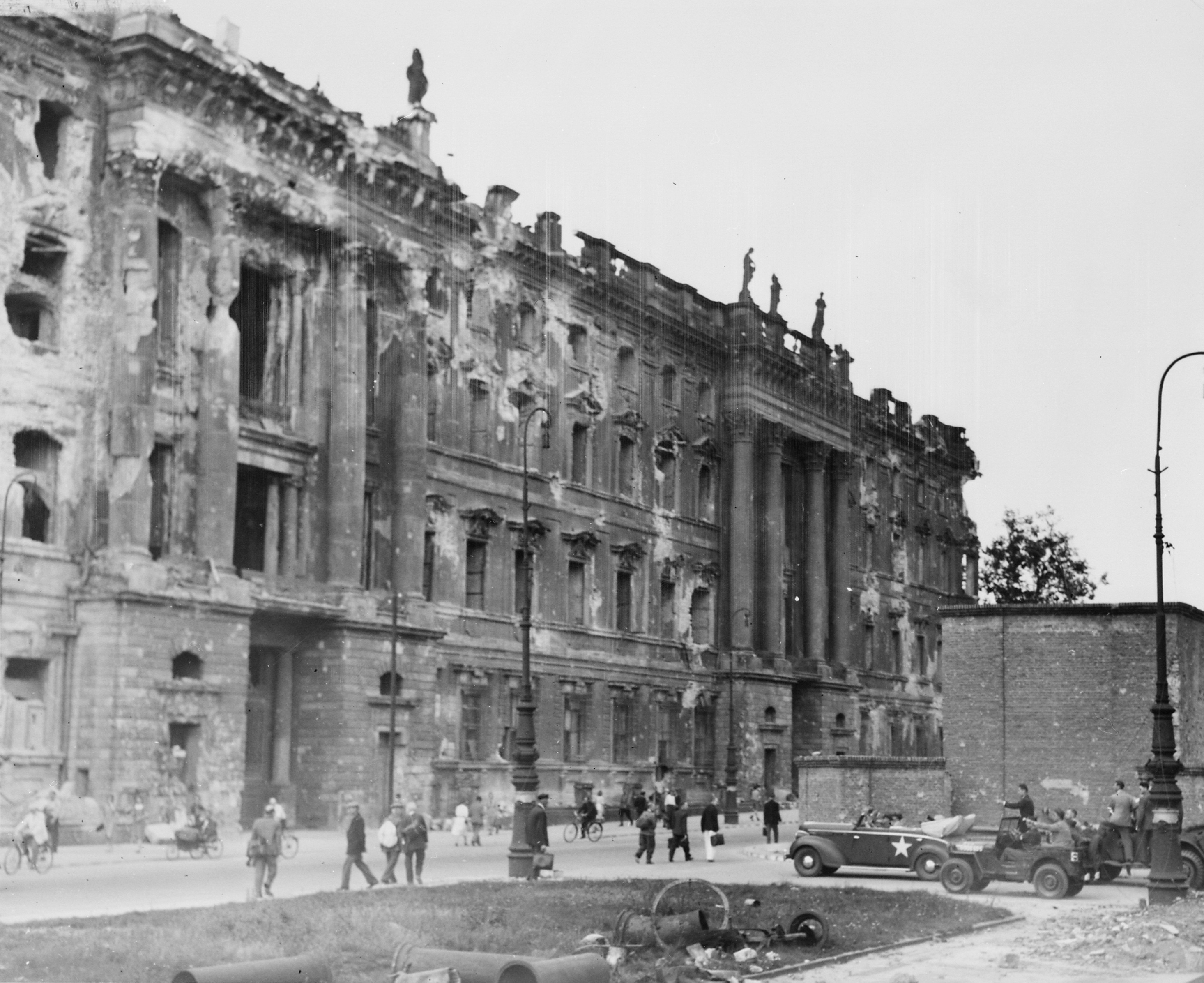
The Schlossplatz with the burned out palace in 1945, after the Fall of Berlin

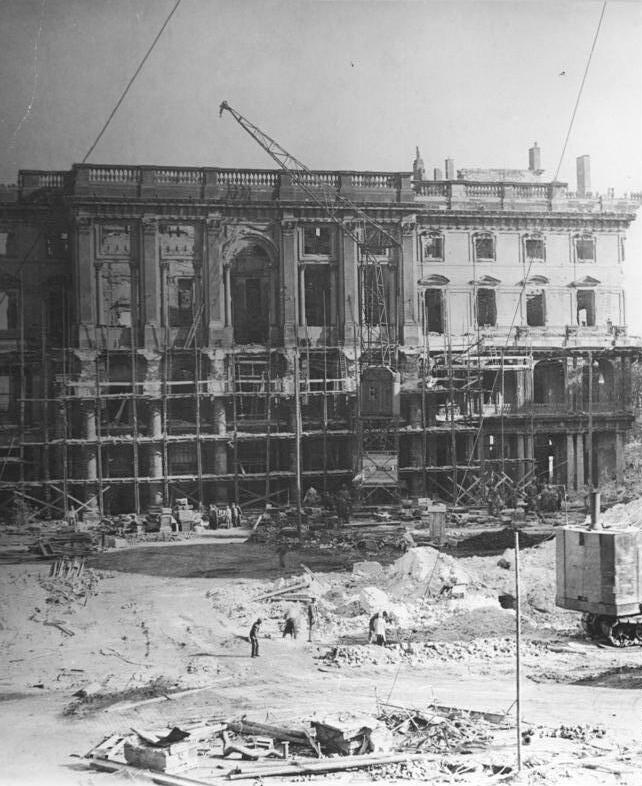
The demolition of the Schlüterhof, up to this point still largely preserved, 1950

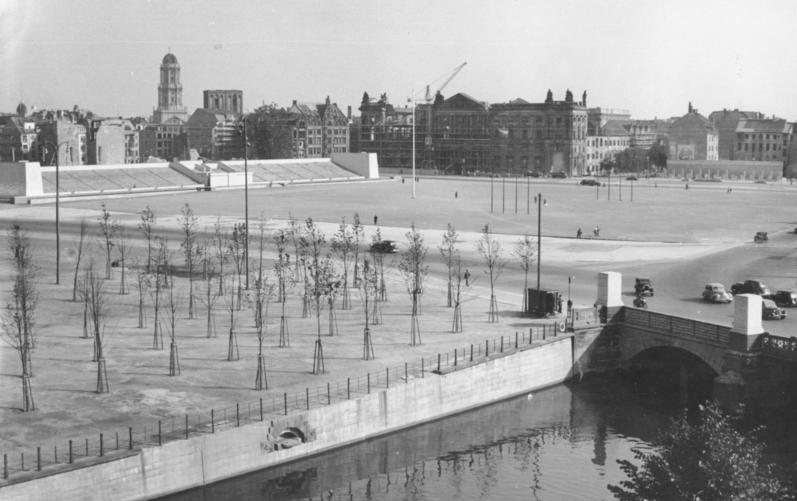
The Marx-Engels-Platz on the former ground of the palace and Schlossplatz, 1951

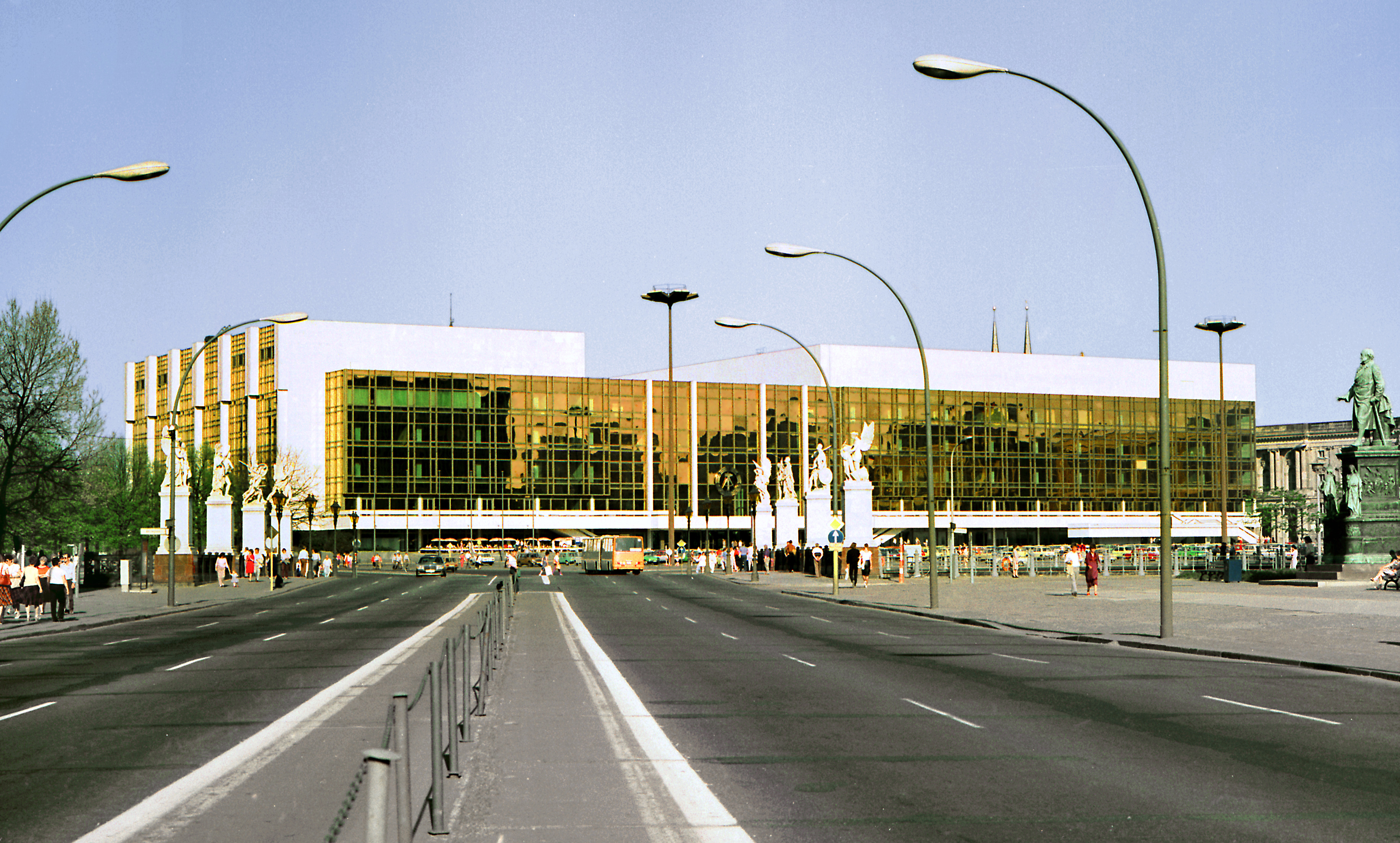
The front façade of the Palast der Republik in 1986 from Unter den Linden

=== Reunification ===
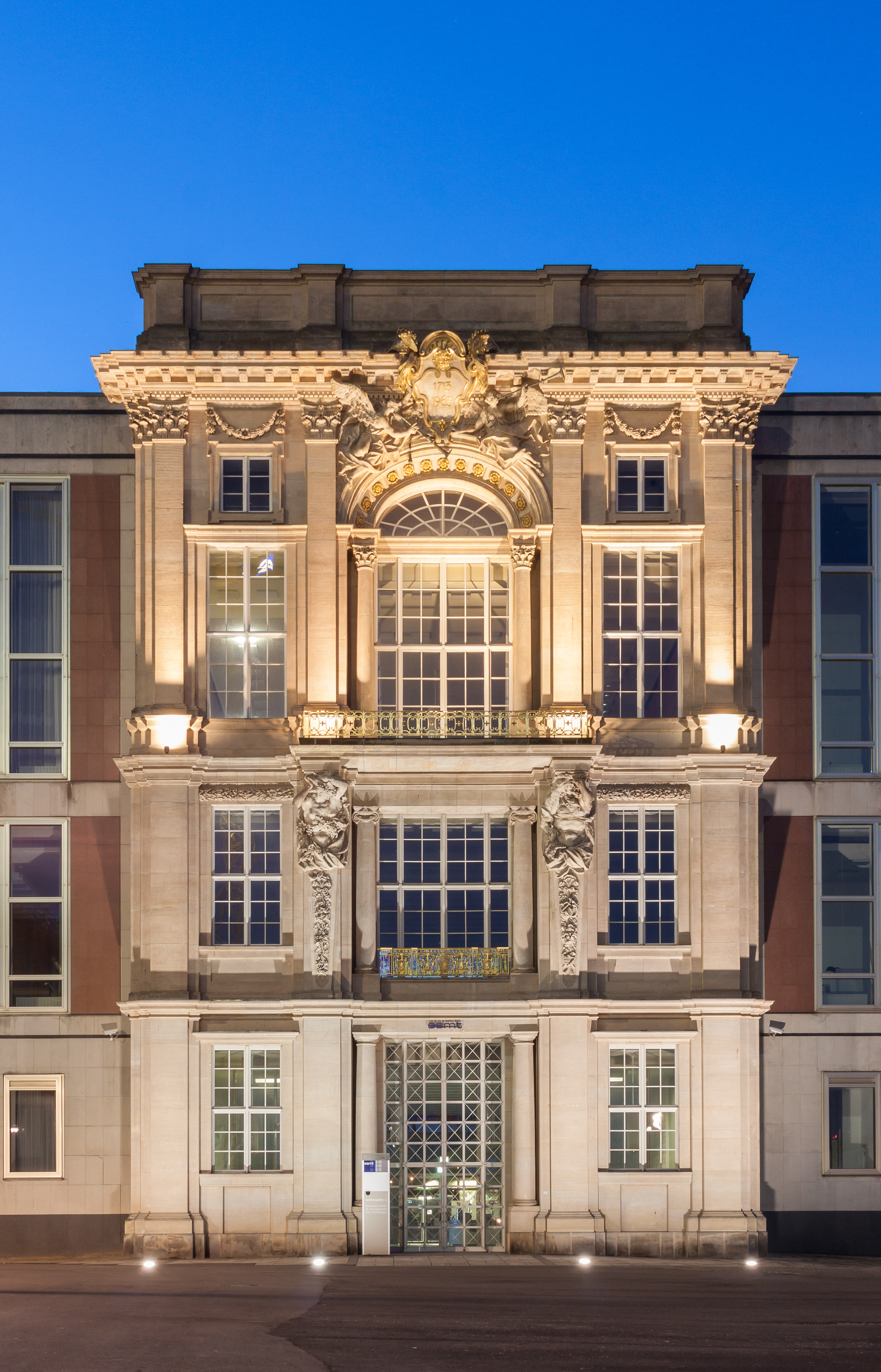
Liebknecht's balcony, one of the few preserved parts of the pre-war palace, was reused in the State Council Building (Staatsratsgebäude), now housing the European School of Management and Technology.

Shortly before German reunification in October 1990, the Palast der Republik was found to be contaminated with asbestos and was closed to the public. After reunification, the Berlin city government ordered the removal of the asbestos, a process which was completed by 2003. In November 2003, the German federal government decided to demolish the building and leave the area and the adjacent Marx-Engels Platz (renamed Schlossplatz) as parkland, pending a decision as to its future. Demolition started in February 2006 and was completed in 2009.

The demolition was lengthy because of the presence of additional asbestos, and because the palace acted as a counterbalance to the Berliner Dom, across the street, on the unstable grounds of the Museum Island. East Germans resented the demolition, especially those for whom the Palace of the Republic had been a place of fond memories, or who felt a sense of dislocation in a post-Communist world.

From 2008, until the commencement of construction in 2013, the large area of the original Schlossplatz became a grassed field, laid out on minimal lines, with wooden platforms. At the same time, the Berlin Monument Authority (Landesdenkmalamt) undertook extensive archaeological excavations. Parts of cellars that had been situated in the south-west corner of the former Palace were discovered and it was decided these would be preserved and made accessible to visitors as an "archaeological window".

=== Reconstruction ===
==== The debate ====
Following reunification, a 20-year-long debate commenced as to whether the palace should be reconstructed, and whether this should be in part or whole. Pro-reconstruction lobby groups argued that the rebuilding of the palace would restore the unity and integrity of the historic centre of Berlin, which includes the Berliner Dom, the Lustgarten, and the museums of Museum Island. Opponents of the project included those who advocated the retention of the Palast der Republik on the grounds that it was itself of historical significance; those who argued that the area should become a public park; and those who believed that a new building would be a pastiche of former architectural styles, would be an unwelcome symbol of Germany's imperial past, and would be unacceptably expensive for no definite economic benefit. Opponents also argued that it would be impossible to accurately reconstruct the exterior and interiors of the building as neither detailed plans nor the necessary craft skills were available. Others disputed this, claiming that sufficient photographic documentation of both existed when the palace was converted to a museum following 1918.

The ideological divide was epitomized by two opposing groups. The Association for the Preservation of the Palace of the Republic (Verein zur Erhaltung des Palastes der Republik) championed a renovation of the GDR building that would incorporate a re-creation of the principal western facade of the City Palace, for a multipurpose "people's center" similar to the Centre Pompidou in Paris. The Berlin Palace Friends' Association (Förderverein Berliner Schloss) argued for the complete external reconstruction of the City Palace, as they considered it the only option that would restore the aesthetic and historic ensemble of Berlin's heart; it also rejected suggestions that the proposed meticulous reconstruction would be an unauthentic "Disney" replica, as most centuries-old stone buildings are, by dint of aging and repair, at least partial reconstructions; and arguing that the allegation that the present time can only represent itself in its own architectural language, is simply ideology. The Sponsoring Association also drew attention to the observation in the Venice Charter that "historic edifices have a material age and an immaterial significance": an importance that transcends time and that, provided sufficient documentation for a truly authentic copy exists, justifies their reconstruction to preserve a vital part of urban identity and historical memory.

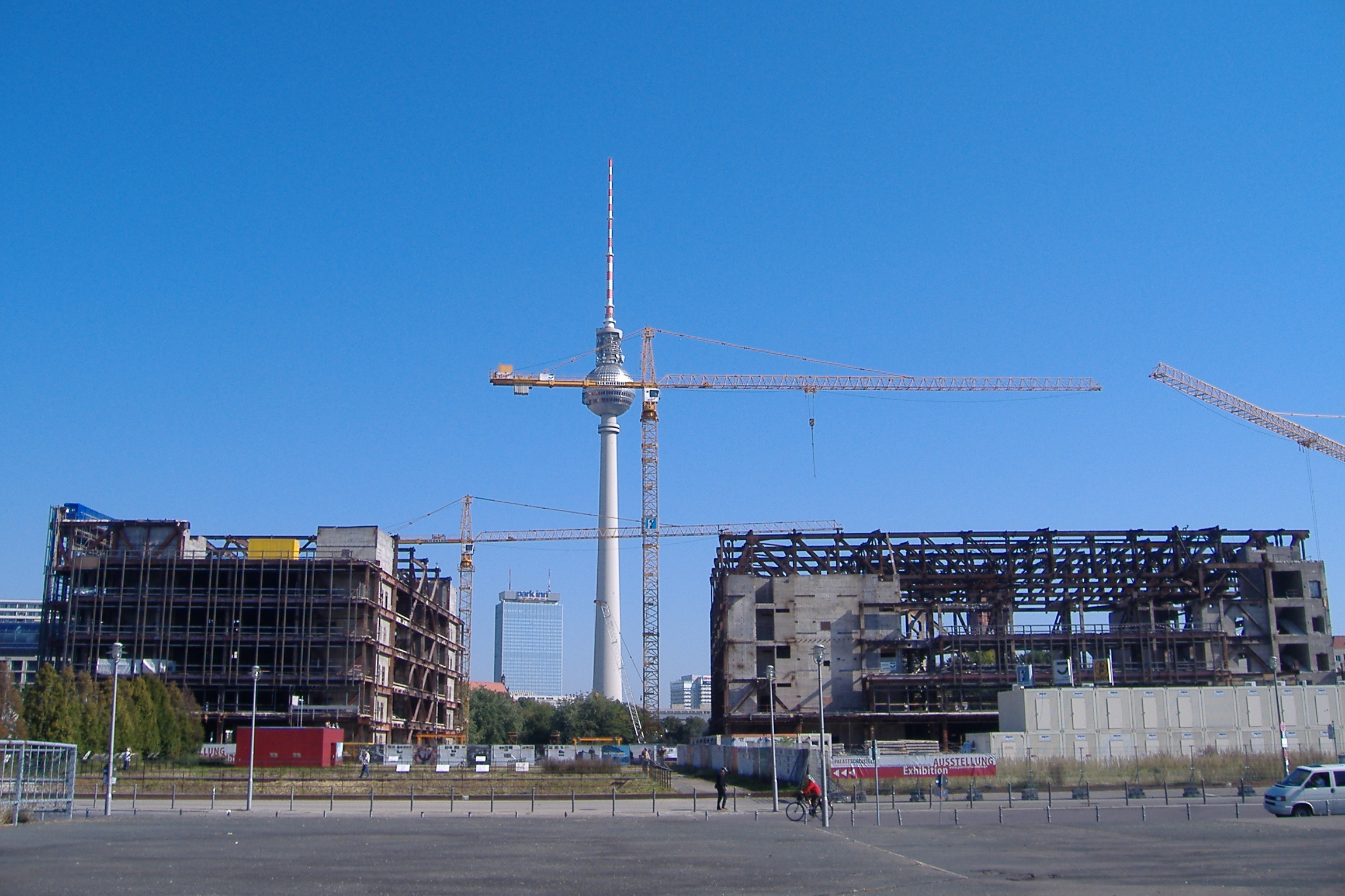
The site of the palace in 2007, with the Palast der Republik being demolished and the Fernsehturm in the background

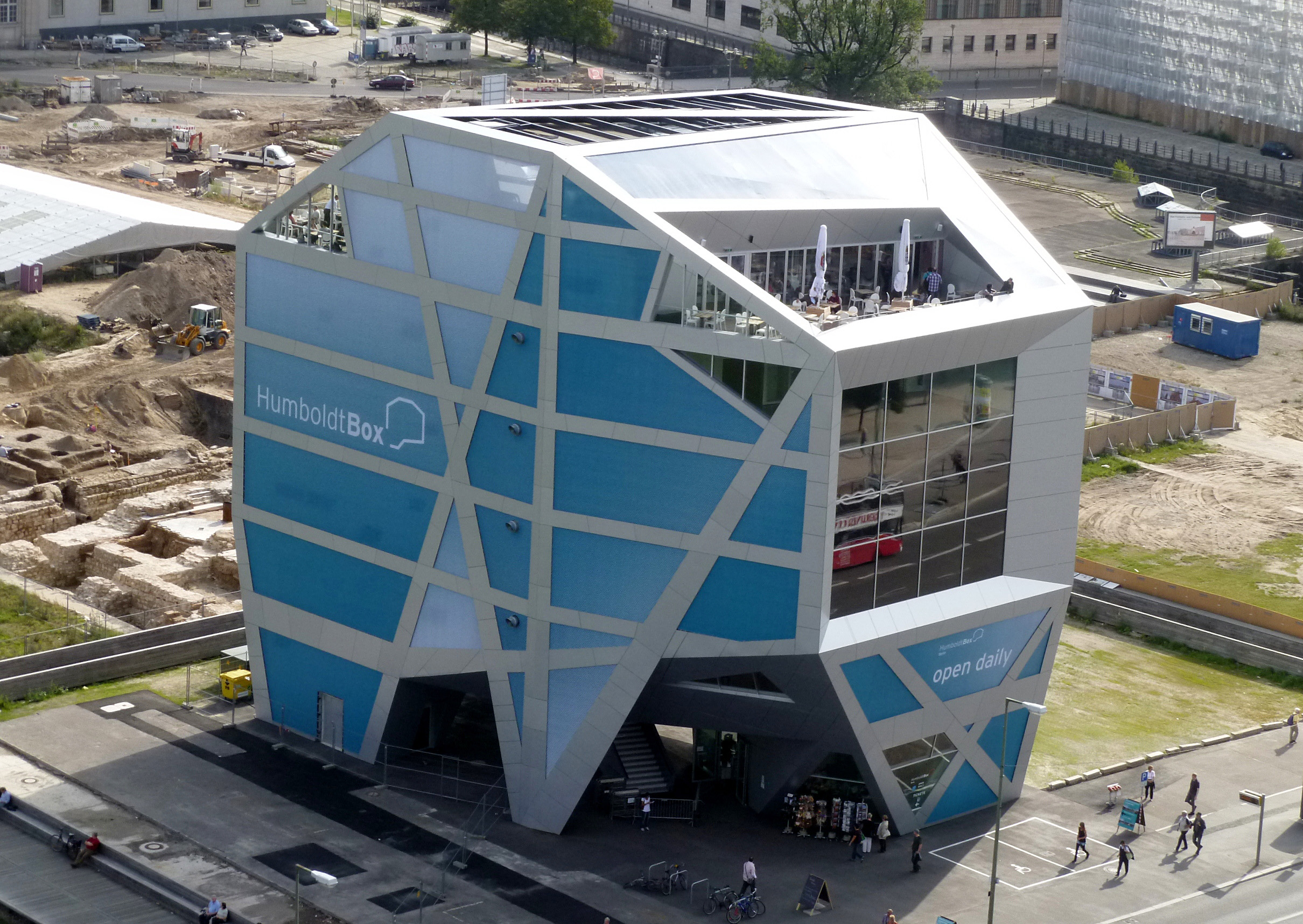
The Humboldt Box seen from the dome of Berlin Cathedral, 13 September 2011

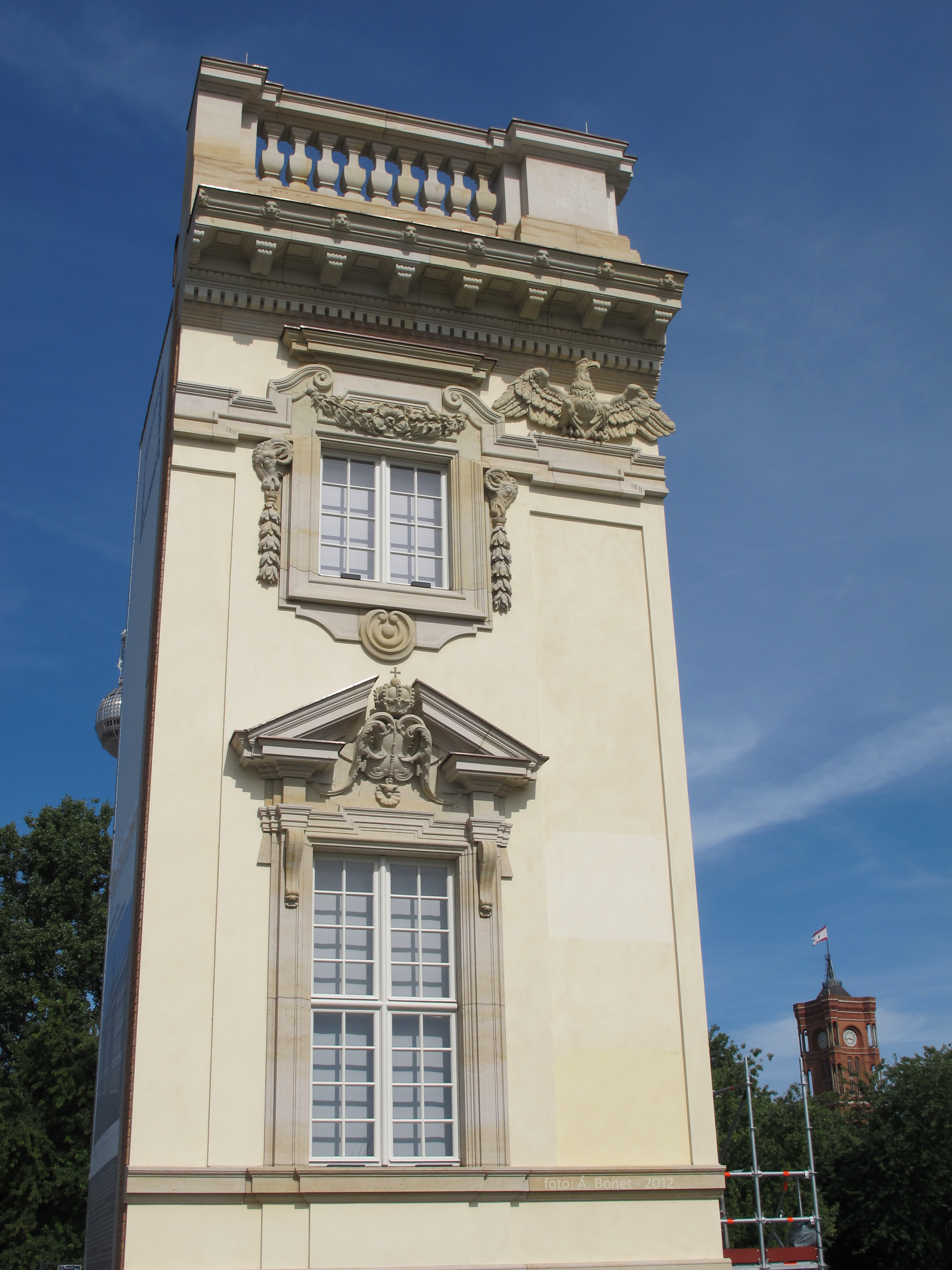
Trial section of the reconstructed façade, 18 August 2012

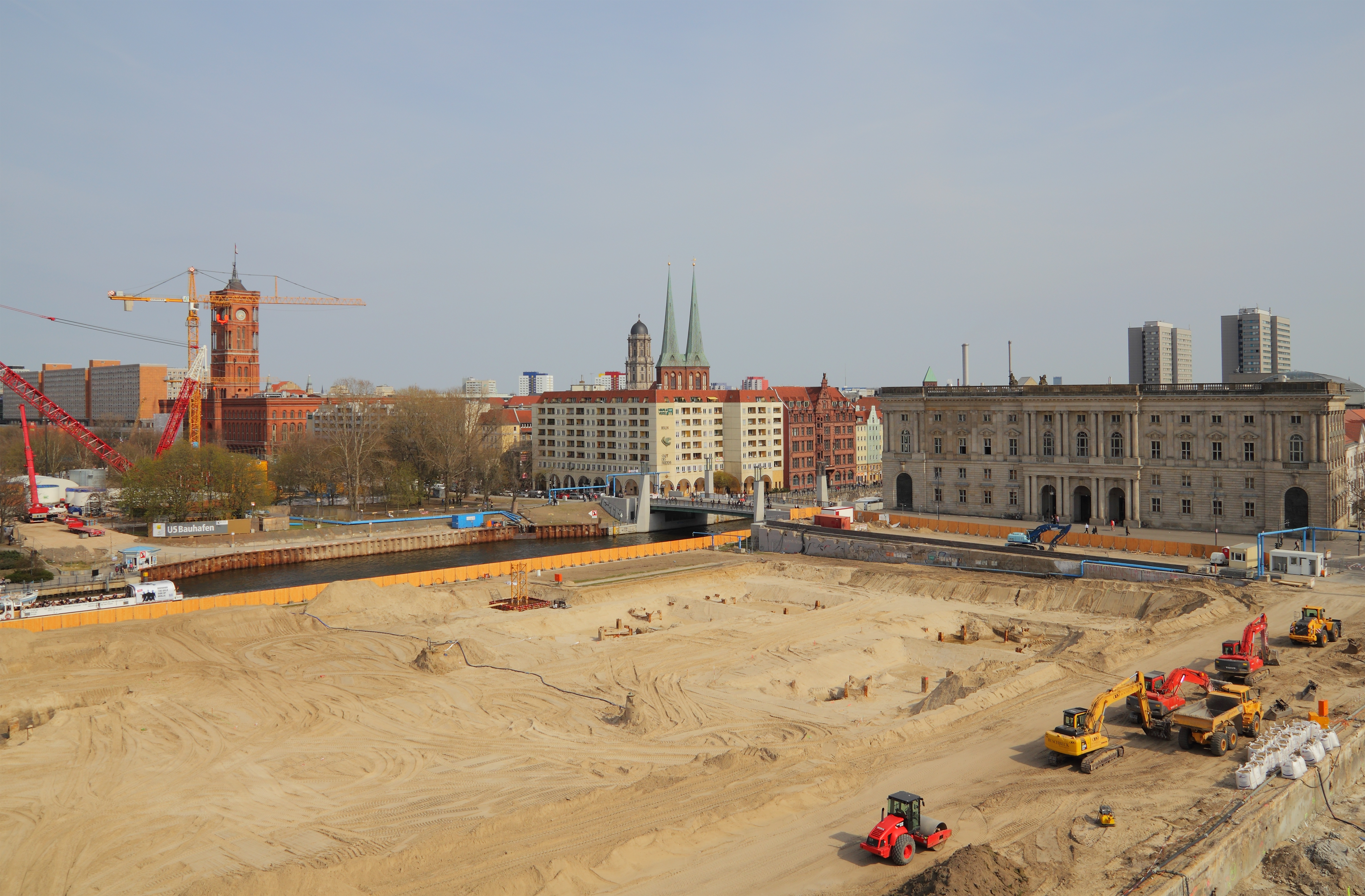
View of the reconstruction site from the Humboldt Box, 21 April 2013

==== Towards construction and additional reconstructions ====
An important driving force behind the reconstruction was businessman Wilhelm von Boddien. In 1992, he and Kathleen King von Alvensleben founded, what evolved to be the Berlin City Palace Sponsoring Association – which became the most influential lobby group. The Association accumulated plans that had been believed lost, and funded a research project at Technische Universität Berlin to measure surviving photos and drawings of the palace to create precise architectural plans.

The original decision to reconstruct the Palace was reached during a period of left-wing coalition governance in Berlin, and widespread opposition to the project. However, Boddien never allowed shifting political whims to dictate his pace; rather he made the project so technically and materially compelling that ultimately even reluctant officials had no choice but to go along with it. The turning point occurred when a friend who Boddien's suggested to him: "Those who won't listen, must see. We'll just put the Schloss there." What he meant was a simulation. According to Boddien, the Association then "didn't have a penny," let alone approval, for such an immense undertaking. However, in 1993, on the world's largest scaffolding assembly, it audaciously erected a trompe-l'œil mockup of two frontages of the palace façade on a 1:1 scale on plastic sheeting. Privately funded by donations and sponsorship, this coup de théâtre stood for a year and half. Showing a vision of central Berlin lost for fifty years, and how the palace could provide the missing link to the historical ensemble of the Zeughaus, the Altes Museum, and Berlin Cathedral, the spectacle brought the debate to a temporary climax in 1993–94. While opinion continued to remain divided, the association succeeded in winning over many politicians and other key figures to its efforts.

In view of the previous opposition, including high cost, and most importantly, the psychological and political objections, successive German governments had declined to commit themselves to the project. However, by 2002 and 2003, cross-party resolutions of the Bundestag reached a compromise to support at least a partial rebuilding of the palace.

In 2007, the Bundestag made a definitive decision about the reconstruction. According to this compromise, which had been drawn up by a commission, three façades of the palace would be rebuilt, but the interior would be a modern structure to serve as a cultural museum and forum. An architectural competition was held, and in 2008 the jury chose the submission by the Italian architect Franco Stella. Some of the internal spaces in Stella's design follow the exact proportions of the original state rooms of the palace; this would allow for their reconstruction at a later date should this be desired. The reconstruction also reproduces the original metre-thick width of the outer walls. These have been rebuilt as a sandwiched construction as follows: an inner retaining wall of concrete, followed by a layer of insulation, and an outer wall of brick, sandstone and stucco which replicates the original. Reconstruction of the Renaissance-gabled Pharmacy Wing, which connected to the palace on the north side, would be another possible future project.

German government budget cuts delayed the construction of the "Humboldtforum", as the new palace was titled. The foundation stone was finally laid by President Joachim Gauck in a ceremony on 12 June 2013 which heralded the launch of a €590 million reconstruction project.

In 2017, there was a debate whether to feature a cross on the dome of the palace, in relation to adhering to historical accuracy or secularism. Afterwards, a statue of Antinous was installed on the palace façade in the Schlüterhof courtyard. However, the cross was installed on the top of the dome on 29 May 2020.

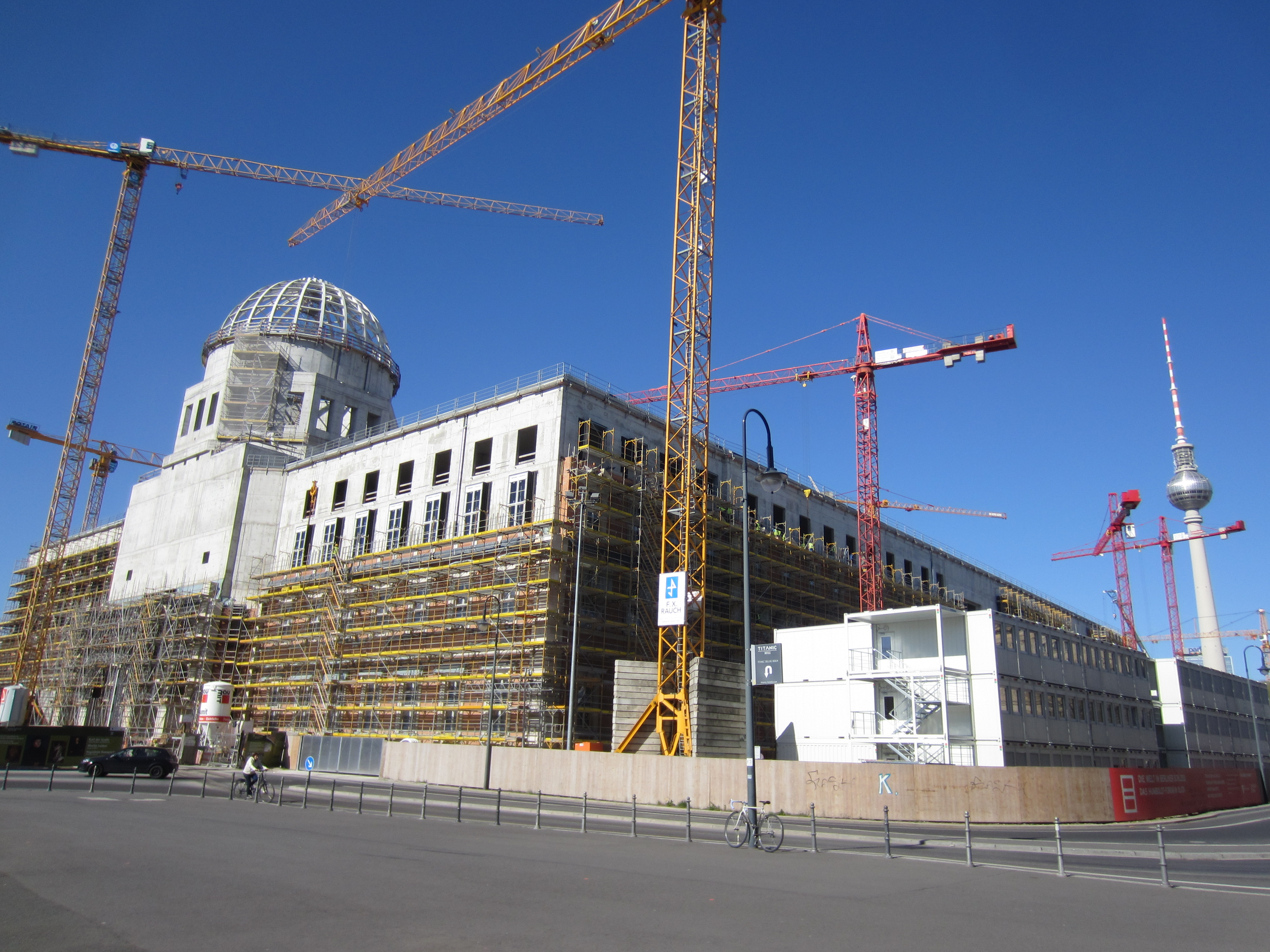
Reconstruction work under way, 20 April 2016

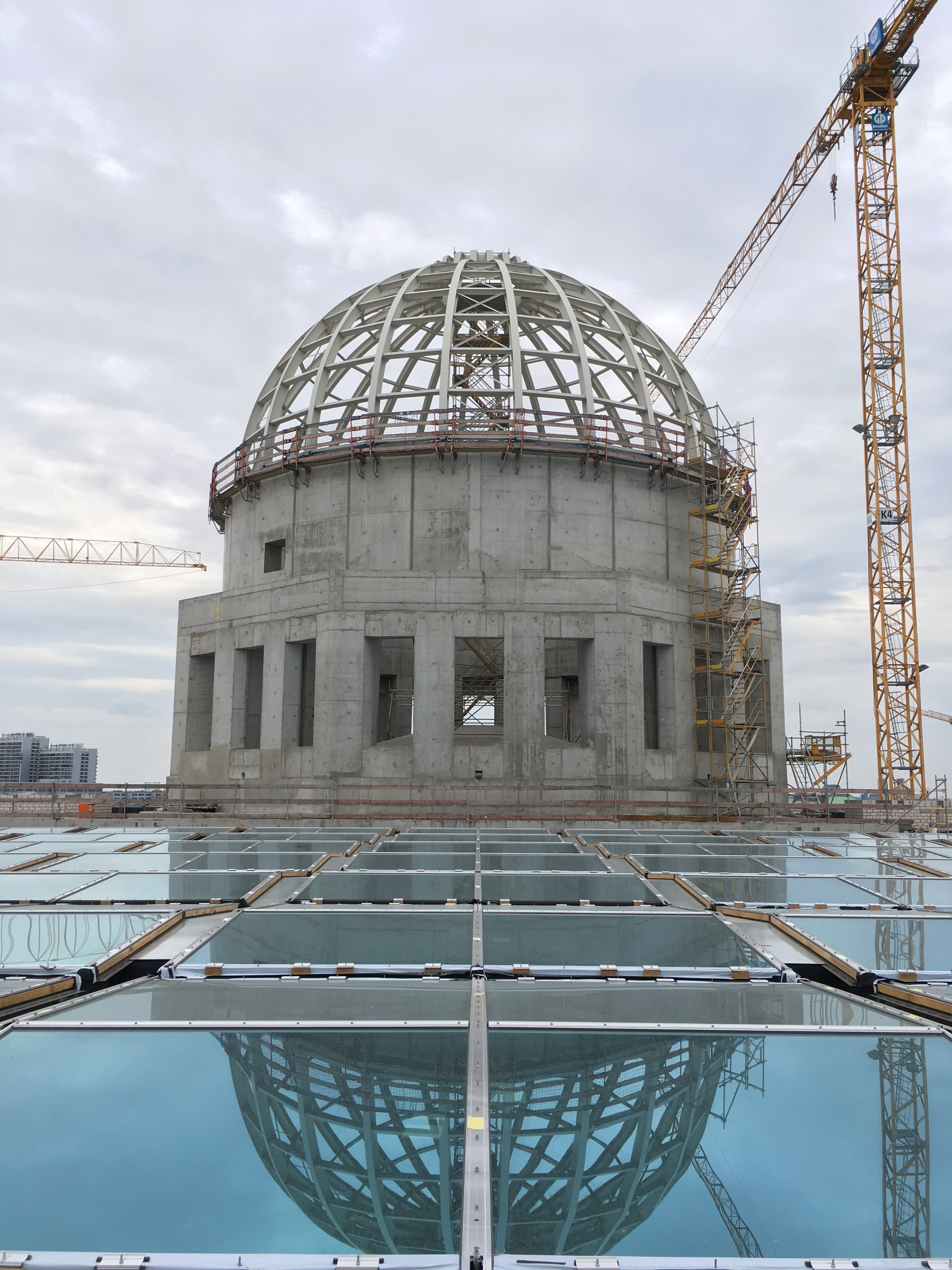
The dome under reconstruction, 11 June 2016

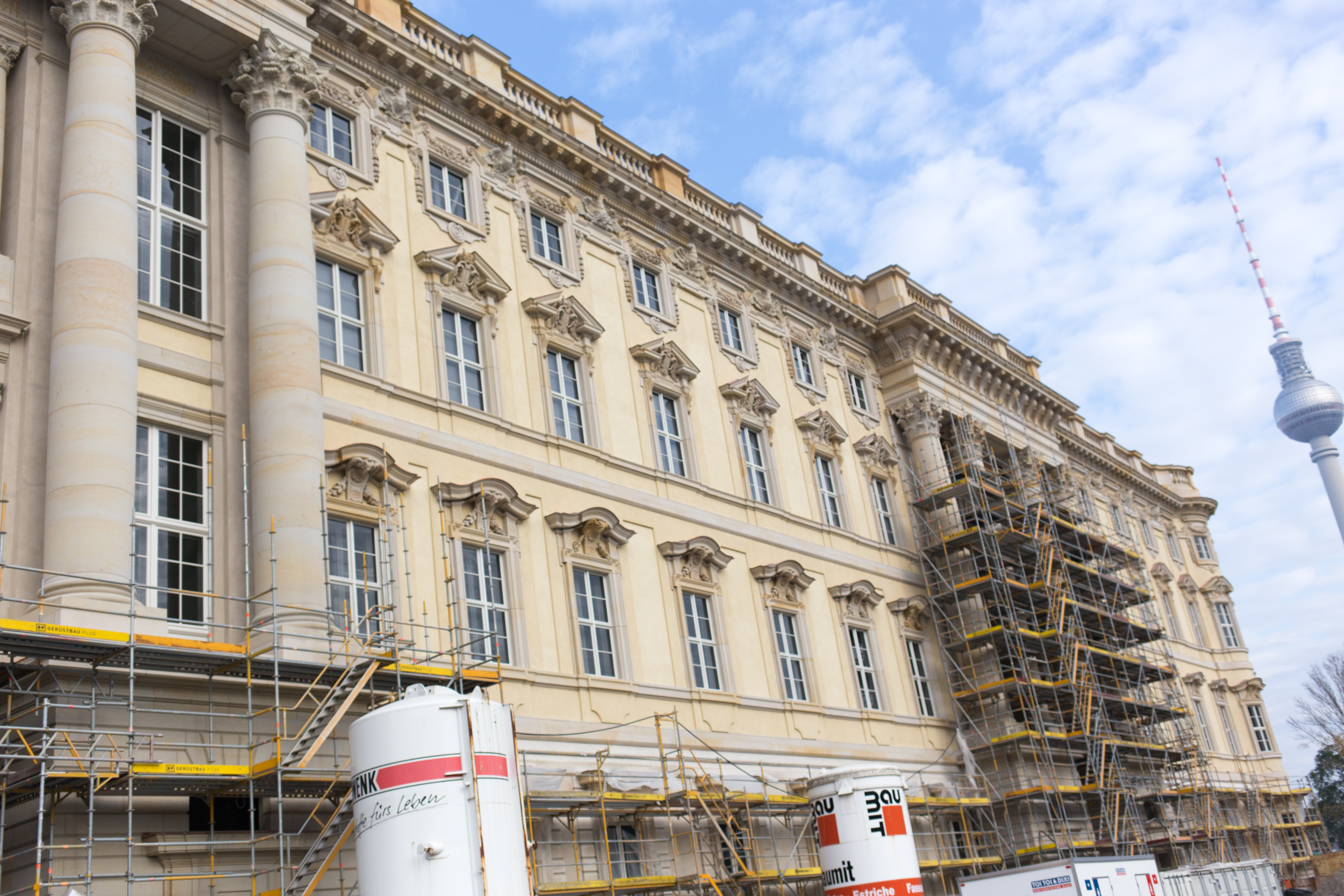
Scaffolding on the south façade, 3 November 2018

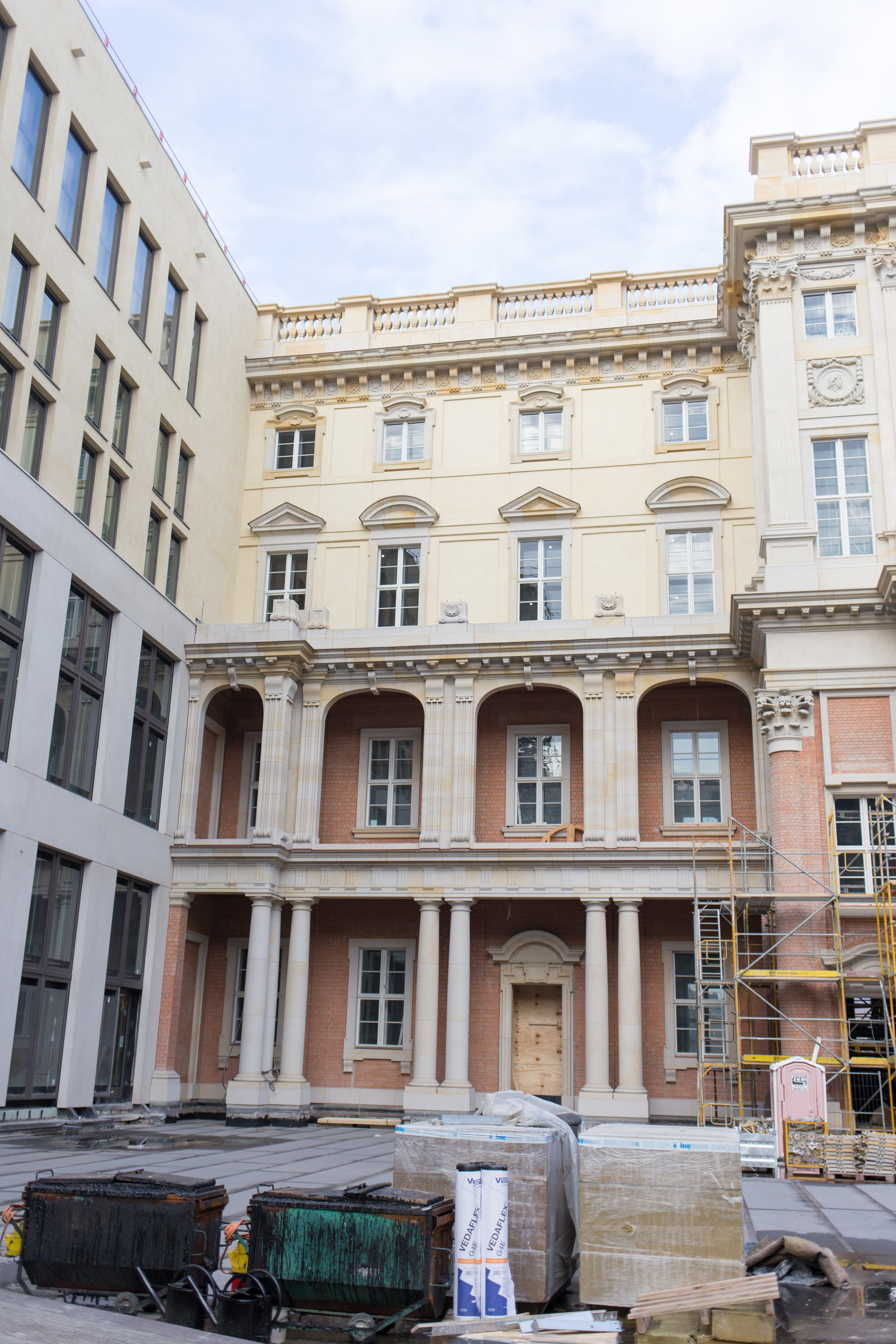
The inner courtyard, 3 November 2018

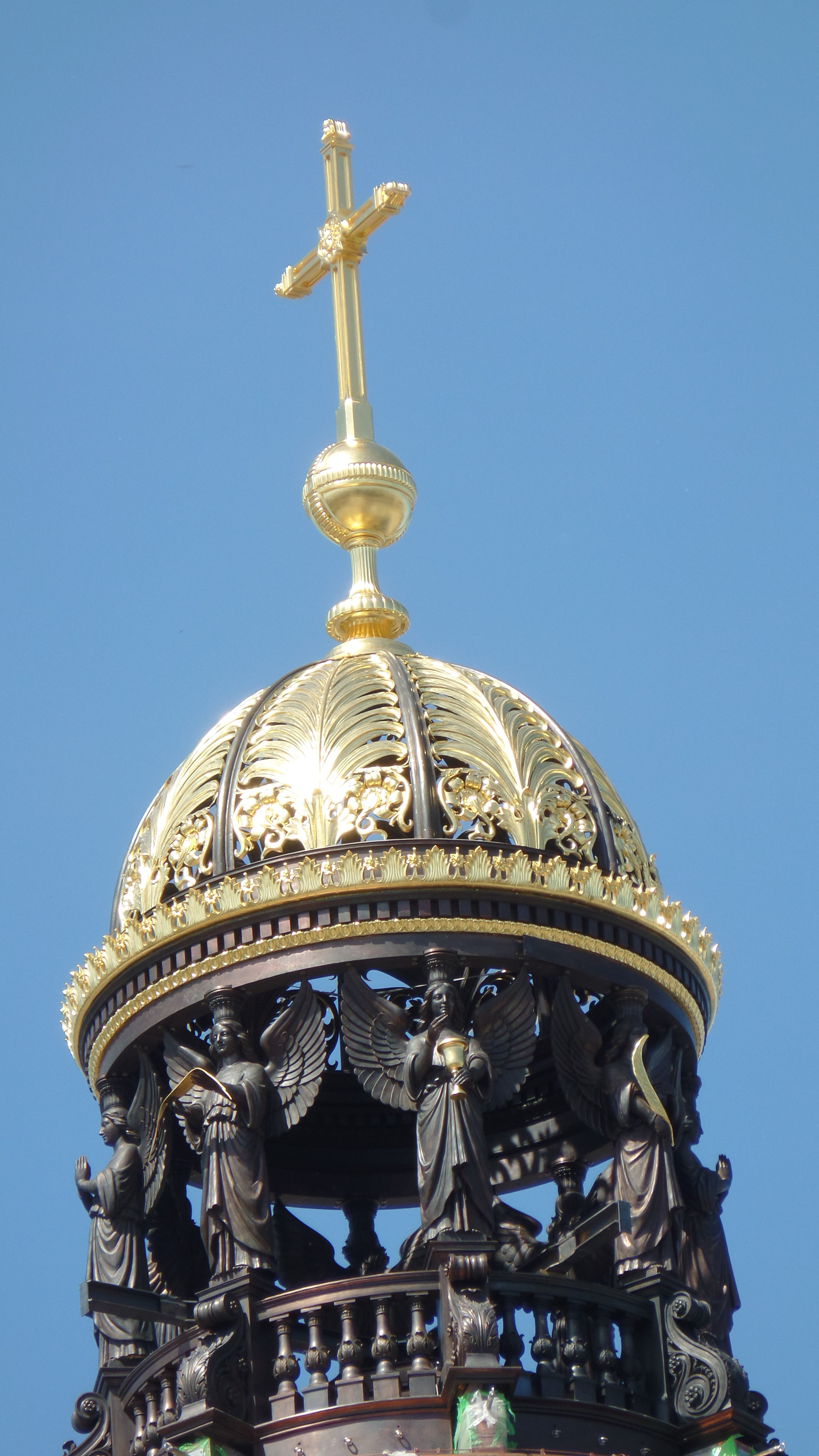
The dome topped by a cross, installed on 29 May 2020

On completion in 2020, the building housed a museum containing collections of African and other non-European art, as well as two restaurants, a theatre, a cinema, and an auditorium.

In July 2022, the bronze reliefs originally made by Otto Lessing in 1897 and mounted in 1903 were reconstructed and mounted on the Eosander Portal, the originals (like many of the exterior designs), having vanished after the demolition of the City Palace. These were soon followed by the mounting of the reconstructed plaques with the words of Frederick II, Elector of Brandenburg, and Frederick I of Prussia, the first Prussian king.

The surrounding area around the Berlin Palace which included the granite Adlersäule (Eagle Pillar), the bronze Rossebändiger (Horse Tamers), and the Neptunbrunnen (Neptune Fountain), collectively called the Schlossplatz, were planned to be redesigned by 2023 in a modern way, that will still be able to bring back the mentioned original items surrounding the palace if desired. These terrace designs ended up being implemented in a more modernistic design, different than the more ornate original design. In front of the Schlossplatz is planned the Denkmal für Freiheit und Einheit (Monument to Freedom and Unity).

In early April 2023, the Große Wappenkartusche (Great Coat of Arms) of the Kingdom of Prussia, was mounted on the center of the Eosander Portal, marking the completion of the façade decorations on Portal III. In June 2025, the last of the total 19 statues on the balustrade were installed, marking the completion of the reconstruction of the historical palace façade. The palace's interior has been designed in a way that allows to rebuild Schlüter's baroque state rooms such as the Grand Staircase (Großes Treppenhaus), the Knights' Hall (Rittersaal) and the Picture Gallery (Bildergalerie) in the long term.

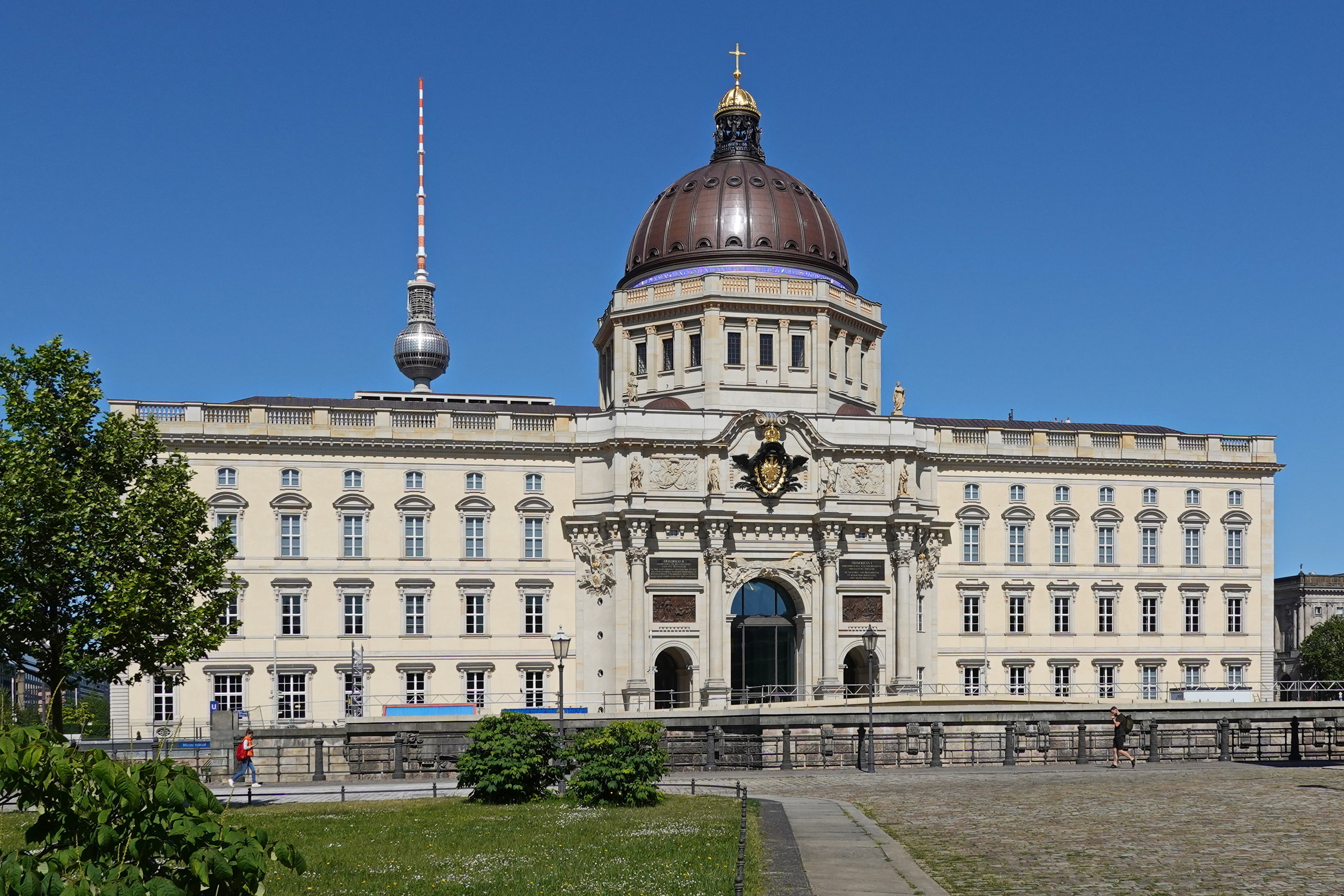
The palace with the reconstructed bronze reliefs and plaques on the portal initially designed by the architect Eosander (Note: The Fernsehturm Berlin, the antenna visible in the upper left, is not part of the palace grounds.)

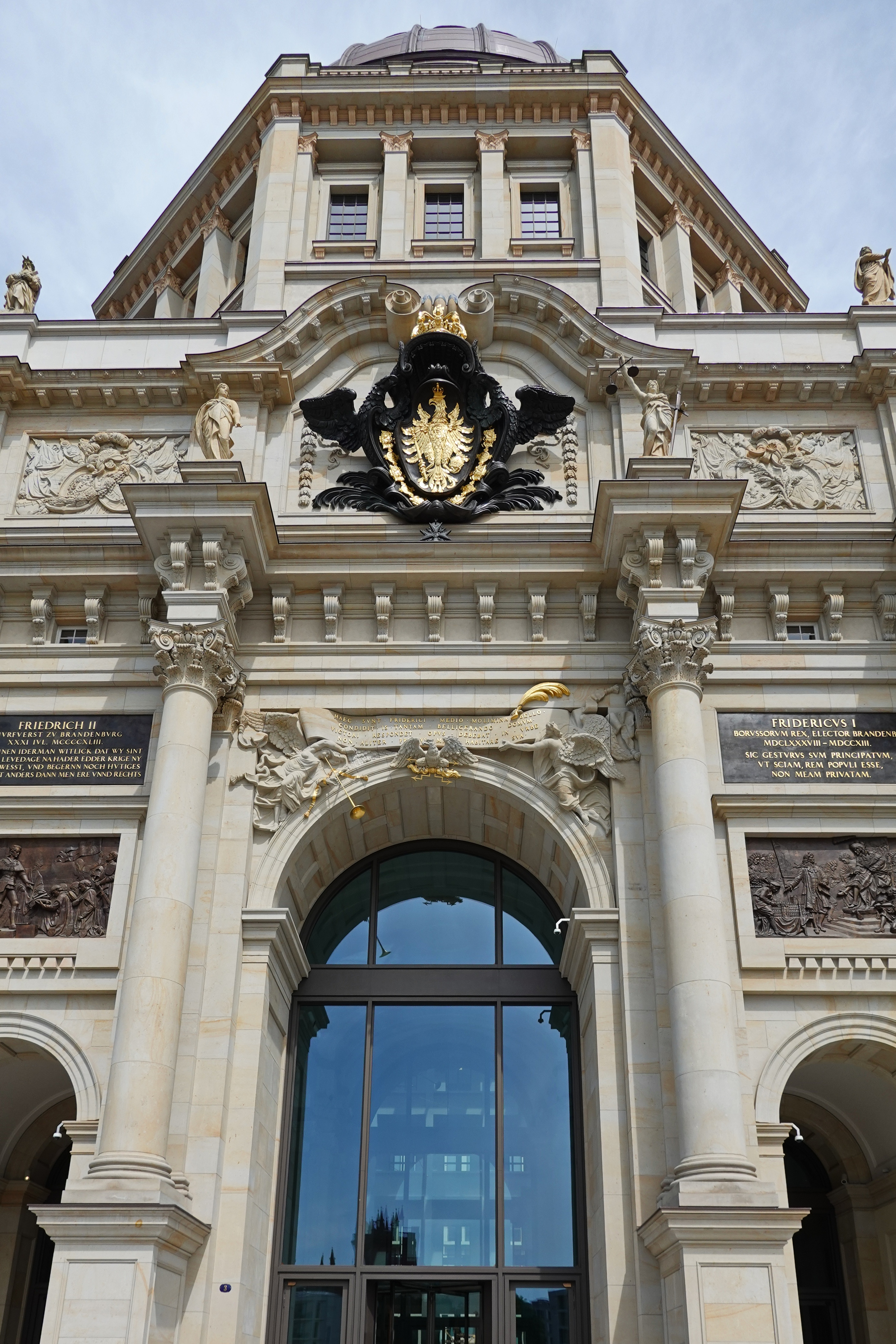
Closeup of the Eosander portal

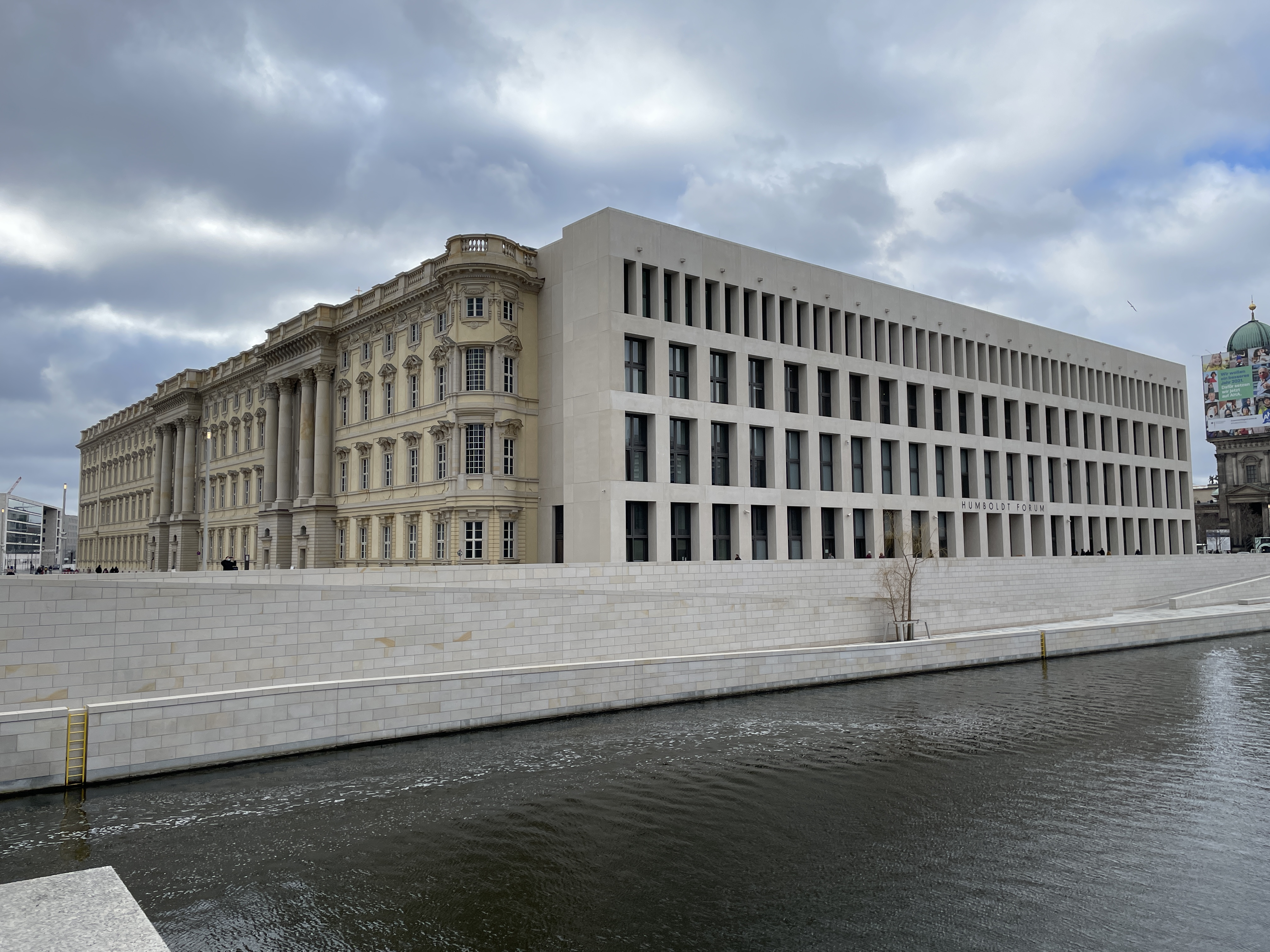
South and east façades of the palace, housing the Humboldt Forum

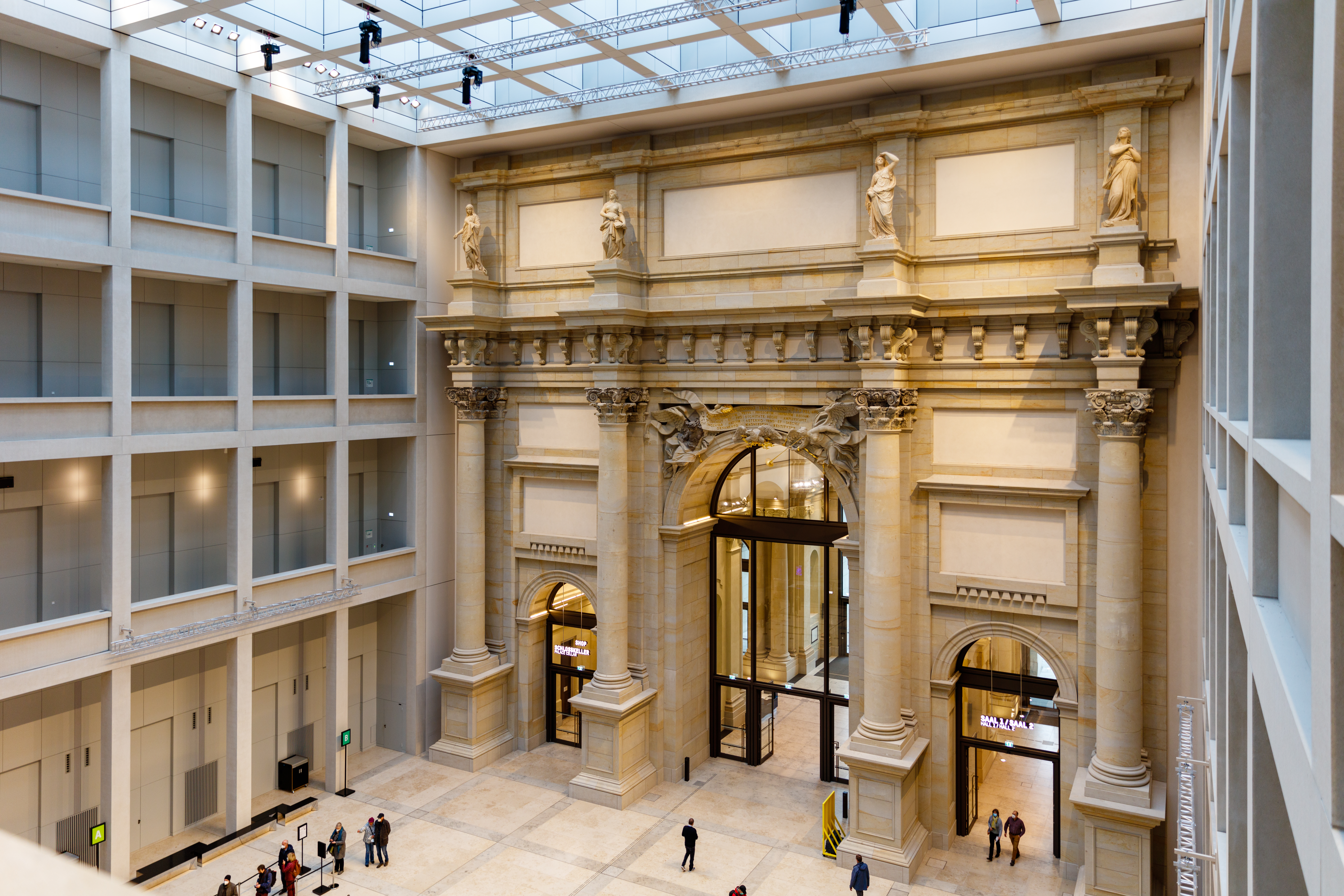
Foyer of the Humboldt Forum

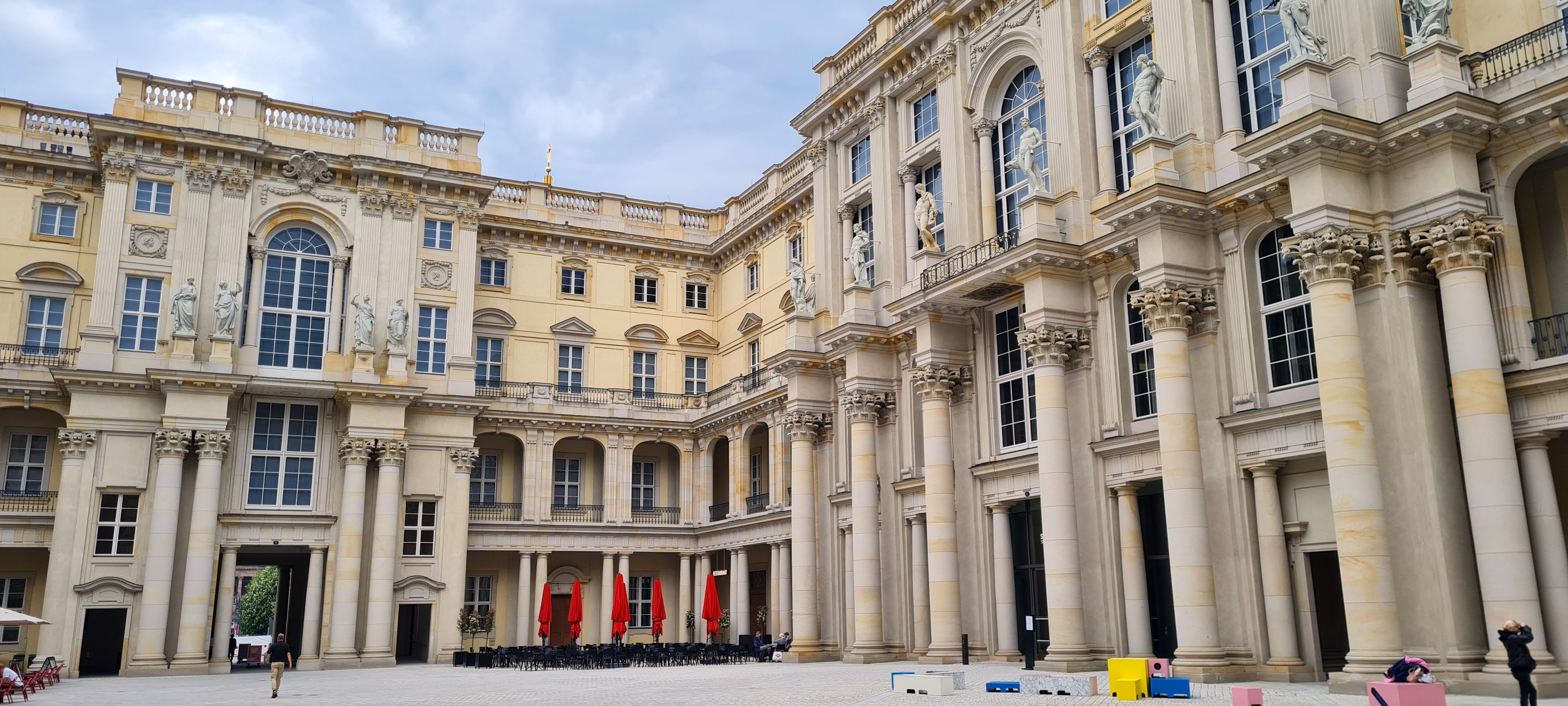
Schlüterhof

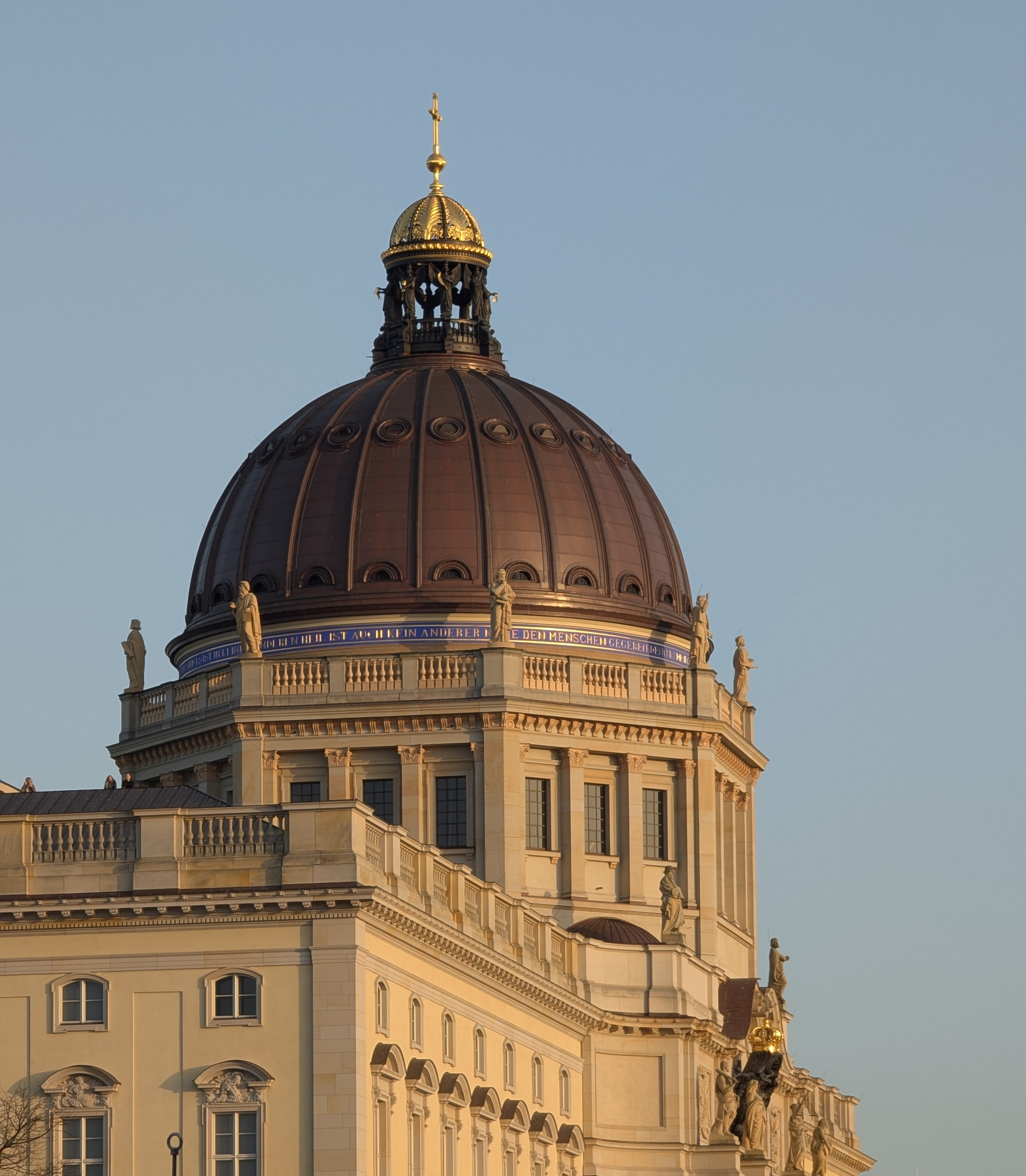
The dome with statues, 2025

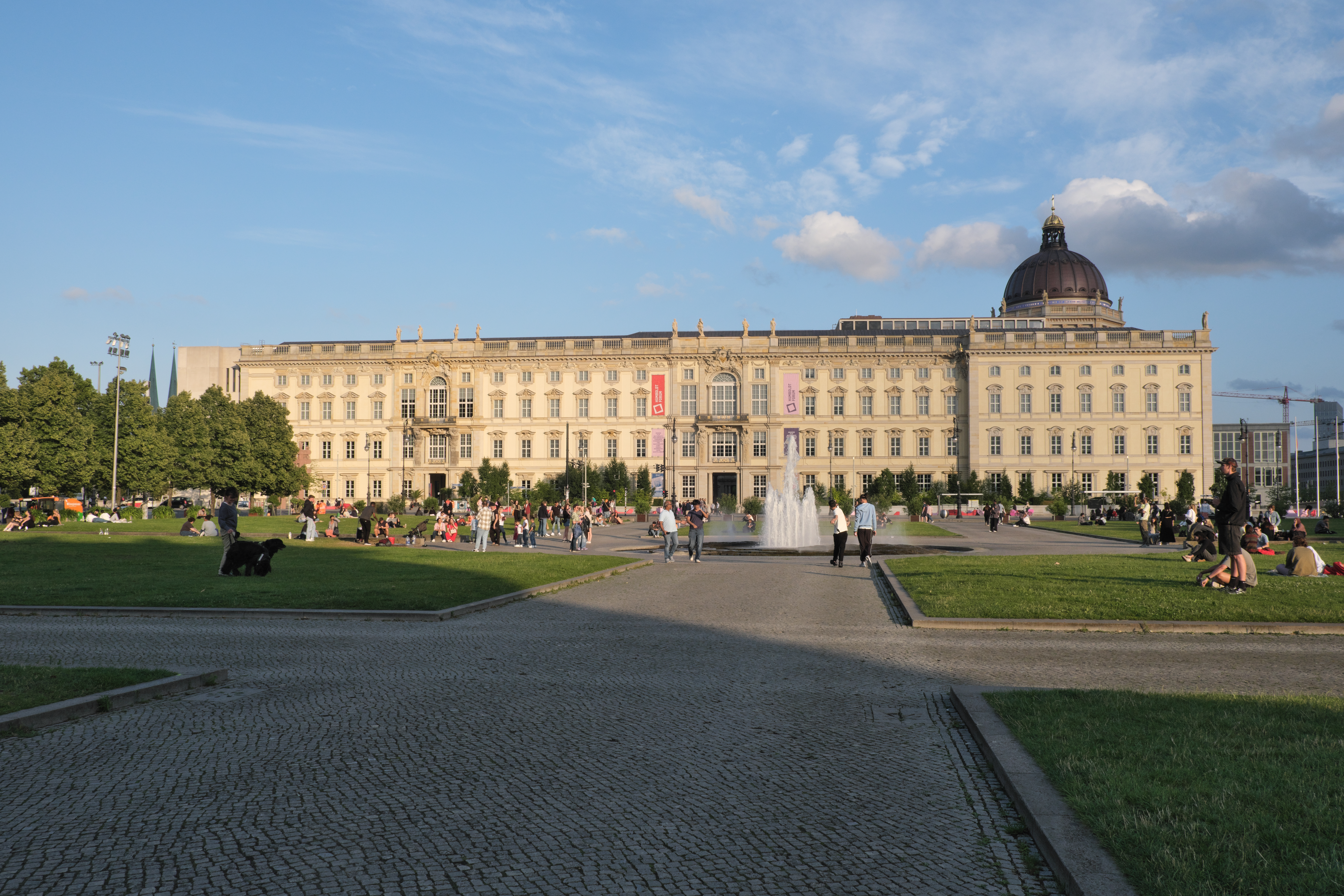
View from the Lustgarten to the palace with the statues on the balustrade, 2025

== See also ==
- List of Baroque residences
- Humboldt Forum
- Neuer Marstall

== Bibliography ==
- Albert Geyer: Geschichte des Schlosses zu Berlin (1443–1918). Nicolai Verlag, Berlin 2010. ISBN 978-3-89479-628-0. (German)
