= List of works by Otto Lessing =

This is a list of the major public architectural sculpture of German sculptor Otto Lessing (1846–1912). Paintings and private commissions are not (yet) included.

Year	Project	Location
1870	Figure Gladiator	
1873	Ethnological Museum of Berlin, dome decorations and vestibule mosaics	Niederkirchnerstraße/Stresemann-Straße, Berlin (demolished)
1875–1878	Reich Chancellory participation in the reconstruction	Wilhelmstraße 77, Berlin (demolished)
1875–1877	Palais Borsig, figures of engineers and inventors on the facade, with sculptors Reinhold Begas, Erdmann Encke and Emil Hundrieser	Voßstraße 1, Berlin (demolished)
1877	Palais Strousberg, stucco reliefs	Wilhelmstraße 70, Berlin (demolished)
1877	Café Bauer interiors	Unter den Linden 26/Friedrichstraße 85a, Berlin (demolished)
1877–1881	Martin-Gropius-Bau, town coat of arms and figurative friezes	Niederkirchnerstraße 7, Berlin
1877–1881	Zeughaus sculptures and bronze doors	Berlin (not preserved)
1878–1880	Reich Justice Ministry sculptures	Voßstraße 4–5, Berlin (demolished)
1878–1884	Technische Hochschule zu Charlottenburg decorative architectural features,	Charlottenburg, Berlin
1880–1881	Deutscher Dom attic portals and an interior relief of the Acts of the Apostles	Berlin
1882–1884	Neues Gewandhaus architectural sculptures	Leipzig (demolished)
1884–1894	Reichstag allegories of agriculture and cattle breeding on the SW Tower; decorative vases on the cornices; bias reliefs of heraldic representations of the four German Kingdoms of Bavaria, Prussia, Württemberg, and Saxony;	Berlin
1886–1890	Lessing Monument	Großer Tiergarten, Berlin
1886	Sculpture group Mutter und Kind	
1887–1891	Imperial Patent Office architectural sculptures	Luisenstraße 32–34, Berlin
1888–1889	Salon Railway car on the Imperial train of Wilhelm II	
1888–1895	Reich Court building, exterior Gable, Tympanum, sculptures, and group of figures Damnation and Salvation on the staircases	Leipzig (reconstructed in plaster)
1891–1895	Kaiser-Wilhelm-Gedächtniskirche architectural sculptures, figures of Martin Luther and Philipp Melanchthon in the choir (destroyed), Tympanum of Saint George over the Emperor's entrance	Breitscheidplatz, Berlin
1892–1894	Berlin City Palace ceiling reliefs in the new White Hall	Schloßplatz, Berlin (demolished)
1893	Marble group Bacchantin mit Amor	
1894	Marble half figure Helmuth Karl Bernhard von Moltke	
1894	Marble half figure Ludwig Knaus	
1894–1905	Berliner Dom scenic reliefs on the three main doors	Berlin
1895–1896	Bust of Wolfgang Müller von KönigswinterKönigswinter	
1896–1901	Stadtbad Kreuzberg architectural sculpture	Baerwaldstraße 64–68, Berlin
1897	Berliner Stadtschloss bronze reliefs of Frederich I and Frederich II	Berlin (demolished)
1897–1900	Neuer Marstall architectural sculpture Prometheus with the Oceanids and Perseus and Andromeda on the north side	Schloßplatz 7, Berlin
1899–1902	Stadtbad Prenzlauer Berg architectural sculpture	Oderbergerstraße 57–59, Berlin
1900	W. Spindler commercial building, architectural sculpture	Leipziger Straße 42, Berlin
1900	Statue of Albert Achilles, Elector of Brandenburg and busts of Werner von der Schulenburg and Ludwig von Eyb	Siegesallee, Berlin
1900	Equestrian statue of Kaiser Wilhelm I	Hildesheim (melted)
1901–1903	Spindlershof	Wallstraße 9–13, Berlin
1900	Die Kreuzträger/Leben unter dem Kreuze, marble sculpture	Kirkeveien 167/Stensgaten, Oslo, Norway
1901–1904	Lessingbrücke bronze reliefs and ornamental pillars	Berlin
1902–1903	Roland Fountain	Kemperplatz, Berlin (demolished)
1902–1903	Hercules Fountain	Lützowplatz, Berlin (demolished)
1903–1904	William Shakespeare Monument	Weimar
1903–1910	Kaiser-Wilhelm-Akademie architectural sculptures	Invalidenstraße 48–49, Berlin
1903–1914	Berlin State Library allegorical representations, with Robert Schirmer and Constantin Starck	Berlin
1904–1905	Konzerthaus Berlin participation in the rebuilding	Gendarmenmarkt, Berlin
1904	Prussian House of Lords Tympanum, figures Nährstand and Wehrstand	Leipziger Straße, Berlin
1907	Bust of Joseph Joachim	
1910	St. Michaelis Church, Hamburg pulpit, organ, choir, and stucco ornamentation	Hamburg
1912	Monument to Martin Luther	Hamburg

== Sources ==
- Jörg Kuhn: Otto Lessing (1846–1912). Sculptor, Artisan, Painter. The Life and Work of a Sculptor of late Historicism, in Particular His Architectural Sculpture. (in German) Dissertation, Freie Universität Berlin, 1994.
