= Castle Street =

Castle Street may refer to:

- Castle Street, Bridgwater, England
- Castle Street, Cambridge, England
- Castle Street, Dunedin, New Zealand
- Castle Street, Liverpool, England
- Castle Street, Oxford, England
- Castle Street, Gibraltar

== See also ==
- Castle St, a 2022 album by New Zealand band Six60
- Castle Street Row, a historic building in Worcester, Massachusetts, US
- The Madhouse on Castle Street, a British television play
- Castle Square (disambiguation)
