= Castle Square =

Castle Square may refer to:

- Castle Square, Sheffield, England
- Castle Square, Warsaw, Poland
- Castle Square, Beirut, Lebanon

== See also ==
- Castle Street (disambiguation)
- Schloßplatz (disambiguation)
