= Humboldt Box =

- Humboldt-Box
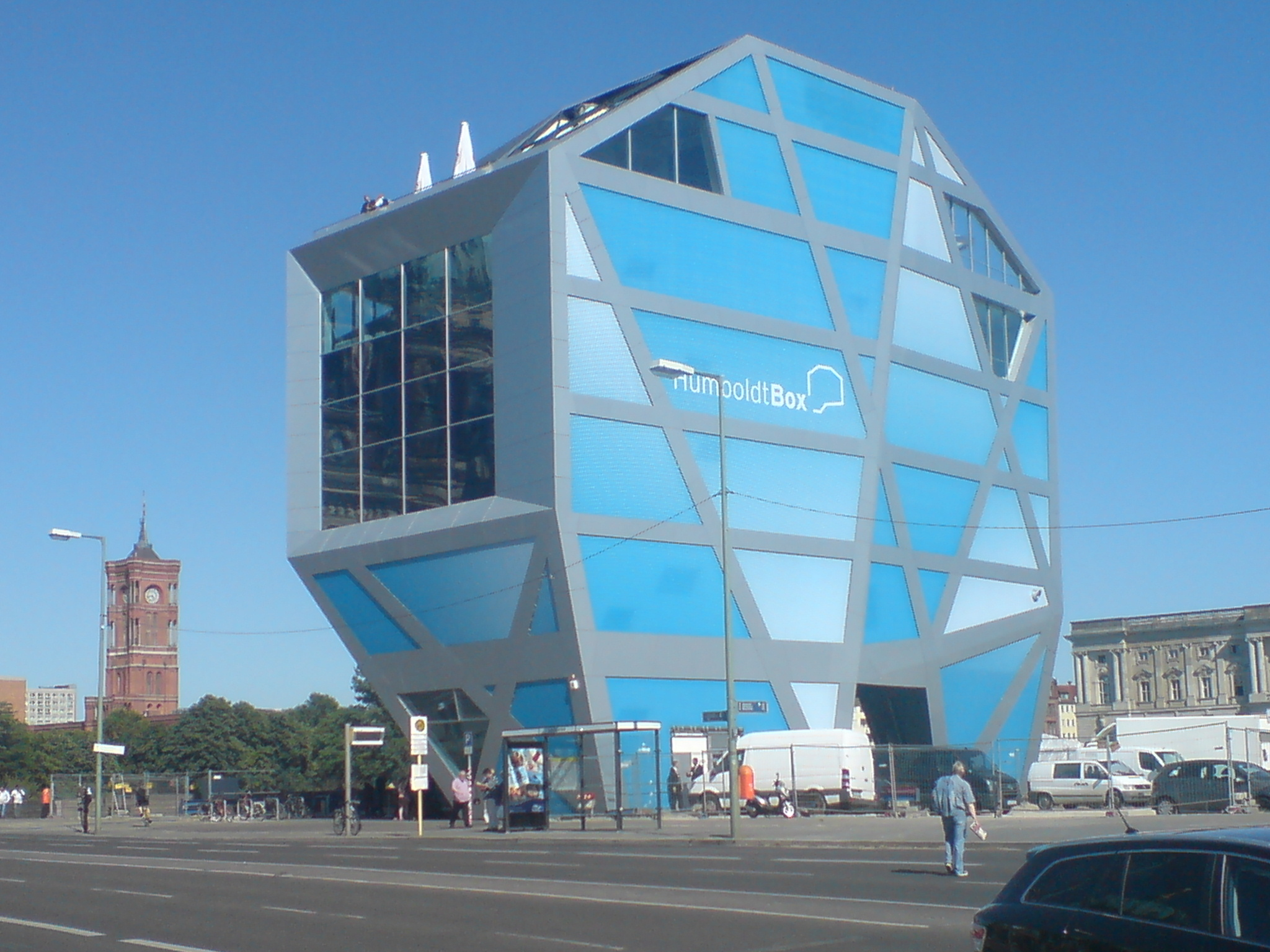
- The building in June 2011
- Interactive map of the Humboldt Box area

General information
- Type: Temporary exhibition space
- Location: Schloßplatz, Berlin, Germany
- Coordinates: 52.5177°N 13.400429°E
- Opened: 29 June 2011

Design and construction
- Architecture firm: KSV Krüger Schuberth Vandreike

View from the rooftop restaurant towards Berlin Cathedral

The Humboldt Box (German: Humboldt-Box) was a futuristic museum structure on the Schloßplatz in the center of Berlin, Germany. It was built as a temporary exhibition space and viewing platform for the Humboldt Forum construction project and to inform the public about its future use.

== Description ==
The futuristic five-story building in the center of Berlin, complete with terraces and a rooftop restaurant overlooking the Lustgarten, was 28 metres (92 ft) high and had an area of 3,000 square metres (32,000 sq ft). It opened on 29 June 2011 and welcomed its 100,000th visitor 50 days later. The structure was removed prior to the completion of the Humboldt Forum in February 2019.

The Humboldt Box featured exhibits sponsored by the Friends of the Berlin Palace (German: Förderverein Berliner Schloss e.V.) and organizations projected to be housed in the future Humboldt Forum, including the Ethnological Museum of Berlin, the Museum of Asian Art, the Prussian Cultural Heritage Foundation, various departments of Humboldt University and the Central and Regional Library of Berlin. One floor of the building also served as a venue for private events. The Humboldt Box was designed by the architectural firm of KSV Krüger Schuberth Vandreike.

== Background ==
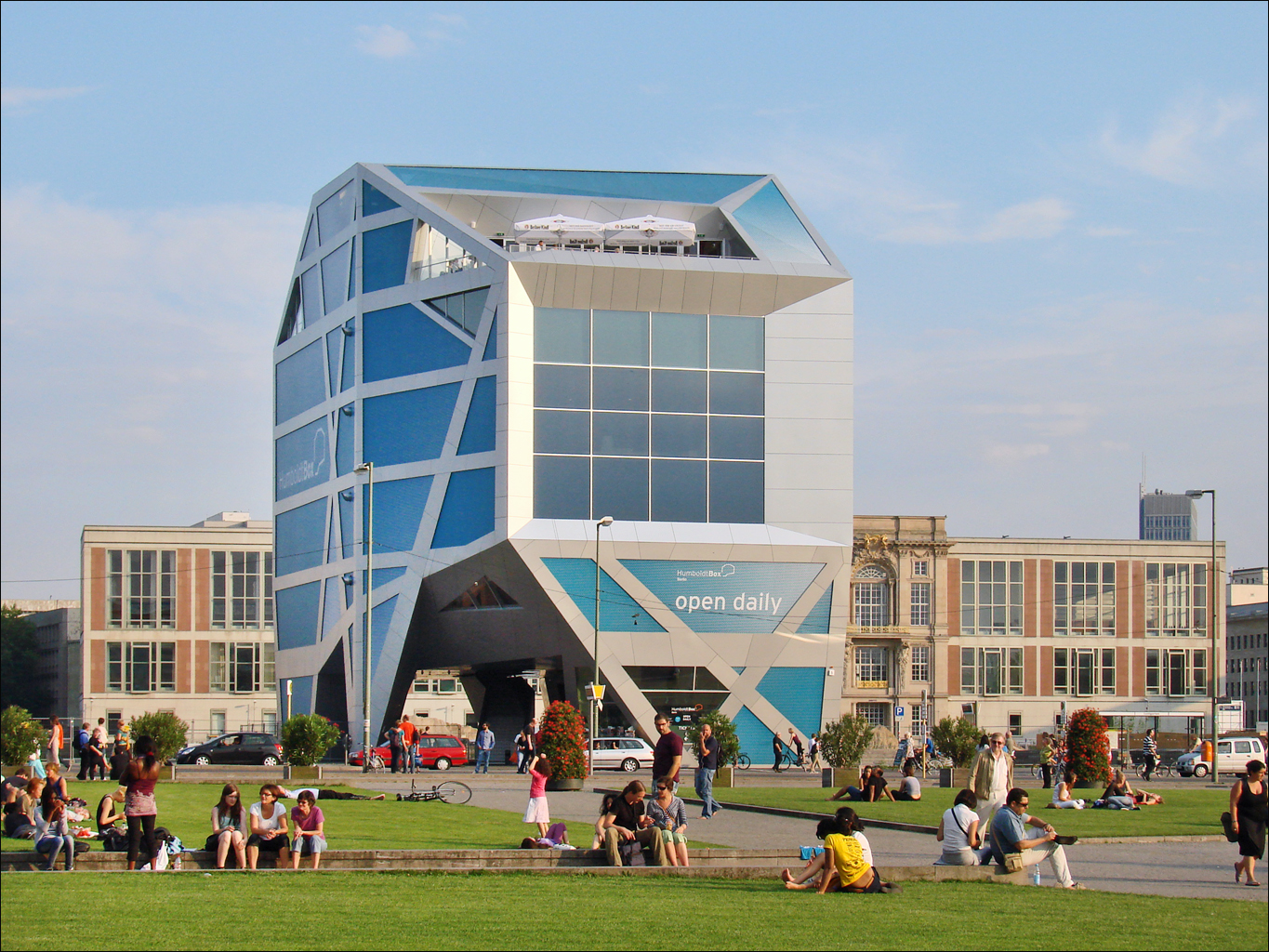
The Humboldt-Box and surrounding park. The open-air deck is visible on the top level of the building.

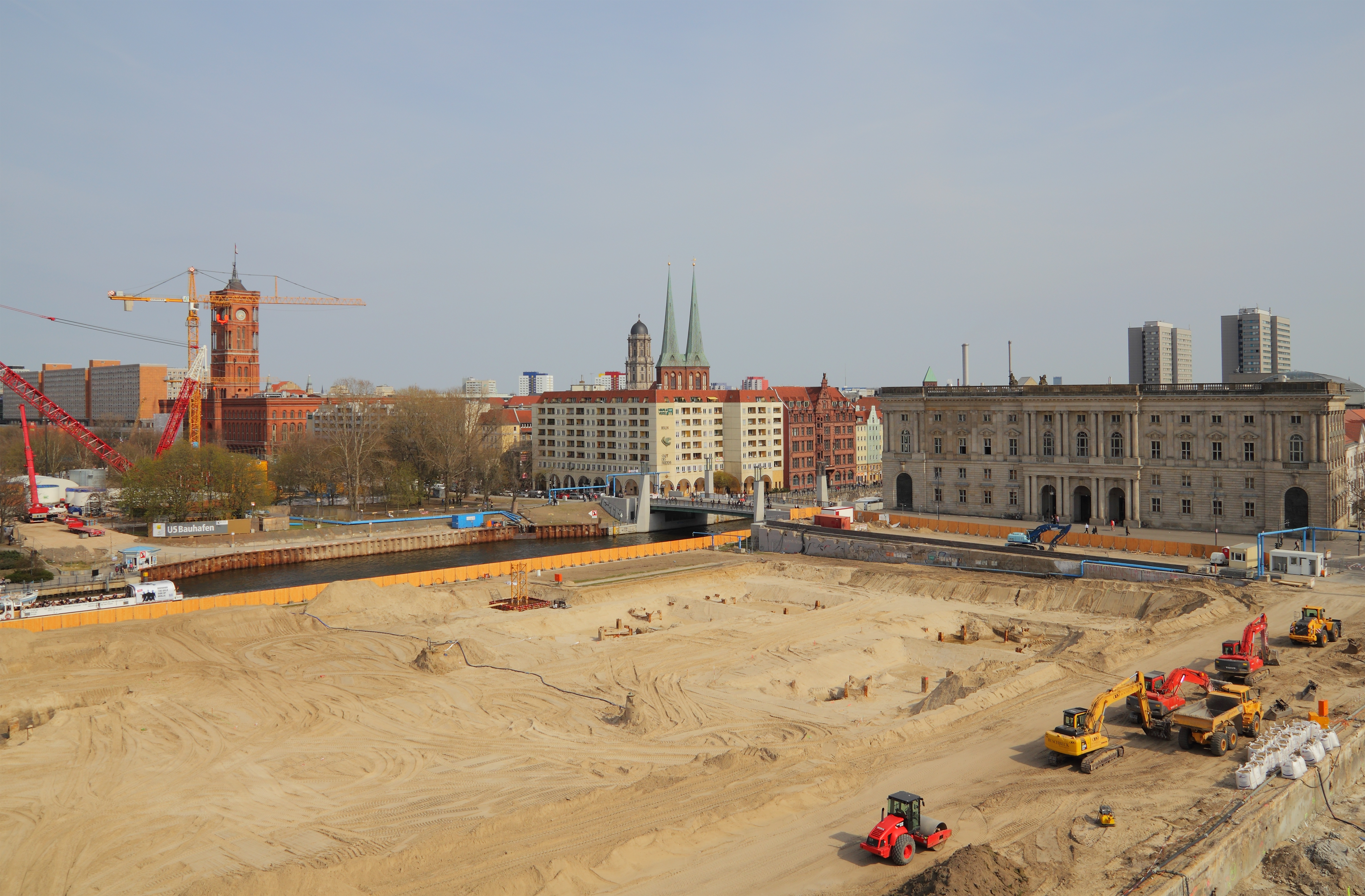
View from the Humboldt Box to the construction site of the replica of Berlin Palace, April 2013

The Humboldt Box was built as an information centre about plans for a future palace, a viewing platform for its construction site, and a temporary exhibition space for the future tenants. The idea came from a similar structure at Potsdamer Platz, the "Visitor Box on Stilts", which stood at the site of a large construction project there from 1995 to 2001. Hoping to repeat the success of the bright red "box on stilts", which served as an information centre and attracted some nine million visitors, the Friends of the Berlin City Palace and their supporters proposed the Humboldt Box to "win the hearts" of Berliners to the costly and ambitious plan to rebuild the Stadtschloss (Berlin City Palace). Used by Hohenzollern Prussian kings and German Emperors, the imperial palace suffered extensive damage in World War II and was razed in 1950 by the East German government.

The project to rebuild stalled in 2008 amid political and financial disputes. The new City Palace has since been proposed as an extension of the Berlin State Museums and Humboldt University, with modern interiors, but facades and domes resembling the former imperial palace. Renamed Humboldt Forum, the new plan has gained political support and funding, however the Humboldt Box itself was in private ownership, as neither the federal government nor the Berlin Senate wanted to finance it. The company Megaposter was awarded the contract for construction of the Humboldt Box in September 2009, with the financing secured through future advertising revenue. To do this, the fences around the construction site of the new Berlin City Palace would be hired as advertising space, to some controversy.

The City Palace plans have since been formally approved by the Berlin Senate. The new palace, called "the project of a century", once estimated at 550 million euros, is now expected to cost nearly 600 million euros.

== Criticism and praise ==
The Humboldt Box concept has been criticized, especially after postponement of construction of the Humboldt Forum. It has been called an "ugly block" with the "charm of a dumpster"; Thomas Flierl, urban development spokesman for Die Linke Party, feared the box could evolve into a "monument to failure." The newspaper die Tageszeitung described the Box as "the most useless building in the city" and criticized the vague financing. Alfred Grazioli, professor of architecture criticized the planners as being too insensitive to handle the historical site. Hermann Parzinger, President of the Prussian Cultural Heritage Foundation, which sponsored exhibitions in the Humboldt Box, pointed out however, that "the capital can now finally see what it looks like from the Humboldt Forum."

Various quarters also criticized the building's architecture, height and location at the very apex of the boulevard Unter den Linden, stating that the street seemed cordoned off with this construction and the view of the Berlin Cathedral was partially obstructed. The Tagesspiegel called it "an architectural monster in galactic proportions." However, after it opened, World Compact summed up the Box: "a building like this in the center of town, with its asymmetric cubism and bright turquoise color scheme, will naturally provoke criticism, but the public will certainly be quite enthusiastic."
