= Lessing Monument =

Sculpture in Berlin, Germany

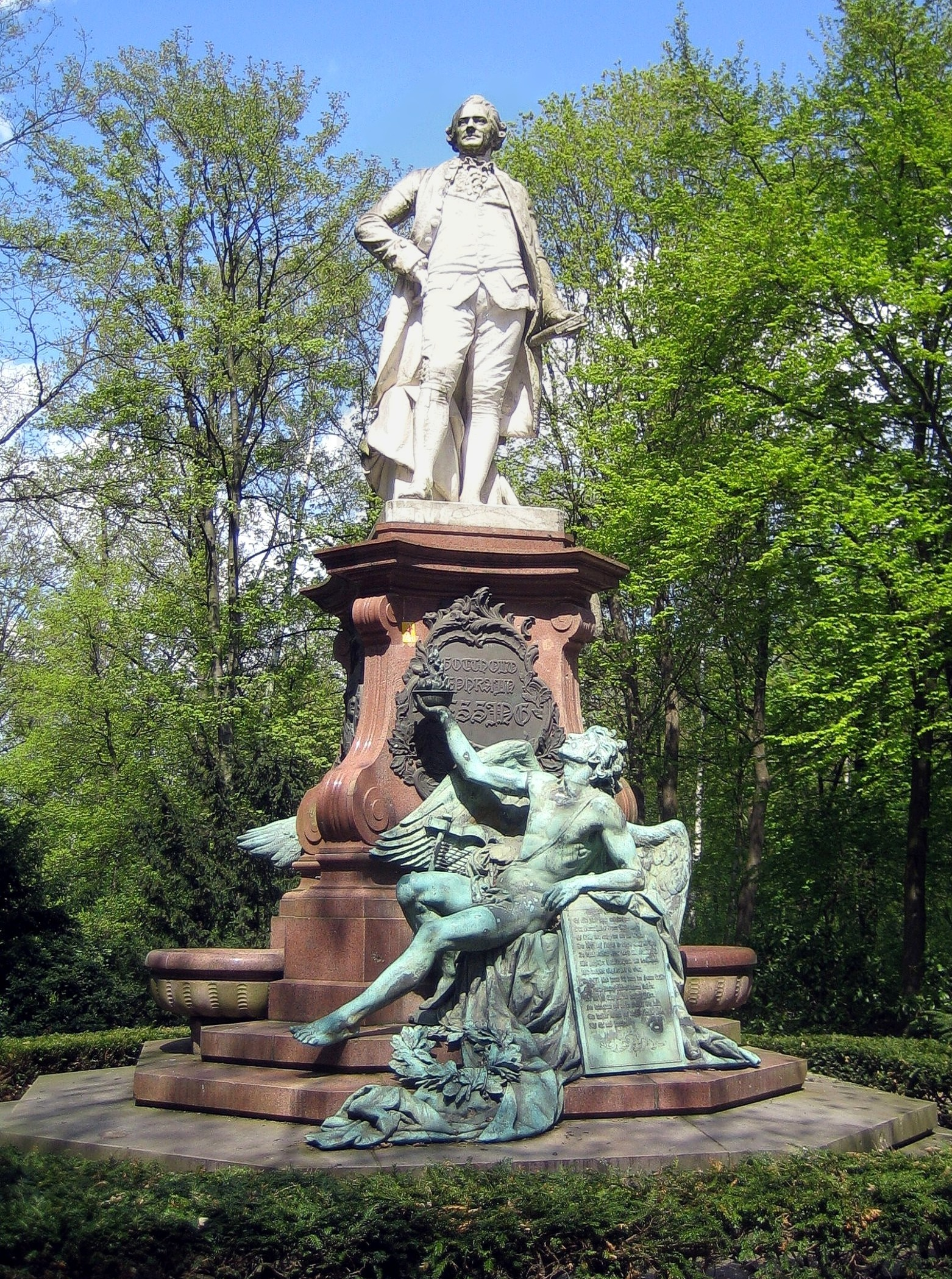
- The monument in 2007
- Artist: Otto Lessing
- Location: Berlin, Germany; 52.5119°N 13.3750°E

The Lessing Monument (German: Lessing-Denkmal) is a monument in the Neo-Baroque style, and dedicated to Gotthold Ephraim Lessing by Otto Lessing, installed at Tiergarten in Berlin, Germany.

== See also ==
- List of works by Otto Lessing
