= Schloßplatz =

Schloßplatz (pre-1996 spelling) or Schlossplatz is a German language word meaning "Palace Square" or "Castle Square". It may refer to:

- Schloßplatz (Berlin)
- Schloßplatz (Dresden)
- Schlossplatz (Oldenburg)
- Schlossplatz (Stuttgart)
- Schloßplatz (Wiesbaden)

== See also ==
- Palace Square
- Castle Square (disambiguation)
