= Neptune Fountain (Berlin) =

Fountain in Berlin, Germany

Neptunbrunnen
- Neptune Fountain
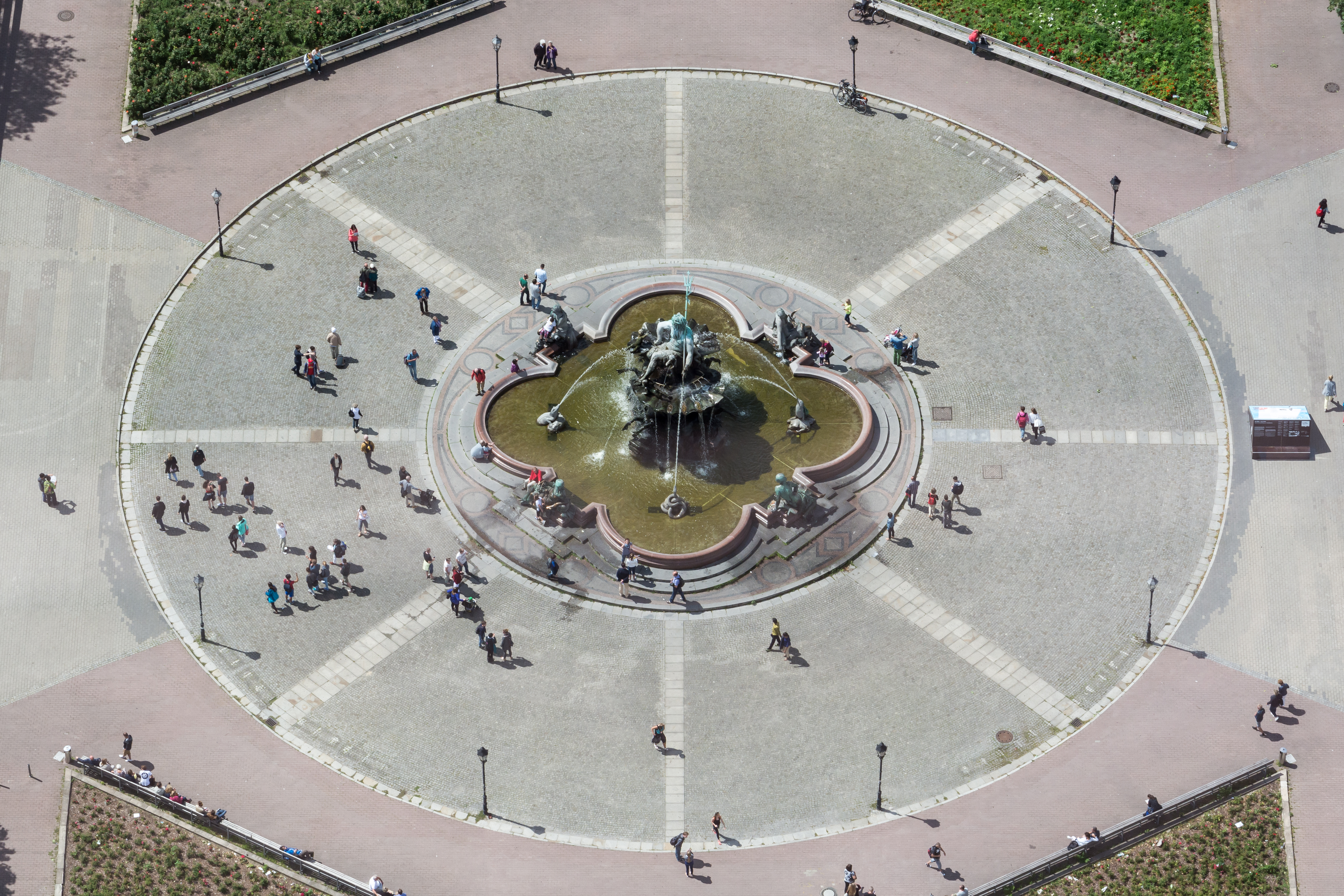
- The square around Neptunbrunnen

- Artist: Reinhold Begas
- Year: 1891
- Subject: Neptune
- Dimensions: 10 m (33 ft); 18 m diameter (59 ft)
- Location: Berlin; 52°31′11″N 13°24′25″E

The Neptune Fountain (German: Neptunbrunnen) in Berlin was built in 1891 and was designed by Reinhold Begas. The Roman god Neptune is in the center. The four women around him represent the four main rivers of Prussia at the time the fountain was constructed: the Elbe (with the allegorical figure holding fruits and ears of corn), Rhine (fishnet and grapes), Vistula (wooden blocks, symbols of forestry), and Oder (goats and animal skins). The Vistula is now entirely in Poland, while the Oder forms the border between Germany and Poland.

The fountain was removed from its original location at the Schlossplatz in 1951, when the former Berliner Schloss (Berlin Palace) there was demolished. Eventually, after being restored, the fountain was moved in 1969 to its present location between St. Mary's Church and Rotes Rathaus.

The diameter is 18 m (59 ft), the height is 10 m (33 ft).

== Gallery ==
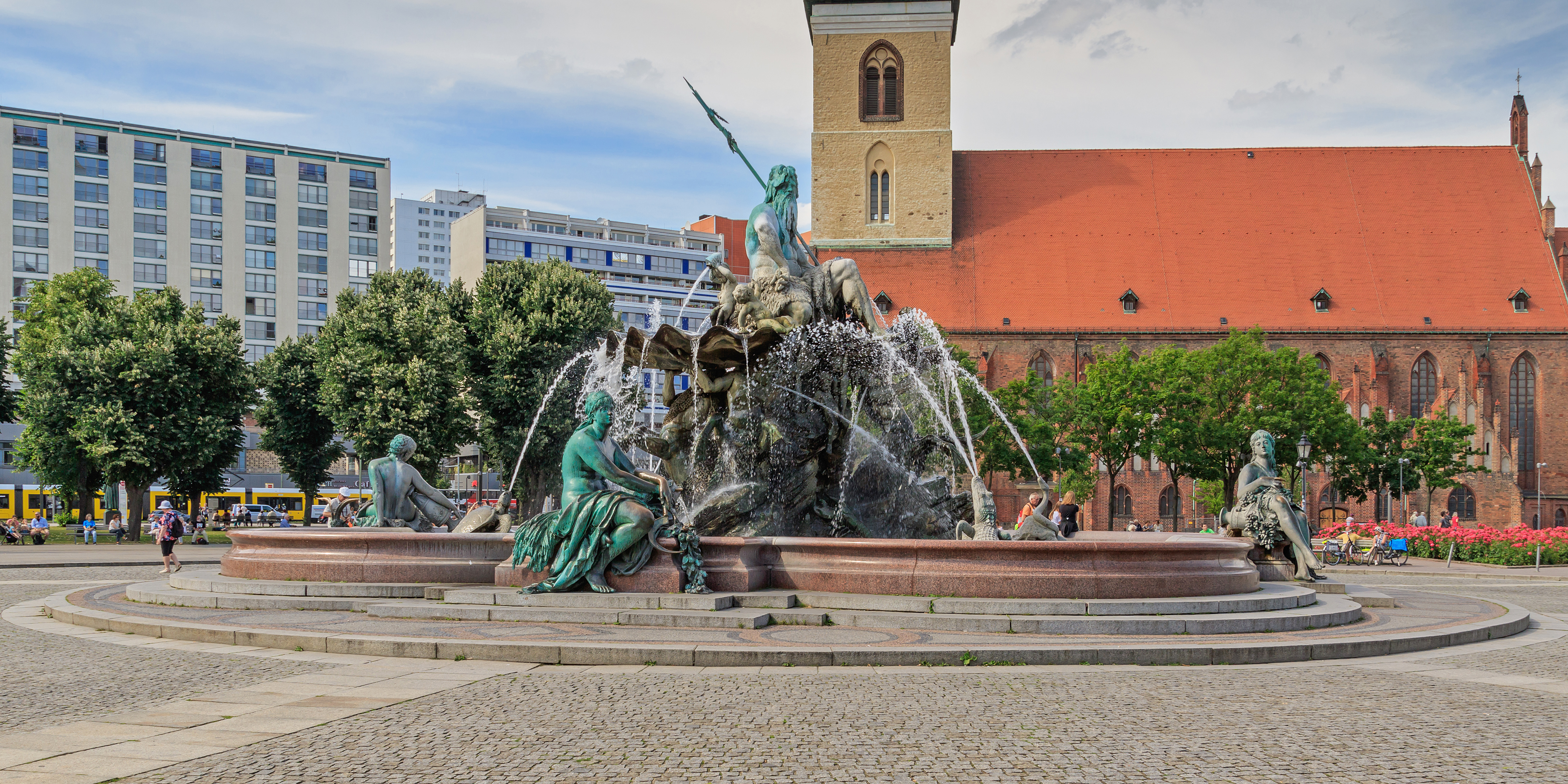
Neptunbrunnen with St. Mary's Church

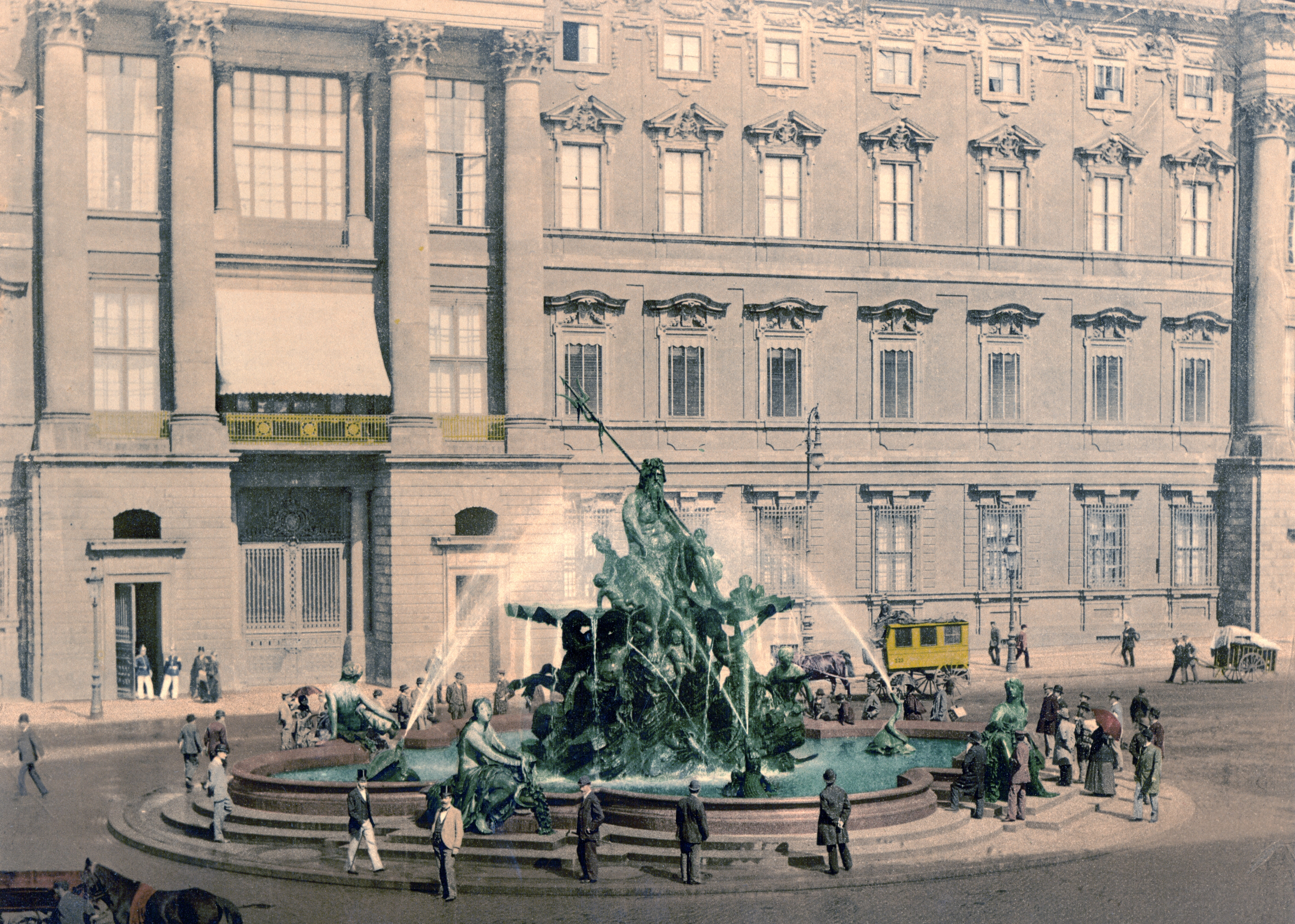
Neptunbrunnen on the Schlossplatz and Berlin Palace (c. 1900)

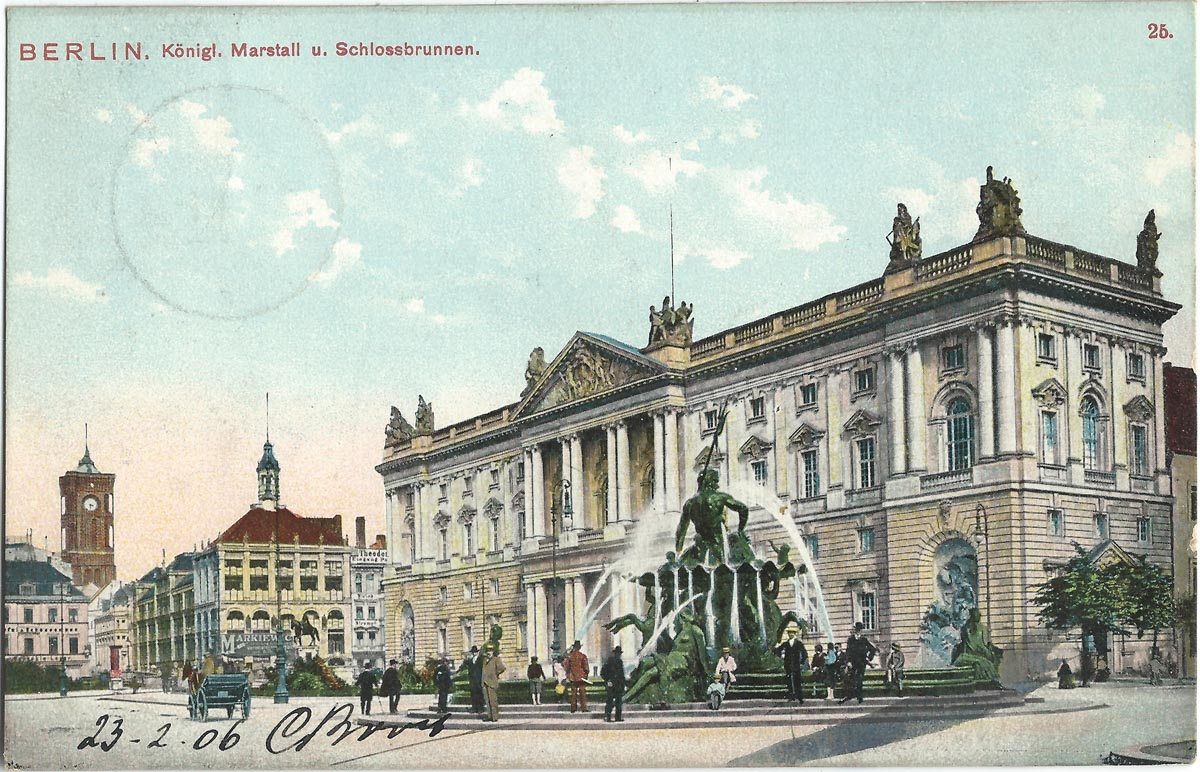
Neptunbrunnen on the Schlossplatz and Neuer Marstall (c. 1900)

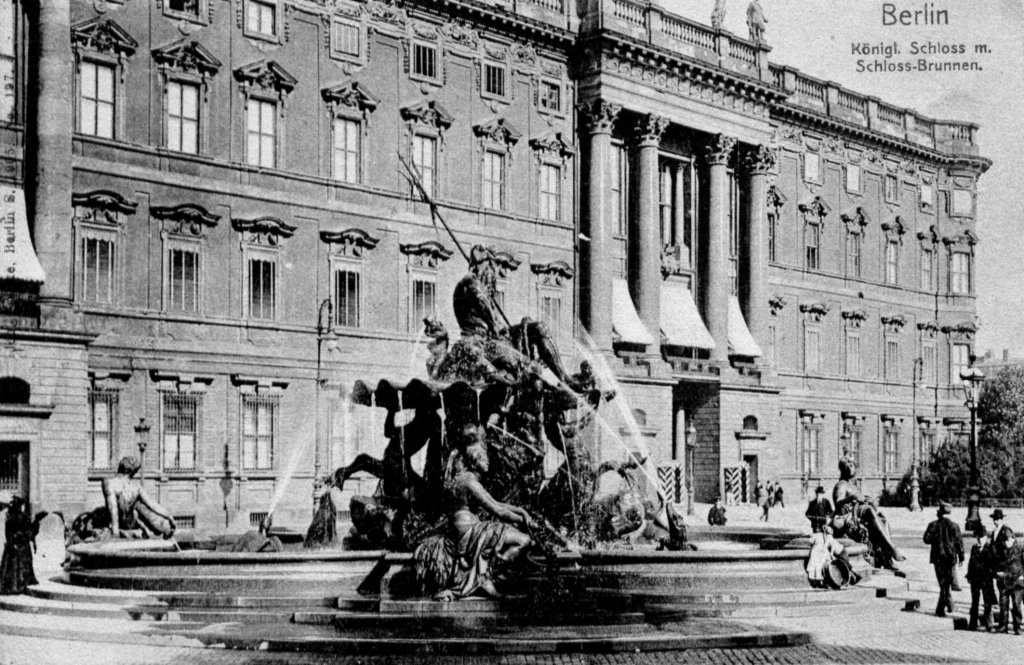
Neptunbrunnen on the Schlossplatz and Berlin Palace (c. 1905)

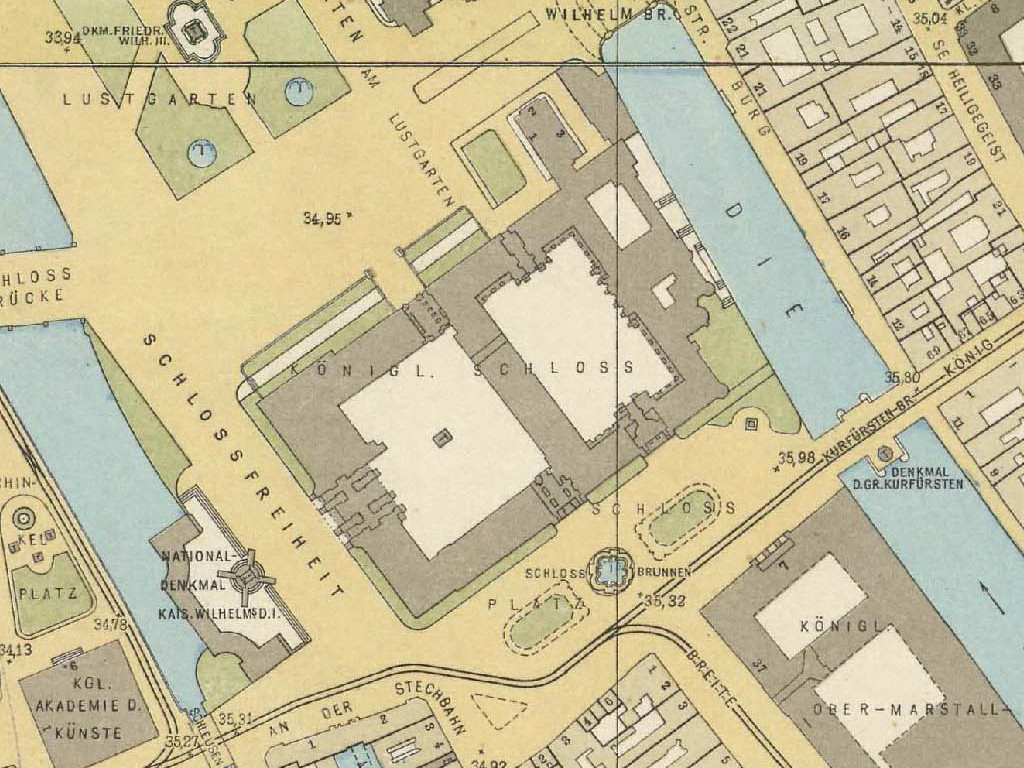
Old map with Neptunbrunnen on the Schlossplatz as SCHLOSS BRUNNEN, 1910

== Events ==
In 2013, a member of the Berlin Police shot an armed man before the fountain. The 31-year-old man was nude, holding a knife, and was believed to be mentally disturbed.
