= Schloßplatz (Berlin) =

Square in Berlin, Germany

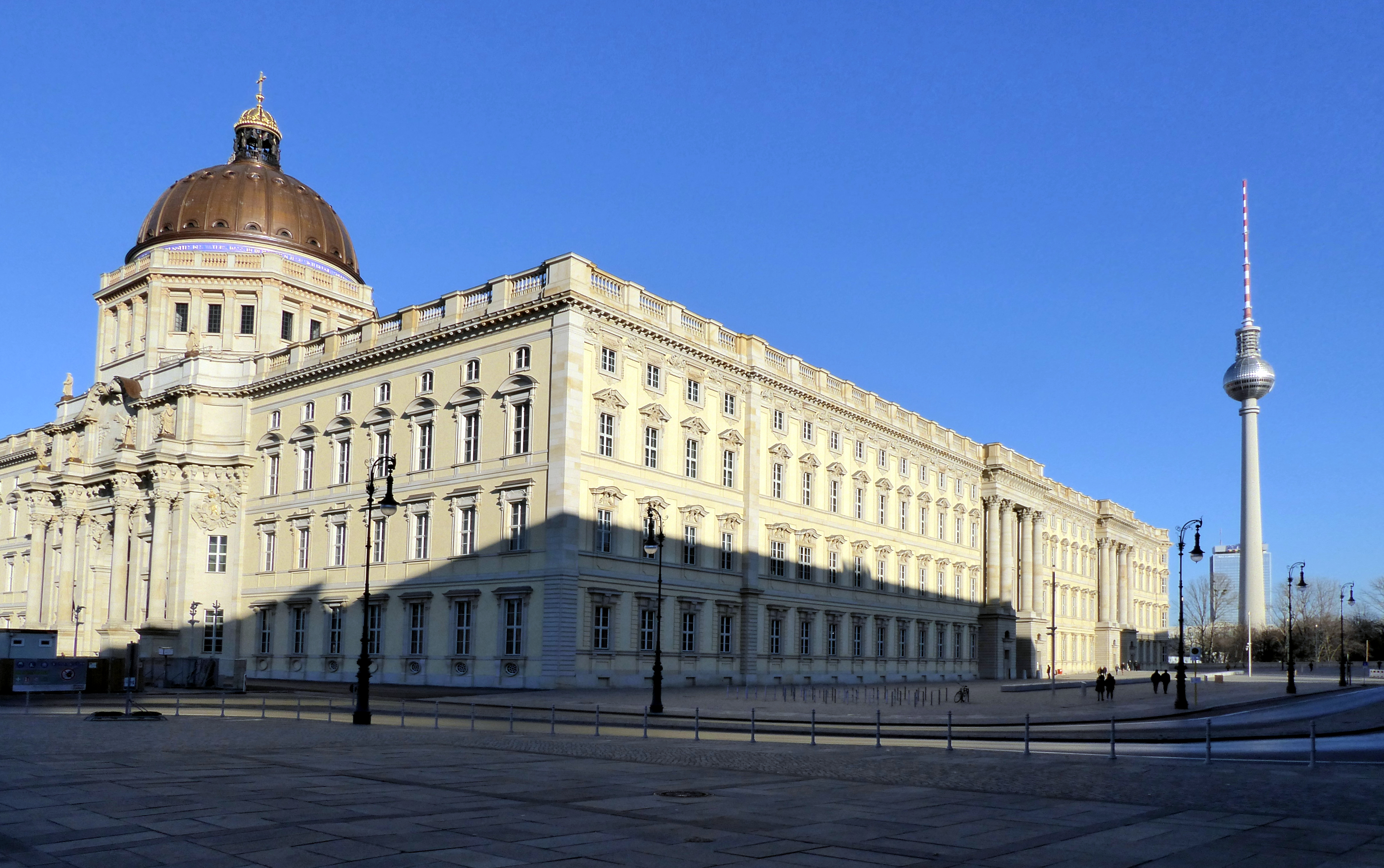
- The Schloßplatz and Berlin Palace in 2020
- Interactive map of Schloßplatz
- Former names: Schloßplatz; (to 1951); Marx-Engels-Platz; (1951–1994)
- Namesake: Berlin Palace
- Type: Public square
- Location: Berlin, Germany
- Quarter: Mitte
- Nearest metro station: Museumsinsel
- Coordinates: 52°31′03″N 13°24′10″E
- Major junctions: Unter den Linden; Werderscher Markt; Breite Straße; Karl-Liebknecht-Straße; Rathausstraße

Schloßplatz (German: [ˈʃlɔsˌplats], "Palace Square" or "Castle Square") is a square located on Museum Island (Museumsinsel) in Berlin, Germany. The square was restored in 2017-2023 in connection with the reconstruction of the Berlin Palace (Berliner Schloss) as the home of the Humboldt Forum. It measures about 225 m by 175 m, with its long side oriented on an axis approximately southwest/northeast. At its west corner is the Schlossbrücke (Palace Bridge), from which Unter den Linden leads west to the Brandenburg Gate. From the same corner, Karl-Liebknecht-Straße runs northeast alongside the square and on to Alexanderplatz. Until the early 20th century, only the square south of the palace was so named, the square north of it being the Lustgarten.

"Schloßplatz" is also a common name for squares in many German-speaking countries. Other cities which have a Schloßplatz include Frankfurt am Main, Stuttgart, Munich and Dresden.

== History ==
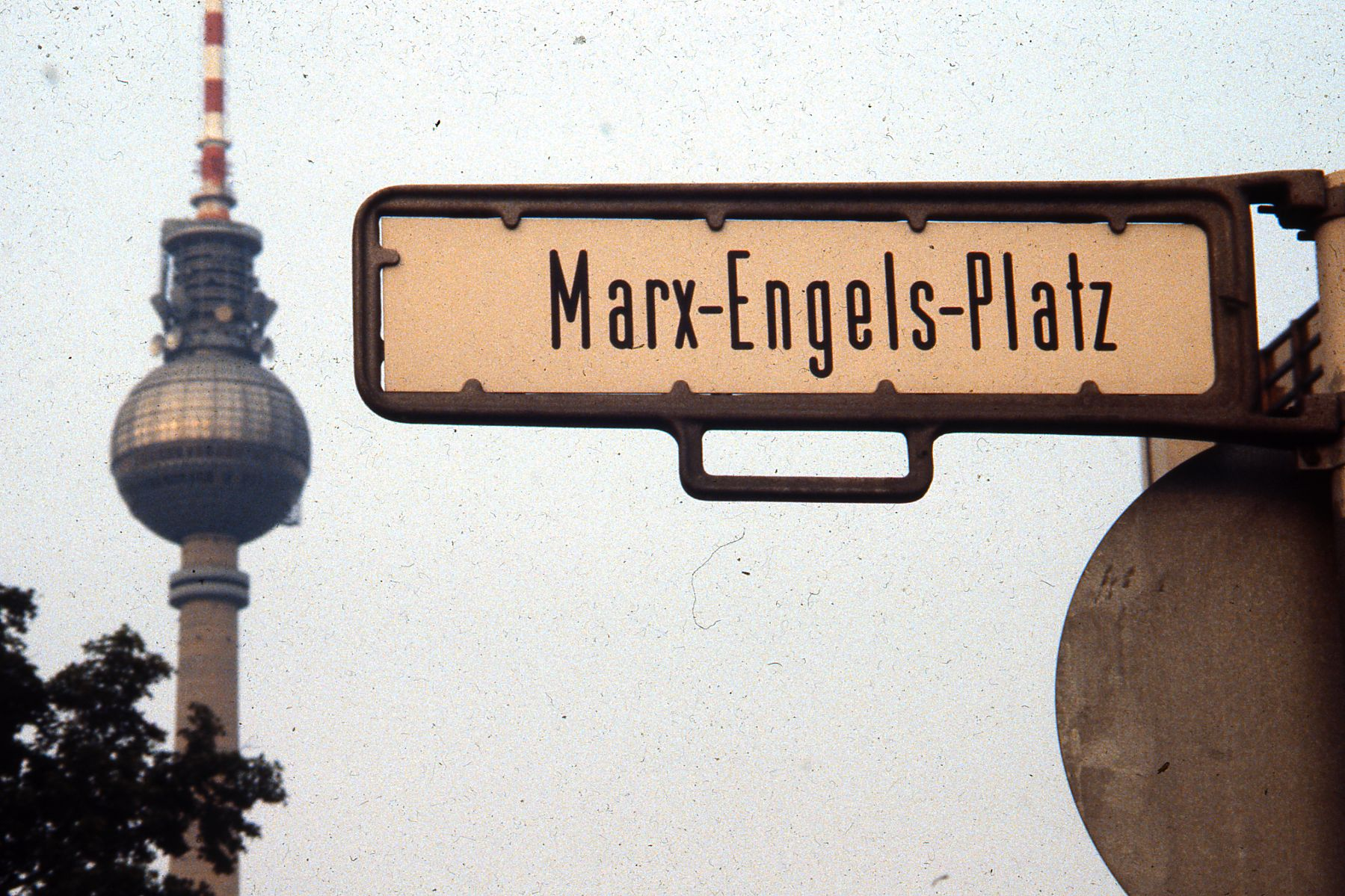
East Berlin street sign for Marx-Engels-Platz, with the Berlin Television Tower in the background

It was the site of the Berliner Stadtschloss (Berlin City Palace). From 1949 to 1990 it was part of East Berlin, the capital of East Germany. In 1950, the remains of the city palace were blown up, and in 1951 the square was renamed Marx-Engels-Platz (Marx-Engels Square) after Karl Marx and Friedrich Engels. New buildings erected included the Palast der Republik, the Council of State building, and the Foreign Ministry building. The Council of State building contains a balcony from the former city palace, where Karl Liebknecht proclaimed a socialist republic on November 9, 1918. The Soviet Army's repression of the East German uprising of 1953 began on the square, when Soviet soldiers fired at East Germans trying to climb onto a T-34 tank.

Following German reunification in 1990, the name Schloßplatz was restored in 1994.

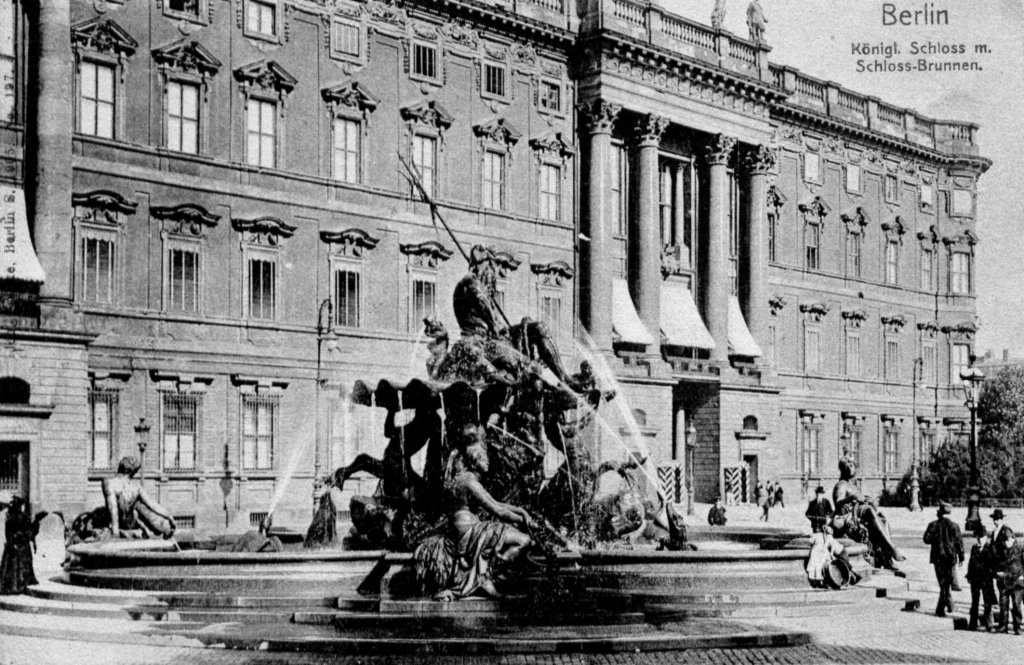
Schloßplatz with the Berlin City Palace in 1905. The Neptunbrunnen is in the foreground.

The Palast der Republik was originally scheduled to be demolished in 2005-06, but this was delayed, and a series of conceptual and performance art events were held in the Palast during the period of reprieve. Demolition of Palast der Republik was completed in 2008.

A temporary exhibition venue Temporäre Kunsthalle Berlin was then constructed on the western side of the Schloßplatz and held a number of contemporary art exhibitions over the following two years.

Between 2012 and 2020 the Stadtschloss palace was rebuilt with three replica façades on north, west and south, a replica courtyard, and a modern interior and eastern facade. It houses a conference centre and several museum collections of the Humboldt Forum, which opened online on 16 December 2020.

The music video for the song 'Ich Will' (I Want) by the German band Rammstein was filmed in this location.

== Gallery ==
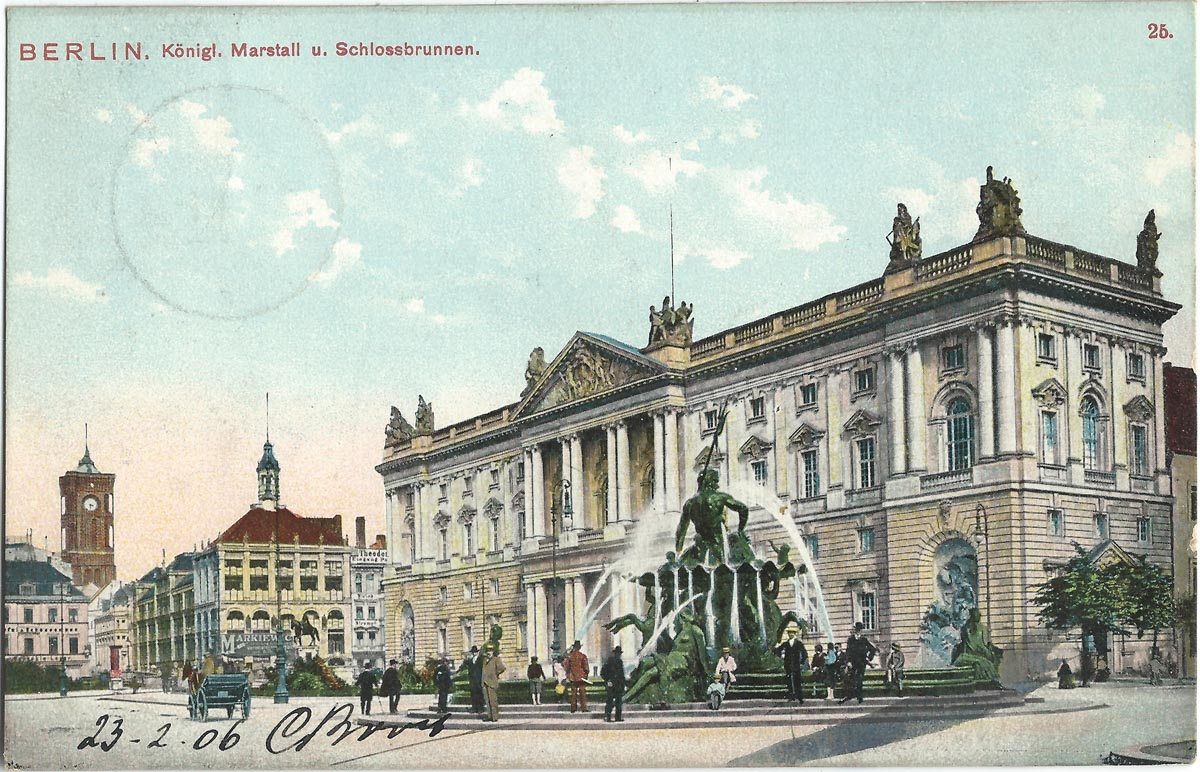
Schloßplatz with Neuer Marstall and Neptunbrunnen, c. 1900

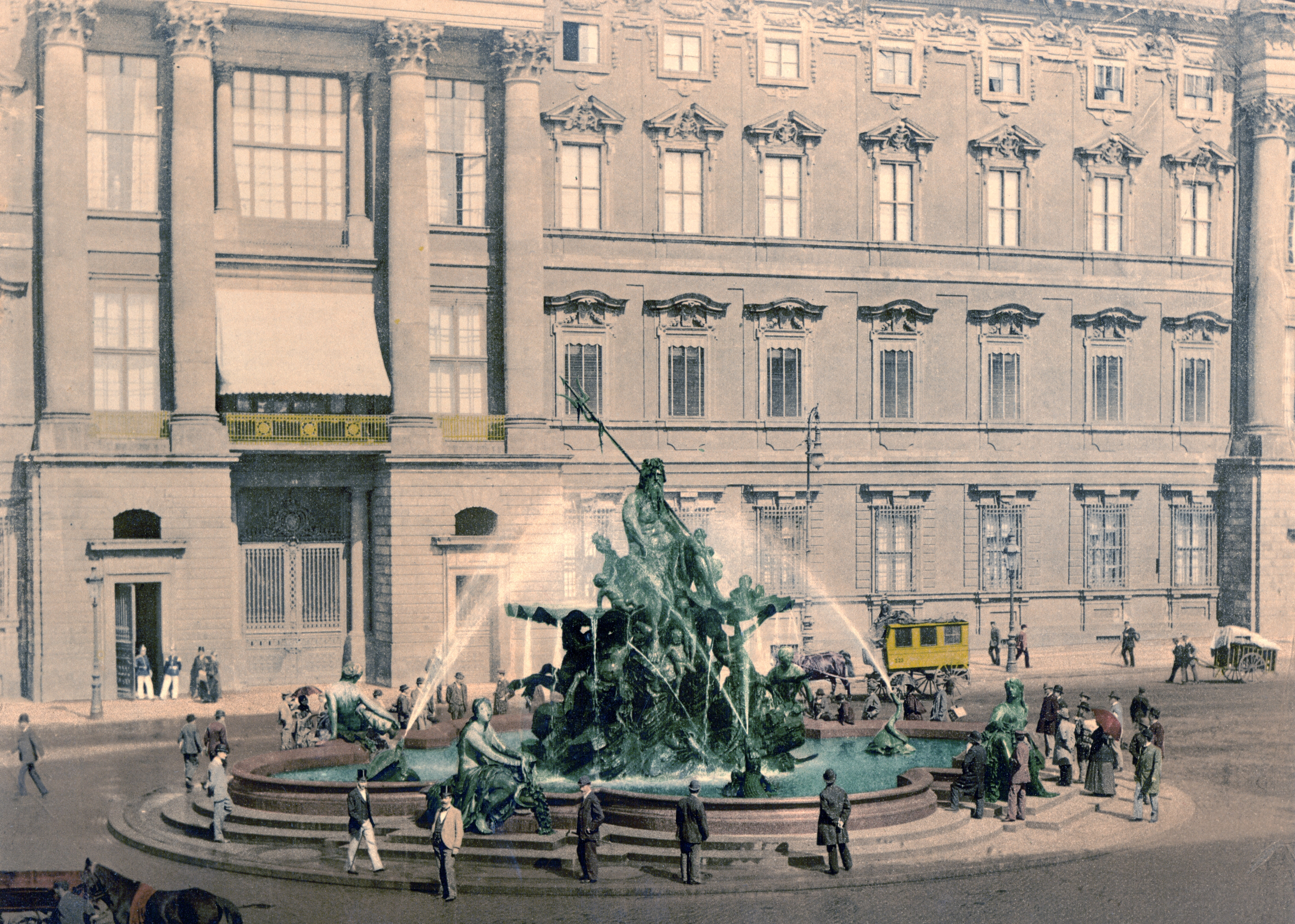
Schloßplatz with Neptunbrunnen and Berlin Palace, c. 1900

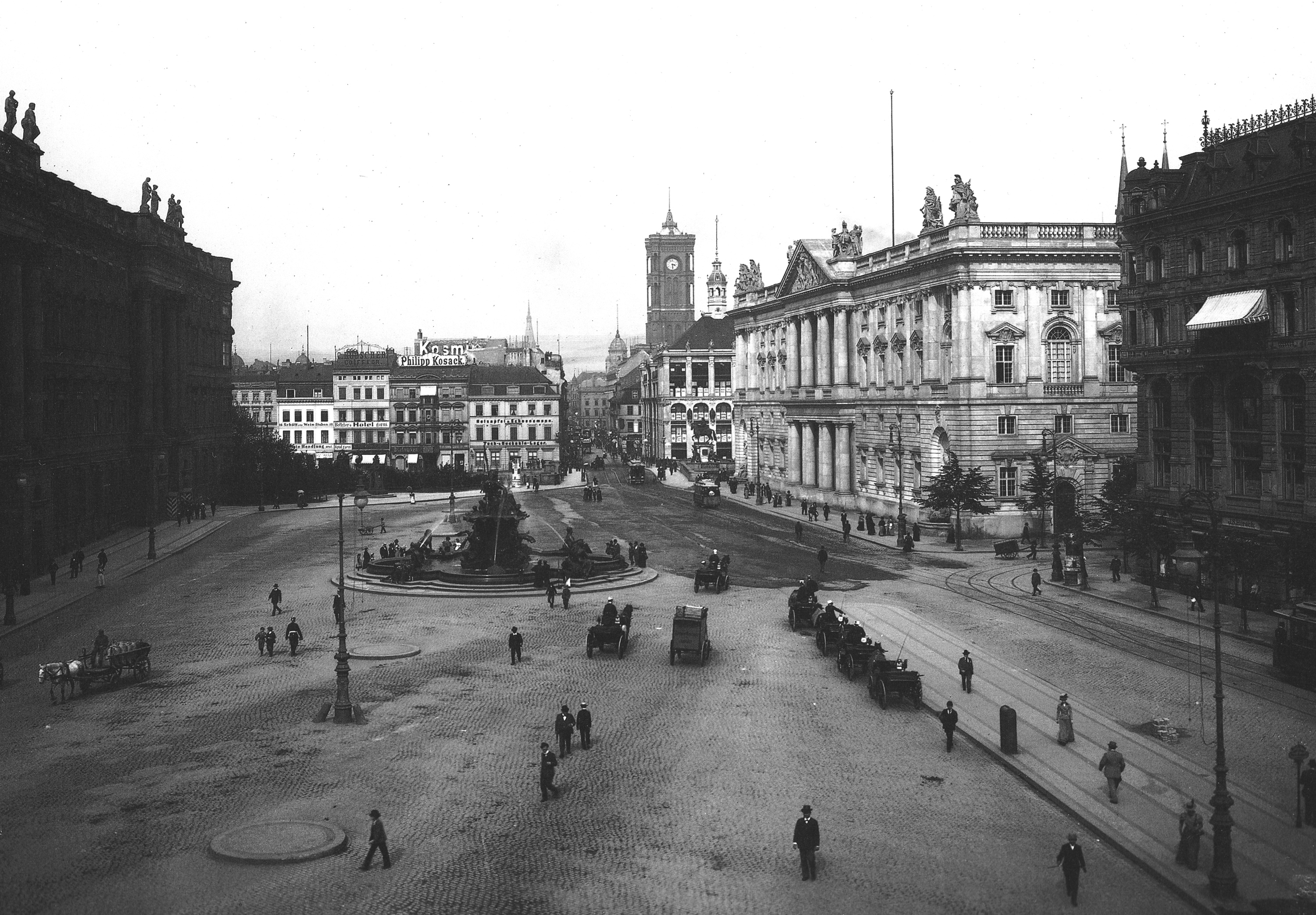
Schloßplatz, 1900

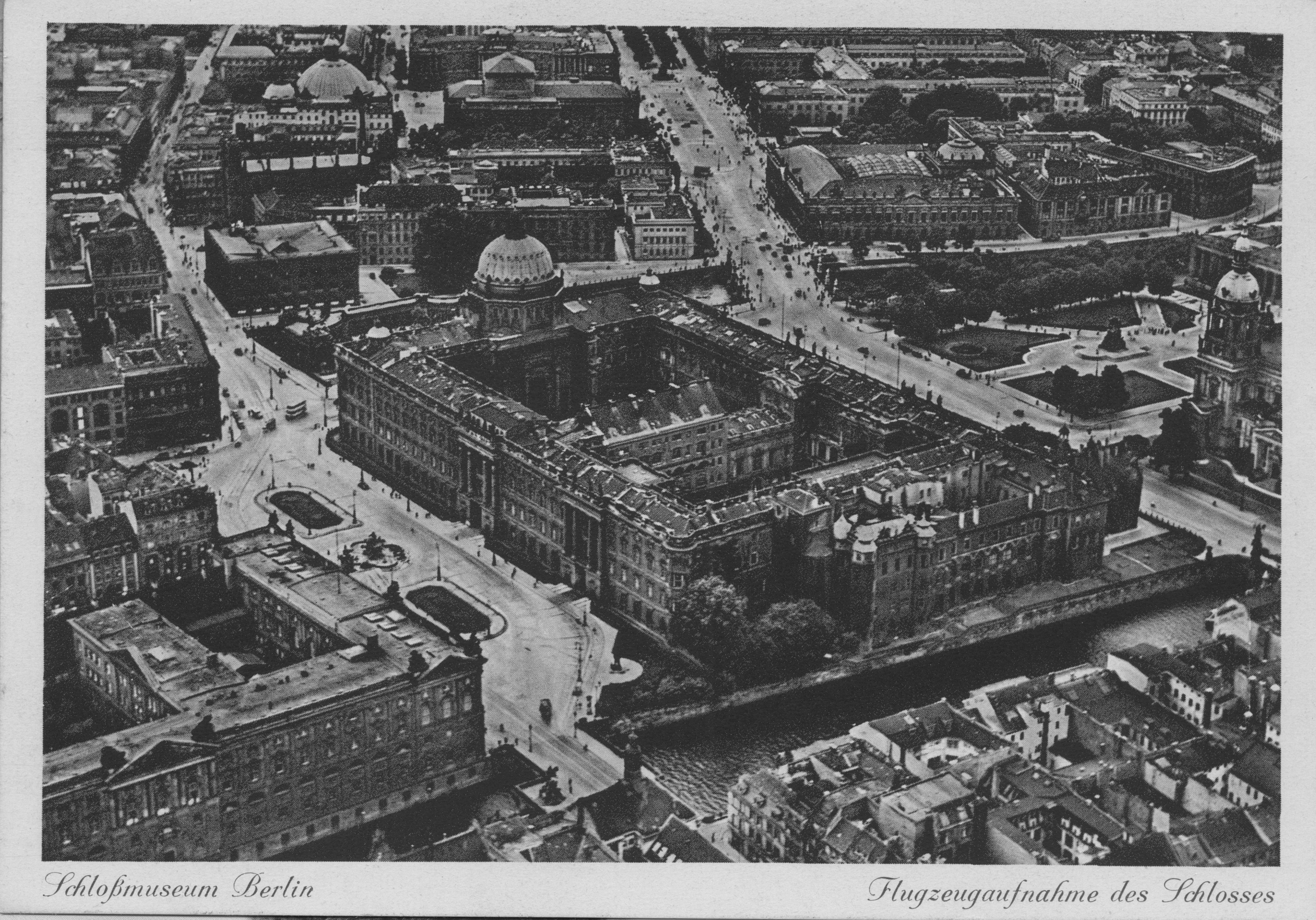
Aerial view, c. 1900

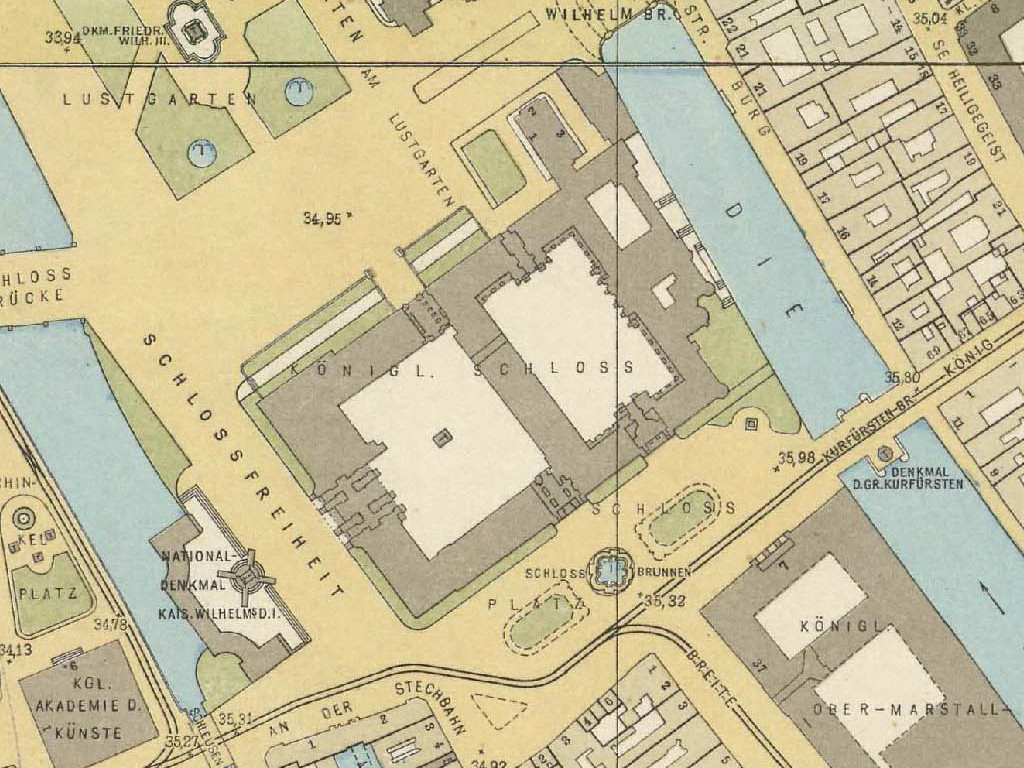
Old map, 1910

== See also ==
- Humboldt Box
- Neuer Marstall
