= Otto Lessing (sculptor) =

German sculptor

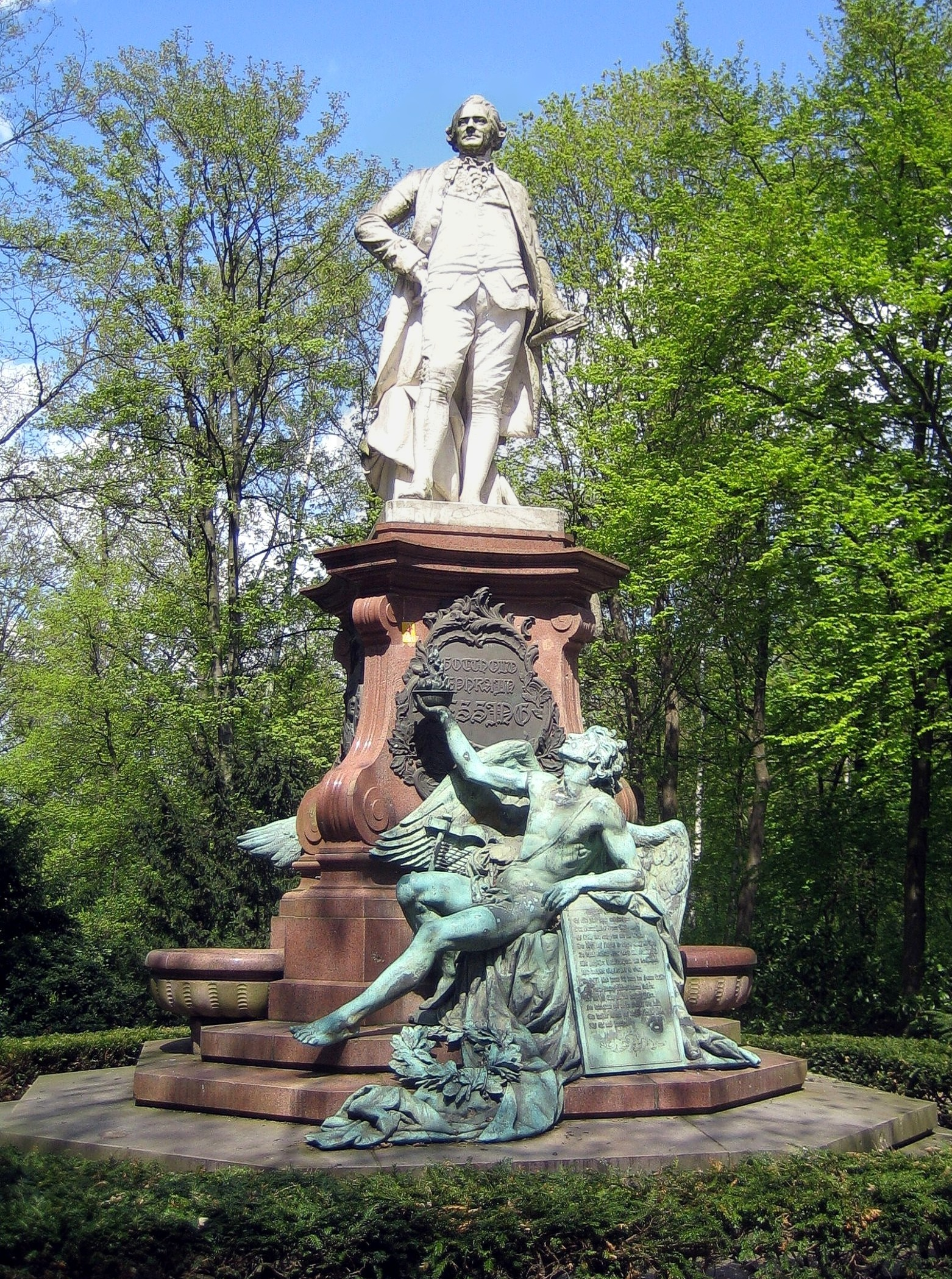
Lessing Monument in the Großer Tiergarten, Berlin

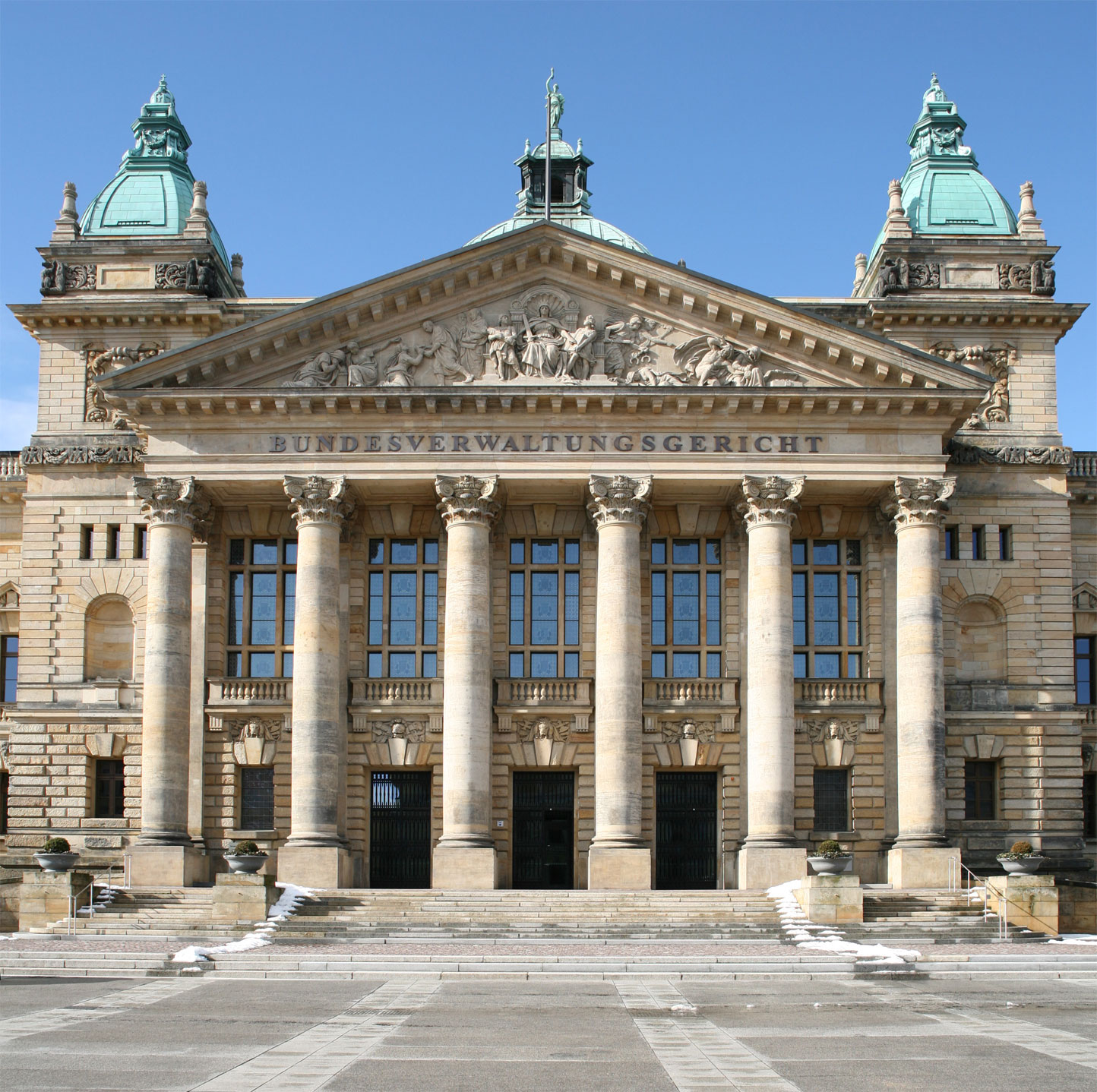
Gable and sculptures on the Reich Court building (now the German Federal Administrative Court), Leipzig

Gables and Statuary at the Deutscher Dom, as well as interiors

Otto Lessing (24 February 1846 – 22 November 1912) was a prominent German Historicist sculptor whose work largely shaped the appearance of Berlin in the late 19th and early 20th centuries. He was the son of history and landscape painter Carl Friedrich Lessing and the great great nephew of poet Gotthold Ephraim Lessing.

Lessing created sculpture and decorative architectural elements on the façades and interiors of many important buildings in Germany, such as the Reichstag, Berlin Cathedral and the Reich Court building (Supreme Court) in Leipzig. In addition to large public contracts, he also designed commercial buildings and residential villas. At the height of his career in 1911, Lessing was appointed to the Senate of the Prussian Academy of Arts and awarded the Pour le Mérite in Science and Arts (German: Pour le mérite für Wissenschaft und Künste), Germany's highest civilian decoration.

== Life ==
Otto Lessing was born in Düsseldorf. His artistic education began with his father, who instructed him in painting. He then studied sculpture from 1863 to 1865 under Carl Johann Steinhäuser at the Kunstschule Karlsruhe and then from 1865 to 1868 with Albert Wolff in Berlin. After these years of training Lessing returned to Karlsruhe, where he worked at Steinhäuser's studio until 1872.

Lessing married Sigrid Gude, daughter of Hans Gude in Christiania in 1875.

At the founding of the German Empire, with the choice of Berlin as imperial capital, Lessing hoped for a busy career and in the autumn of 1872 moved to Berlin. There he opened a studio for decorative sculpture at Wartburgstraße 14 in Schöneberg. The then unknown sculptor benefited from recommendations of his uncle Robert Carl Lessing, principal owner of the Vossische Zeitung with contacts with influential politicians and artists. Lessing's father also moved to Berlin in 1880 and bought himself a prestigious residence in the Tiergarten district.

Lessing's reputation and success grew continuously in the late 19th century. In 1890, he was accepted into the Society of Berlin Architects and became their favored sculptor. From this association he received commissions for sculptures and reliefs on the façades of many prominent buildings, such as the Reichstag, the Berlin City Palace and the cathedral. In addition to large public commissions, Lessing also designed sculptures for commercial buildings and many of the villas of the new middle class in the capitol.

Lessing also designed monumental standalone sculptures. Between 1886 and 1890 he created a monument to his great-great uncle, Gotthold Ephraim Lessing, on the Lennéstraße in the Tiergarten. During its inauguration on 14 October 1890, Lessing was awarded the title of a professor and a short time later took a teaching position at the Institute of the Museum of Decorative Arts in Berlin. He moved to Wangenheimstraße 10 in the new neighborhood of Berlin Grunewald, where he built a large studio. He died on 22 November 1912 and is buried in the Friedhof Halensee-Grunewald, in a tomb he designed himself.

== Painting and sculpture ==
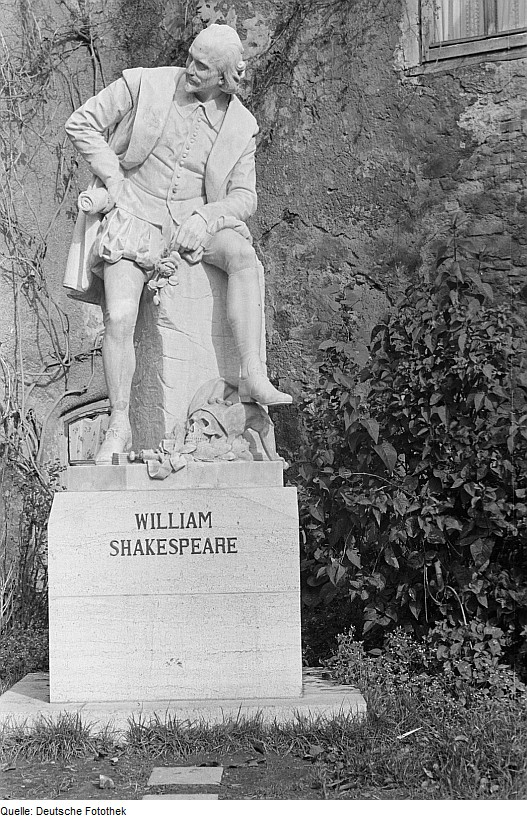
Lessing's Statue of Shakespeare in the Park an der Ilm, Weimar.

Otto Lessing's sculpture and architectural decoration adorns many historic government buildings in Germany, such as the Prussian House of Lords, Reichstag (German Imperial Parliament), the Neuer Marstall (Imperial Stables), and the Reichsgericht (Supreme Court in Leipzig). His interior work includes the bronze doors in the Hall of Honor at the Zeughaus (Berlin Armory) and striking glass mosaics inside the Martin-Gropius-Bau. Lessing's religious works include the three main doors and interior reliefs at the Berliner Dom, portals and interiors of the Deutscher Dom, the Emperor's entrance to Kaiser-Wilhelm-Gedächtniskirche and the interior of St. Michaelis Church, Hamburg. The Borsig Palace is an example of his work for private residences. The Berlin State Library and Konzerthaus Berlin are also decorated by Lessing.

Among his most important outdoor monuments are the Lessing Monument (1890) in the Tiergarten, the Hercules Fountain in the Lützowplatz (1910), and statues in the Siegesallee. His statue of Shakespeare in Weimar is a German icon of the author, as one critic put it, "seated and staring into the distance with a bemused and thoughtful look". Many buildings with his works were severely damaged in World War II and several were later demolished, such as former British Embassy Palais Strousberg, the Reich Chancellory and Berlin City Palace.

== Writings ==
Lessing's published writings include:

- Ausgefuehrte Bauornamente der Neuzeit. Sammlung hervorragender Ornamentausfuehrungen. Berlin: Wasmuth, 1880.
- Bauornamente der Neuzeit. Berlin: Wasmuth, 1881.
- Bauornamente Berlins. 100 Tafeln. (2 editions) Berlin: Wasmuth, 1890.
- Schloss Ansbach: Barock- und Roccoco-Dekorationen aus dem XVIII. Jahrhundert Berlin: Wasmuth, 1892.

== Gallery ==
Examples of Lessing's architectural and decorative sculpture:

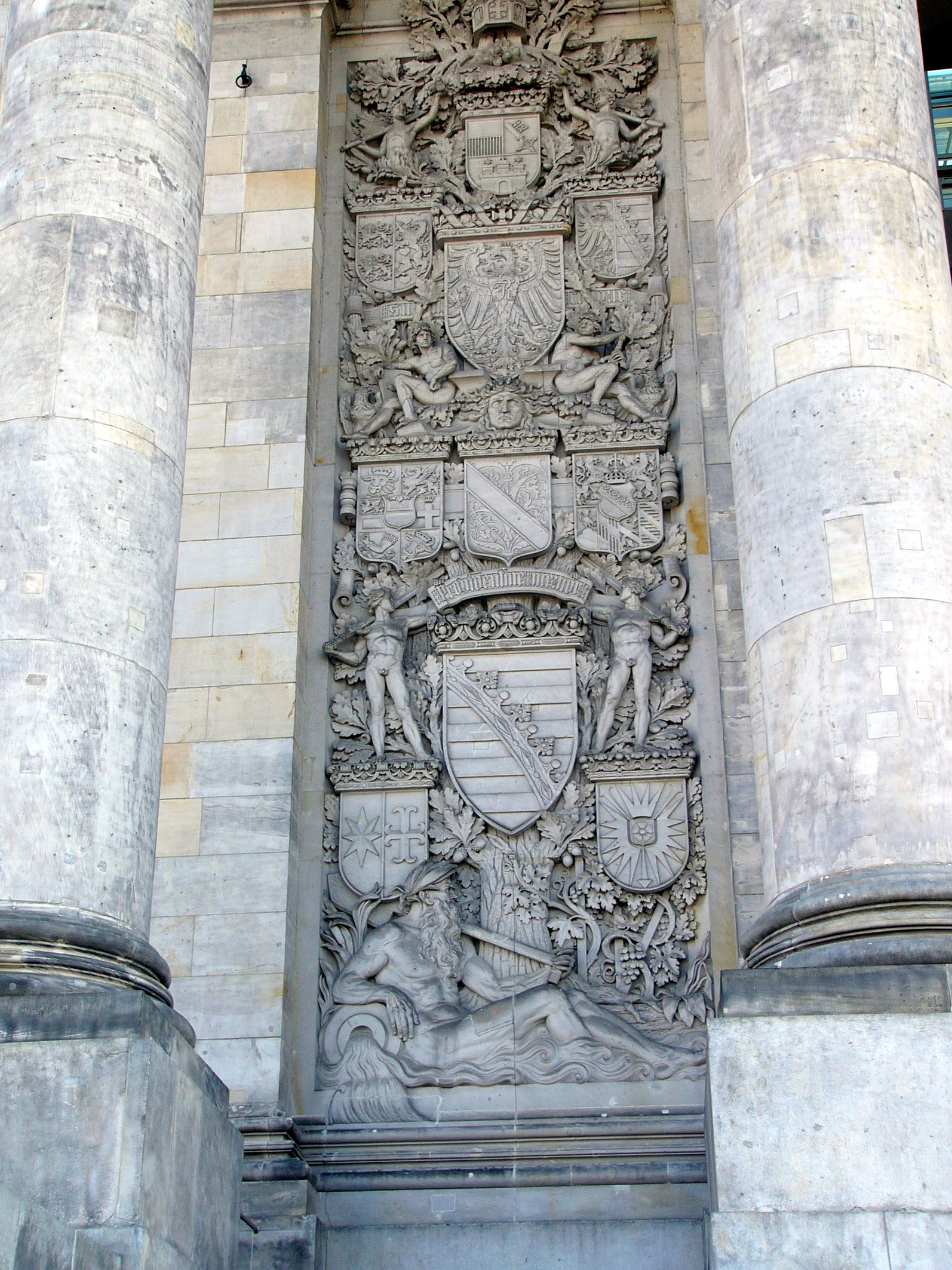
Exterior facade of the Reichstag, Berlin

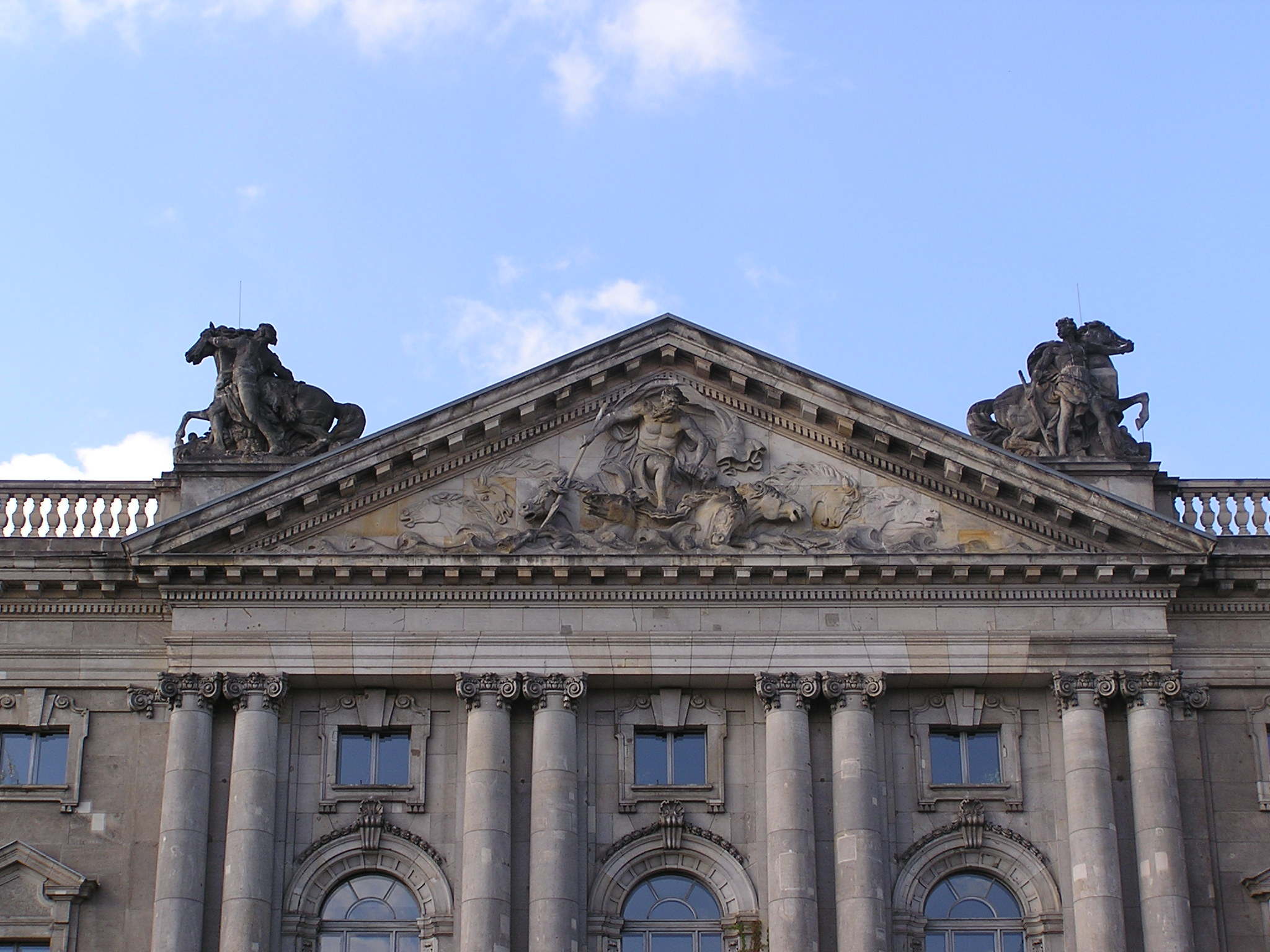
Gable and sculpture The Horse Tamers, Neuer Marstall, Berlin

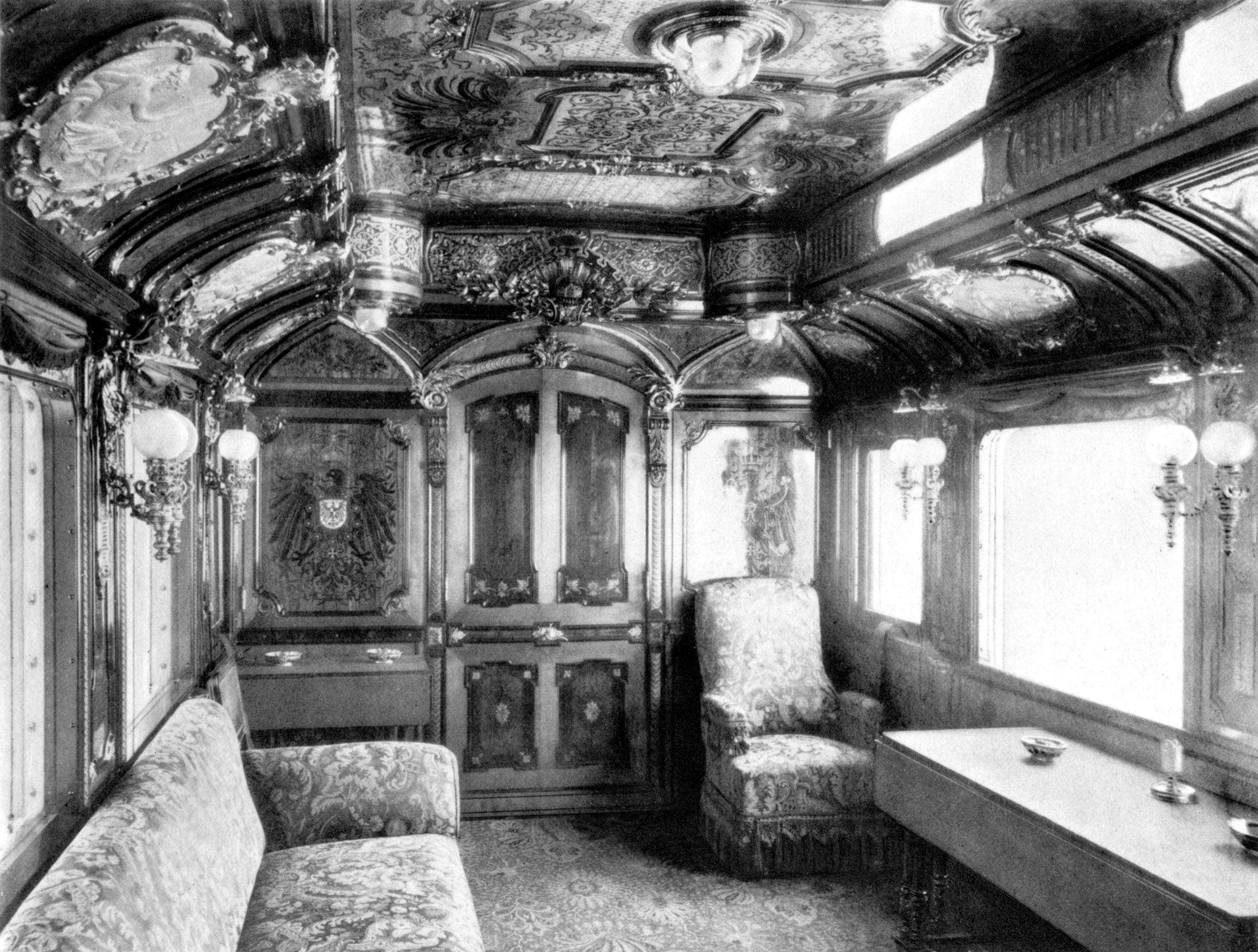
The interior of the Salon railway car of Kaiser Wilhelm II

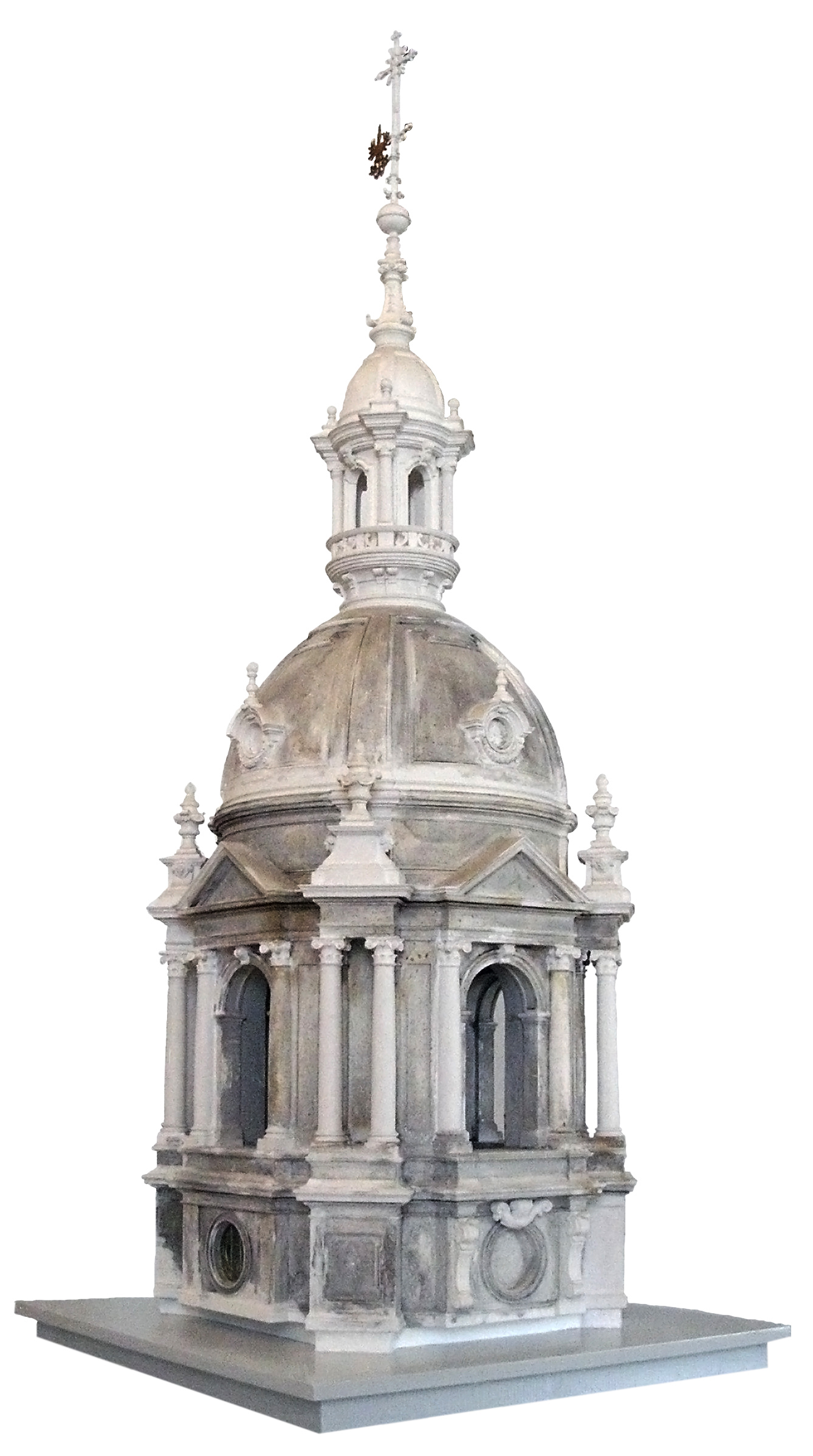
Belltower of the Berliner Dom
