= Castle Street, Gibraltar =

Street in Gibraltar

Coordinates: 5.35213°N 36.14176°E

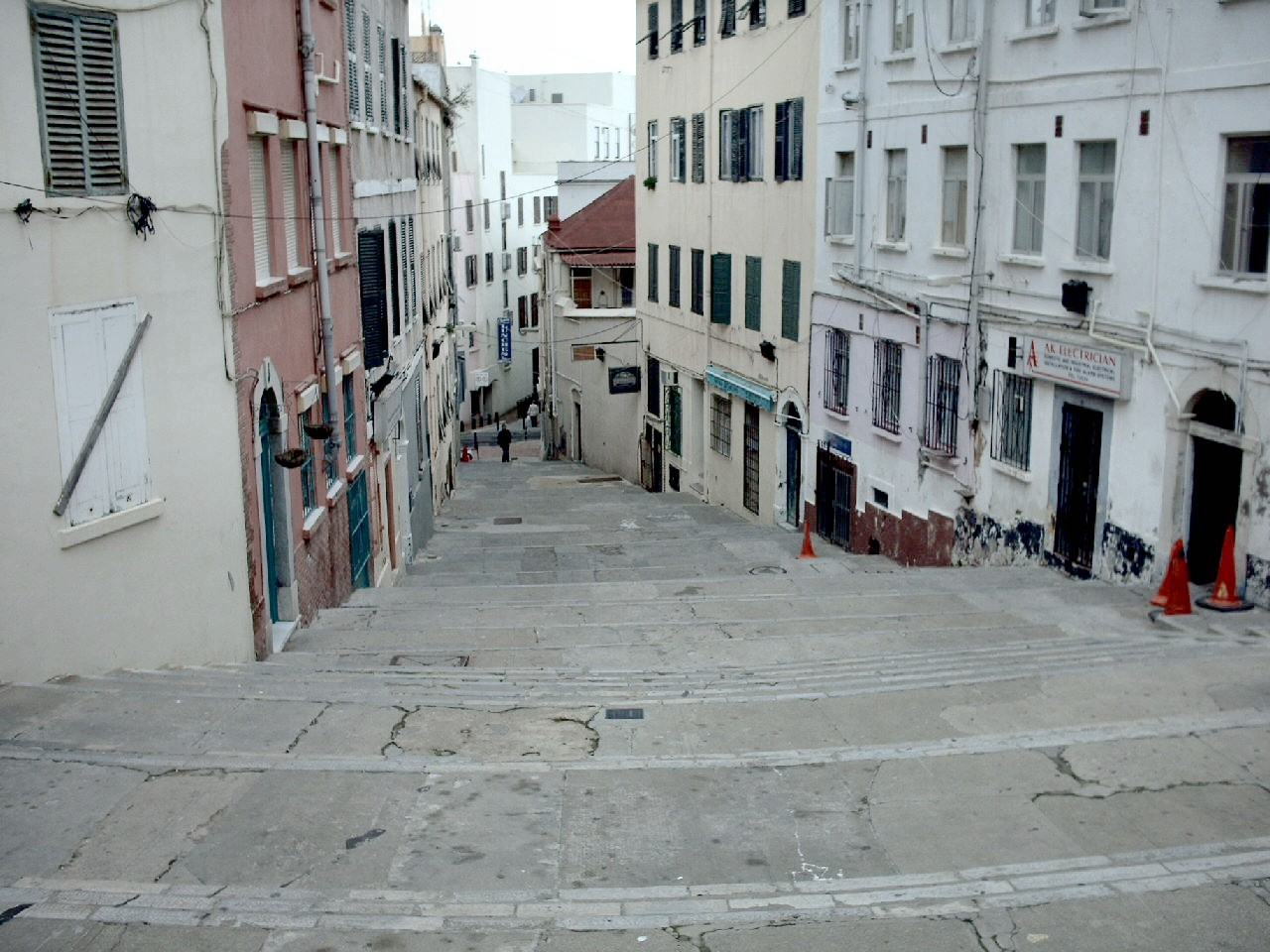
Castle Street

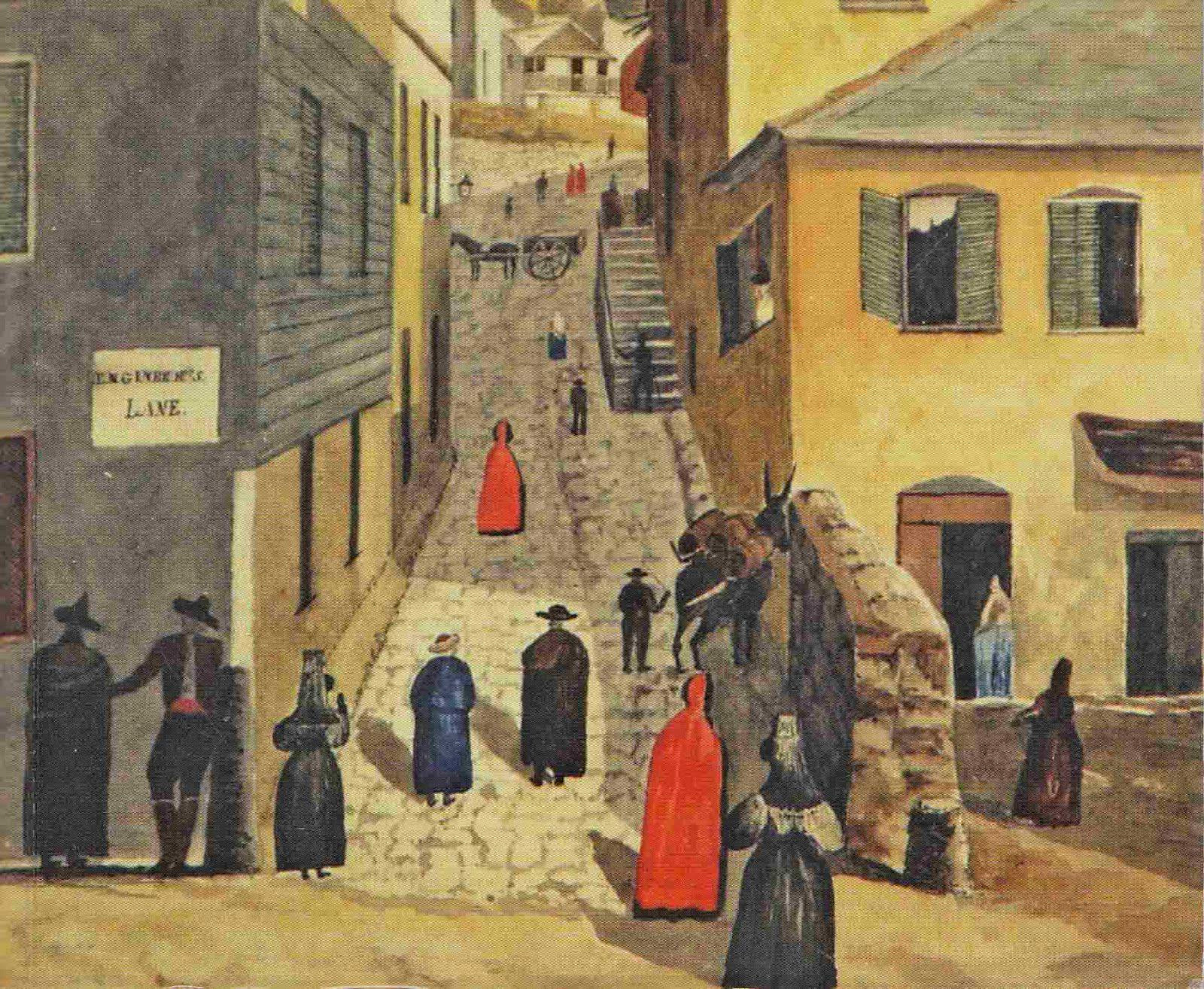
Castle Street in 1833

Castle Street (Calle de la Cuesta or more popularly Calle Comedia) is a street of the British Overseas Territory of Gibraltar. It runs to the east of the town, to the north of Flat Bastion Road.

The street is also known as Calle Comedia as in the 19th century the street had a theatre in what had been a Real Tennis Court which was used for entertainment. This theatre was in use until the Theatre Royal was built at Governor's Parade.
