= Neuer Marstall =

Historic building in Berlin, Germany

Coordinates: 52°31′0.37″N 13°24′13.26″E

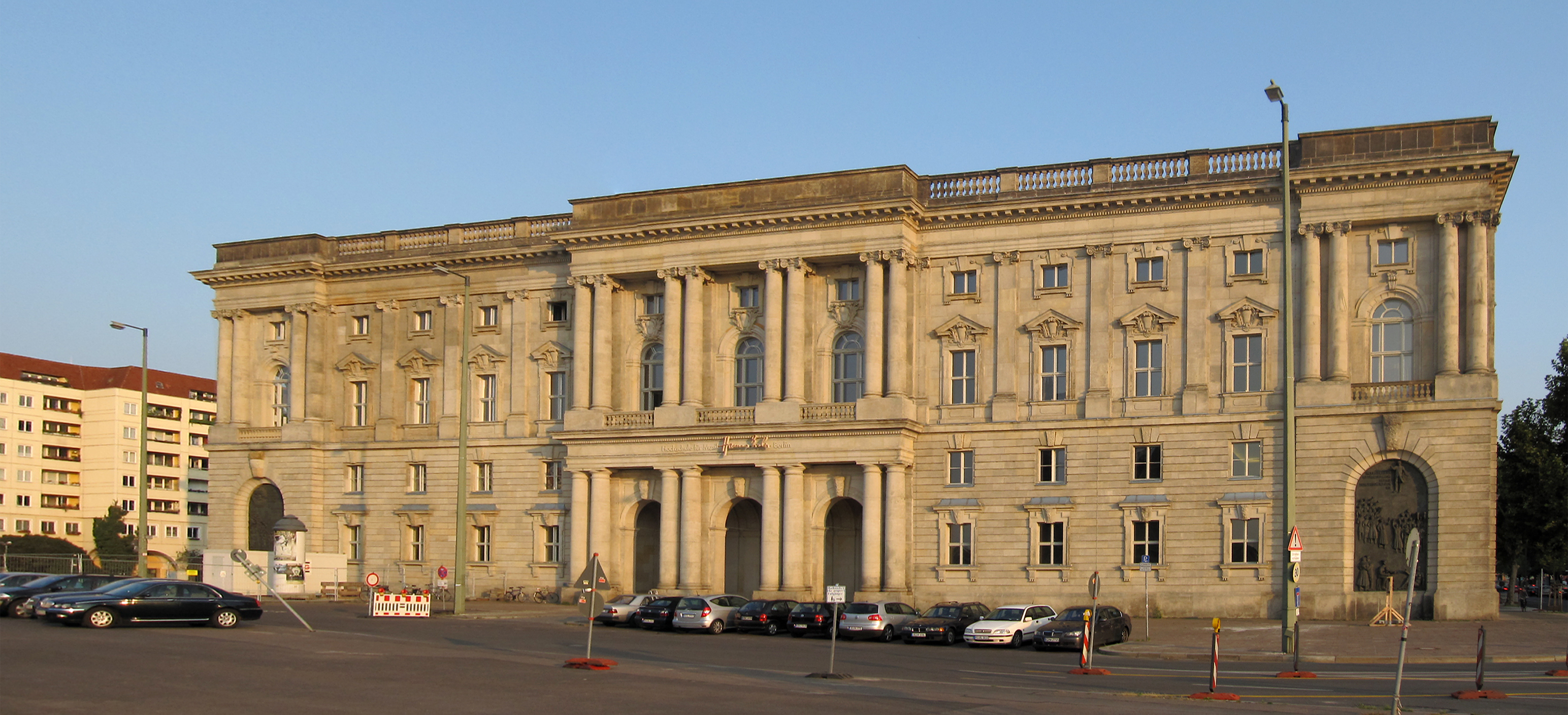
Front facade of the Neuer Marstall in 2009

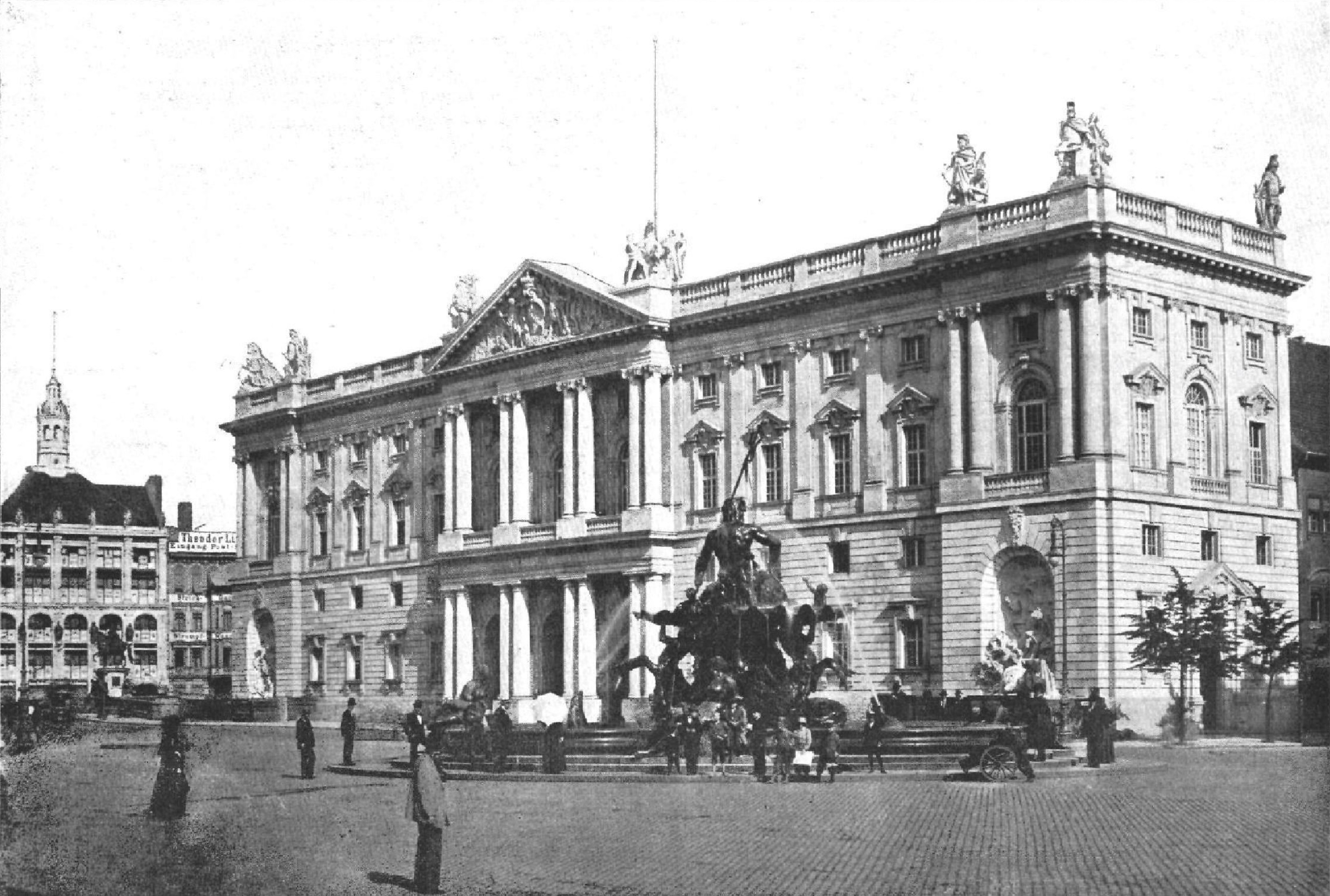
Front facade of the Neuer Marstall in 1901

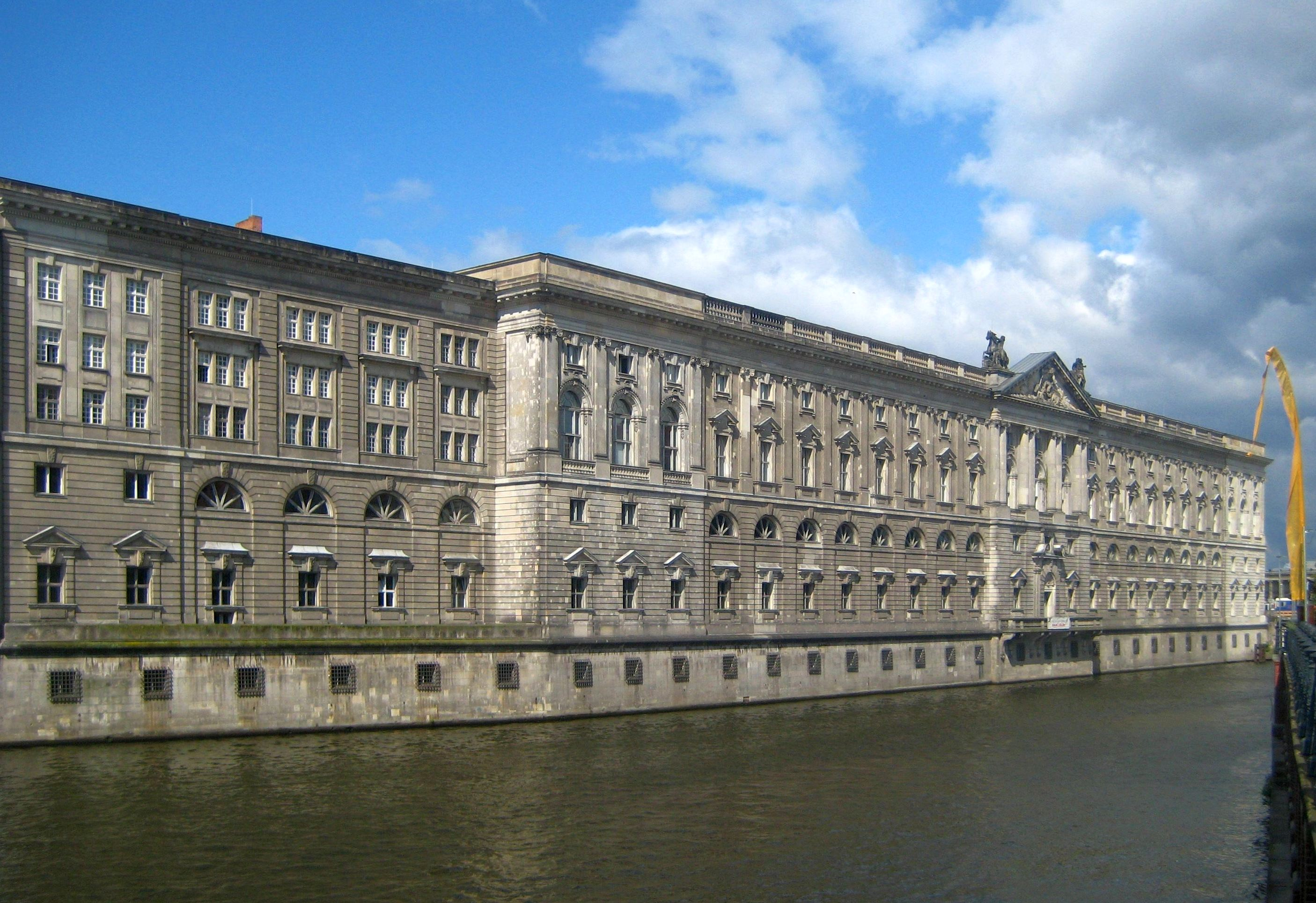
Spree River side of the Neuer Marstall in 2009

The Neuer Marstall (English: New Stables) is a listed historic building in Berlin, Germany located on the Schloßplatz and the Spree River. Completed in 1901 and facing the former Royal Palace, the neo-Baroque "New Stables" once sheltered the Royal equerry, horses and carriages of Imperial Germany. The complex also included three enclosed courtyards, a riding school, and the Knights College.

Severely damaged in World War II, the building was partially repaired in the 1960s and used as an exhibition space for the Berlin Academy of Arts. After more renovations in 2005, the building became the home of the Hanns Eisler Academy of Music and the Berlin City Library. More restoration work has continued since 2007. Lonely Planet lists the Neuer Marstall at number 79 in their 815 "things to do" in Berlin.

== History ==
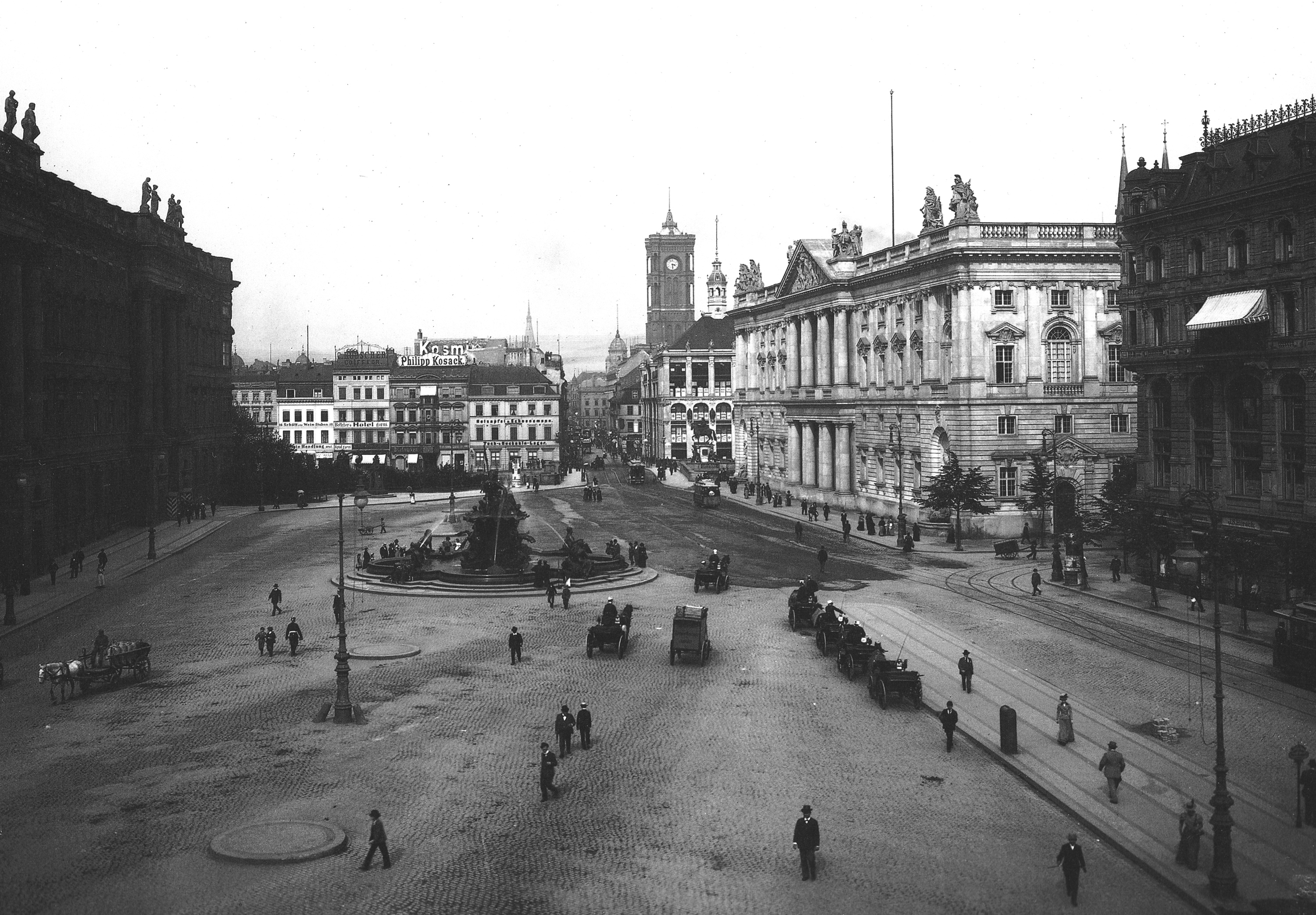
Schloßplatz in 1900; on the center right is the Neuer Marstall. The Rotes Rathaus is in the background.

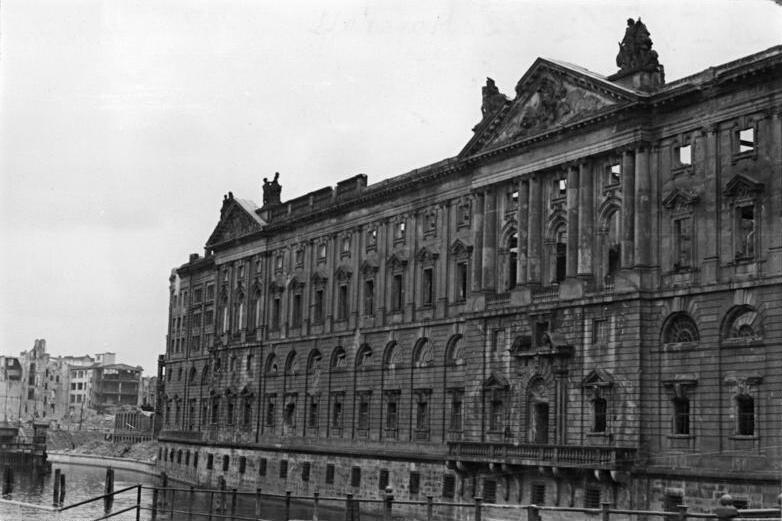
Beschädigungen 1951; Ruins of the Neuer Marstall in 1951

The Old Royal Stables (German: Alter Marstall) of the Prussian Kings were constructed in 1670 to a design by Johann Gregor Memhardt. As the role of equerry grew and the stables reached 300 horses, as well as state carriages and sleighs, the buildings became inadequate. These were incorporated into the expanded New Stables (German: Neuer Marstall) built between 1897 and 1901 according to Neo-Baroque designs by Wilhelmine architect Ernst von Ihne. The four-storey building was given a sandstone façade: the lower two floors on a rusticated base and the upper two floors in a colossal ionic order. The main façade facing the Berlin City Palace was divided by a central projection with pairs of columns and a crowning pediment. Rich sculptural decoration and the gable reliefs were by Otto Lessing (sculptor), including the "Horse Tamers" group on the Spree pediment.

During the November Revolution of 1918 the People's Navy Division (German: Volksmarinedivision) was stationed in the building during the 1918 Christmas crisis, which involved fighting that cost 67 lives. On the establishment of the Weimar Republic, the Neuer Marstall became the Berlin City Library and the old horse stables in the Spree wing were converted into a book depository.

After World War II the complex was mainly a ruin. It was partly repaired by the East Berlin government from 1950–54 and then further restored in 1961–65. The triangular gable and sculptural details on the Palace facade were replaced with an attic, resulting in a simplified appearance. The elaborate gable on the Spree side with the Horse Tamers sculpture group remained. During this period the building served as an exhibition space for the Akademie der Künste der DDR. In 1988, two bronze reliefs were installed in the large corner niches on the Palace Square facade on the 70th anniversary of the November Revolution.

== Current use ==
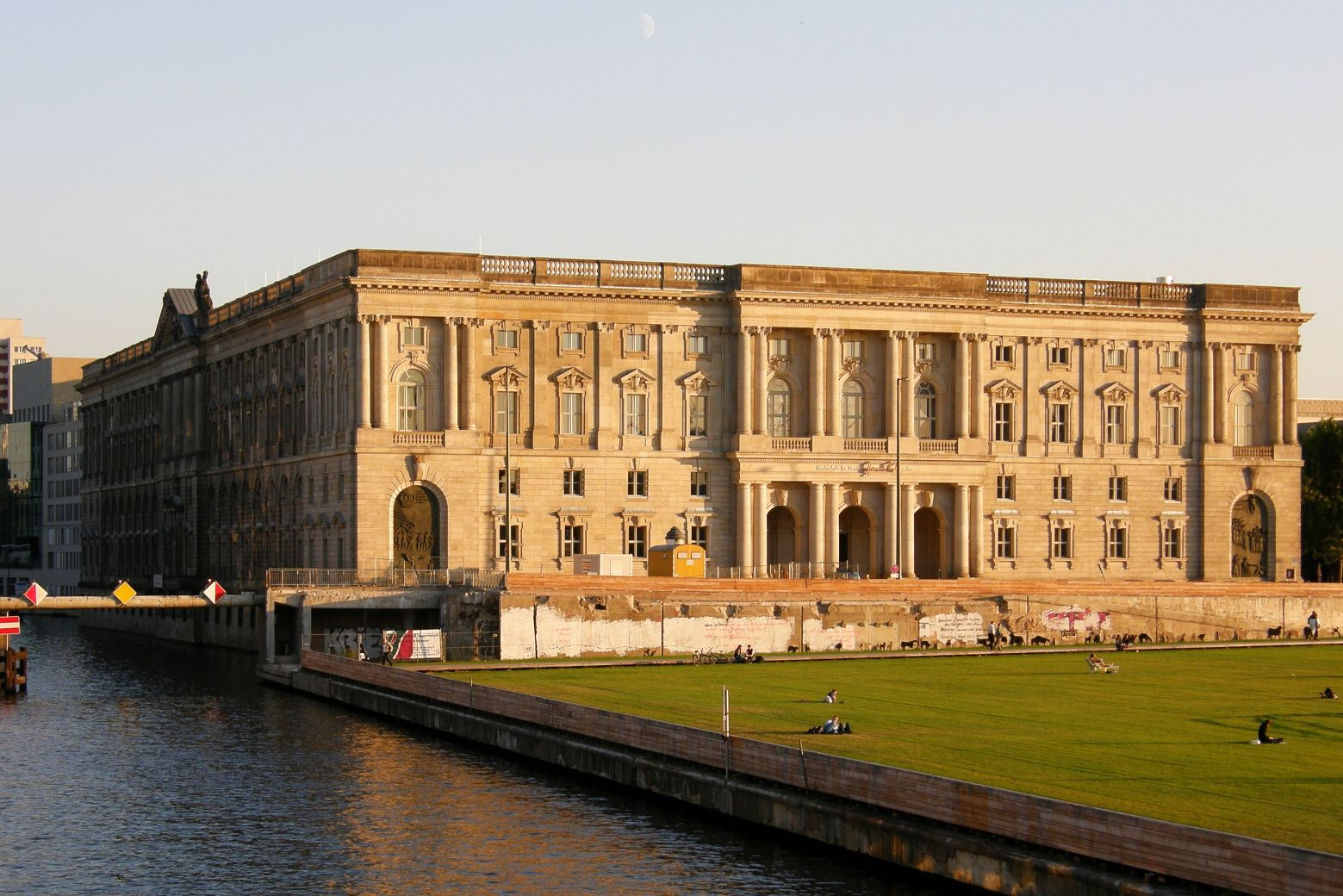
Palace Side of the Neuer Marstall in 2009, showing the restored facade

After German reunification in 1990 and renovations in 2005, the building became home to the Hanns Eisler Academy of Music, one of Europe's most prestigious conservatories. More renovation work saw a cleaned and restored facade facing Palace Square (German: Schloßplatz). The Berlin Senate Department for Urban Development estimates that the Neuer Marstall will again achieve reasonable architectural appearance in relation to Palace Square after completion of more restoration and the reconstruction of the Berlin Palace.

== Gallery ==
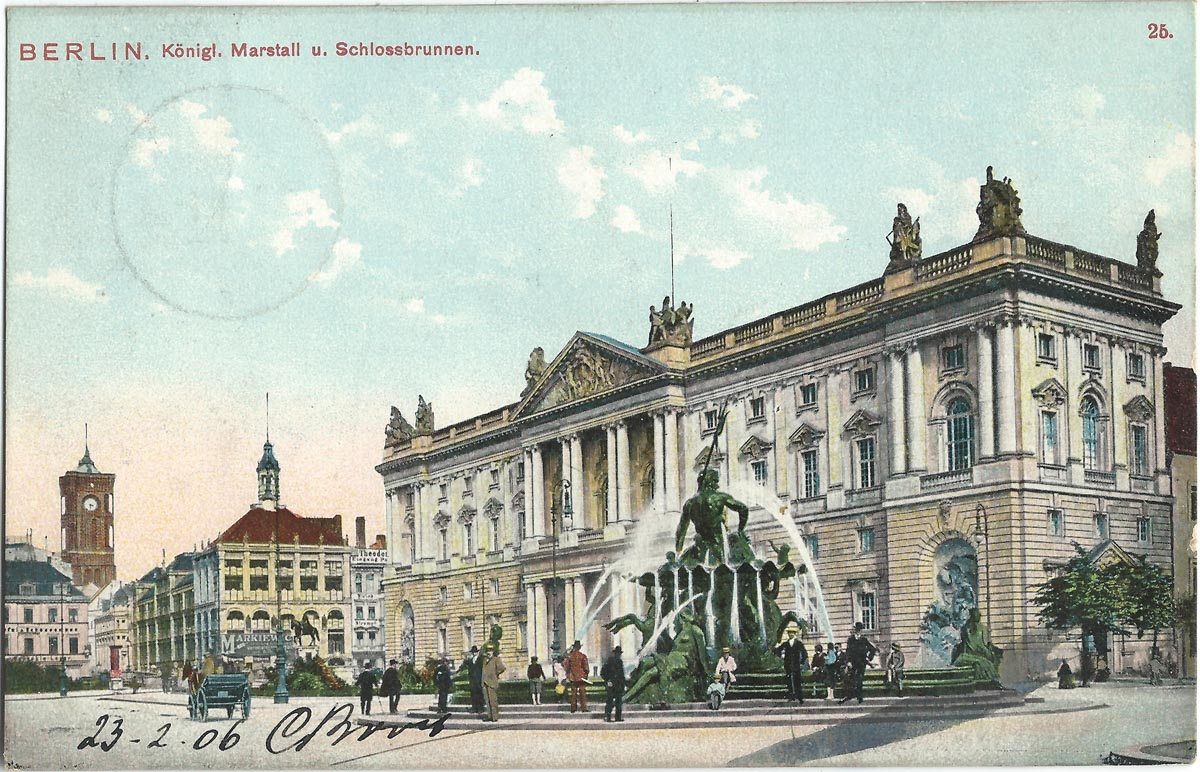
Neuer Marstall and Neptunbrunnen, c. 1900

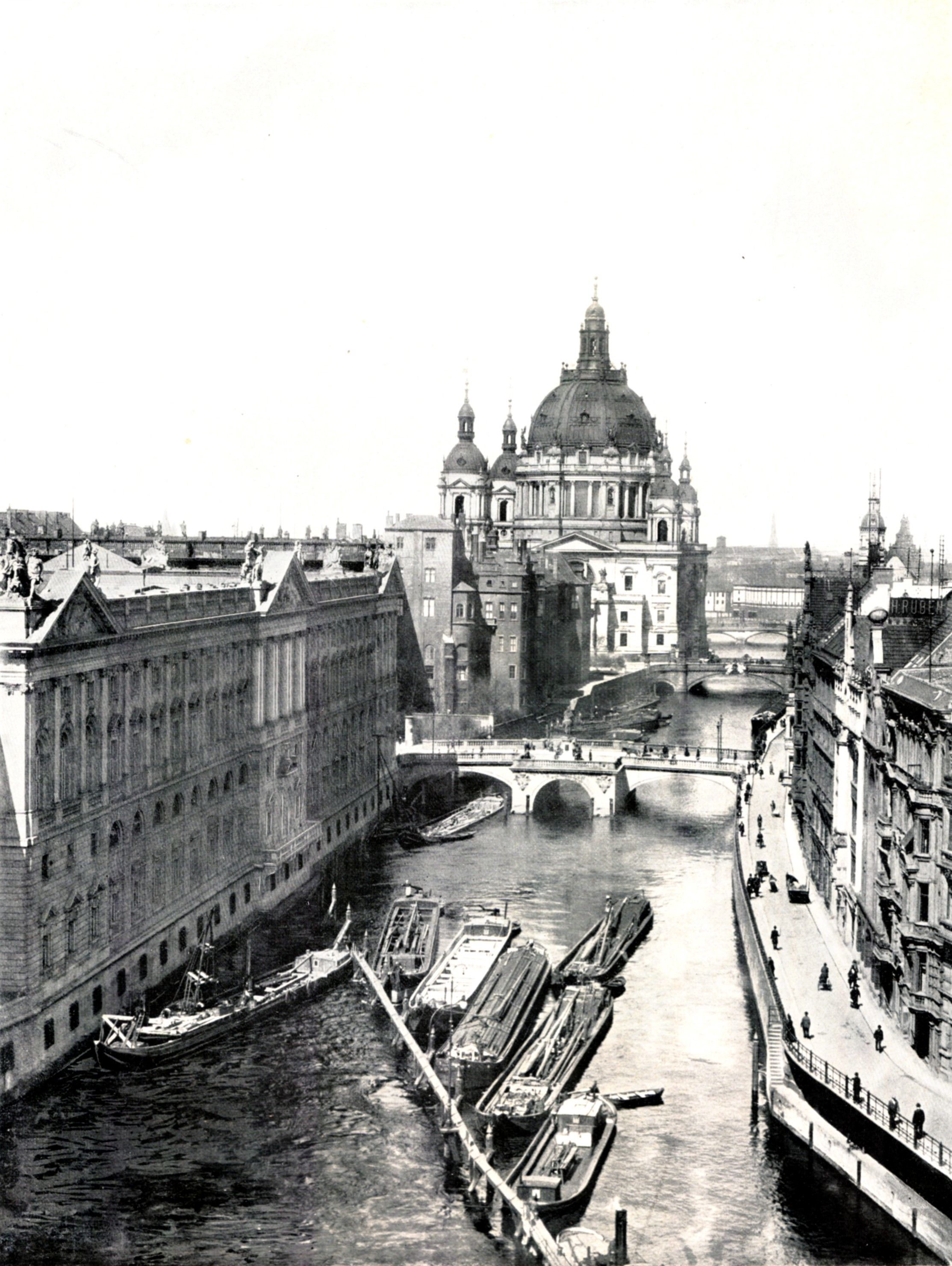
Spree River side with Berlin Cathedral, c. 1900

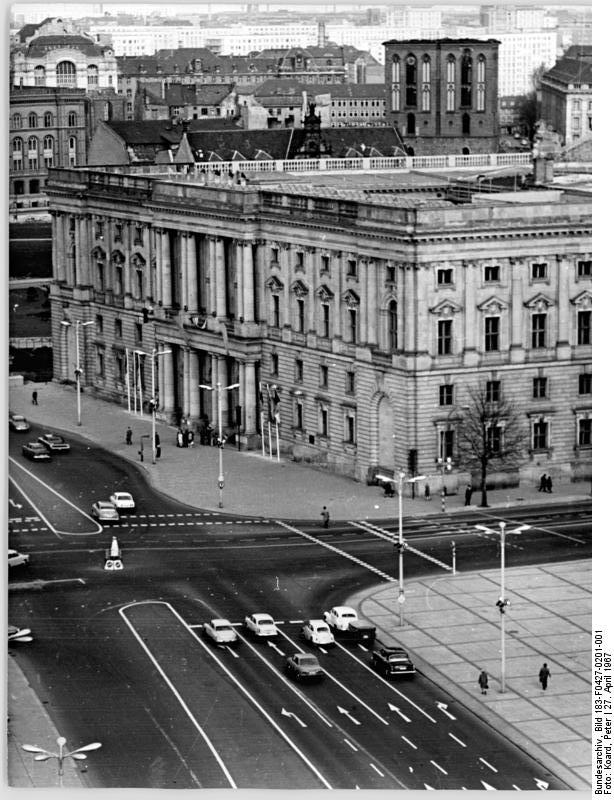
1967

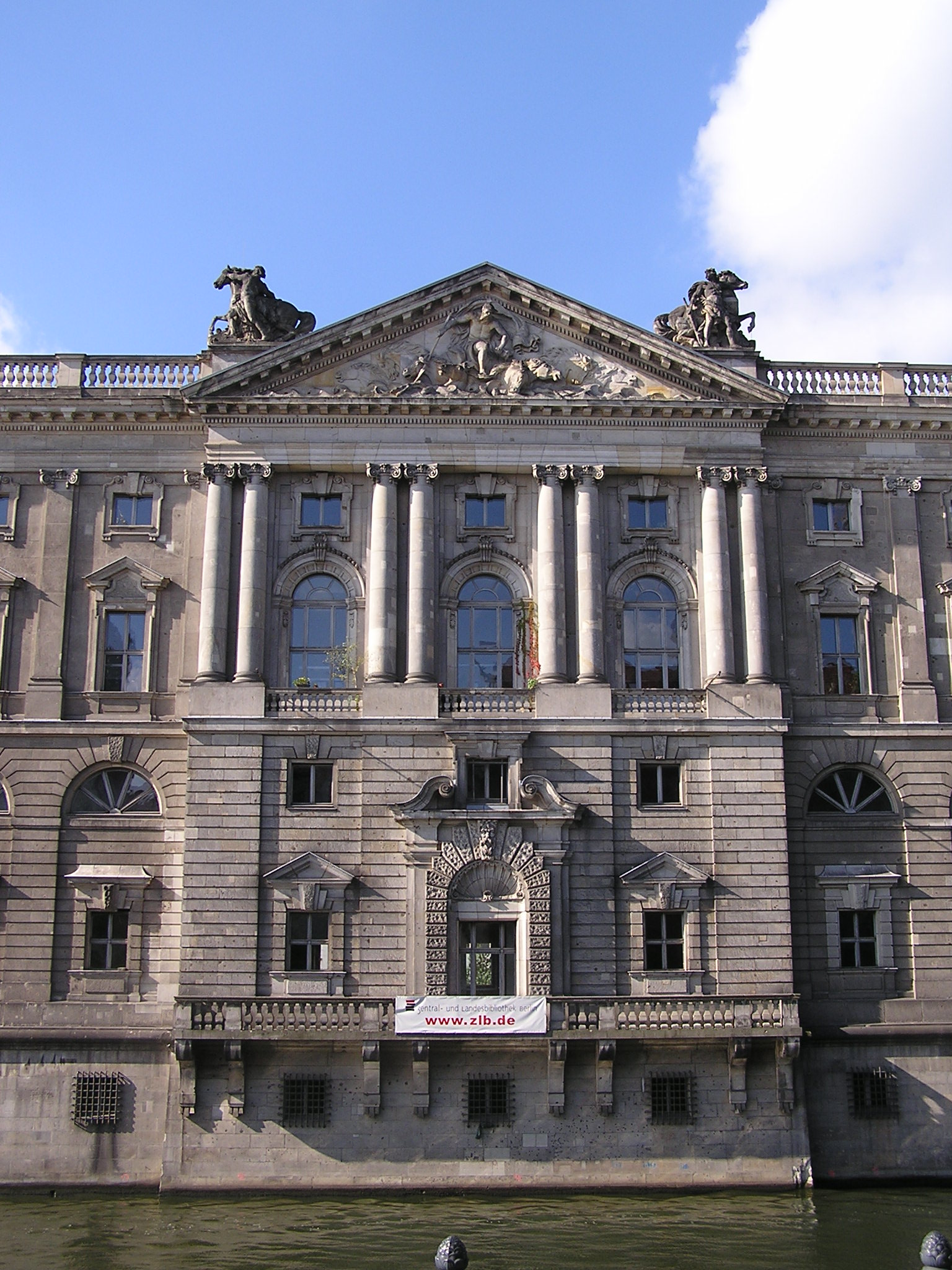
Detail of the Spree facade

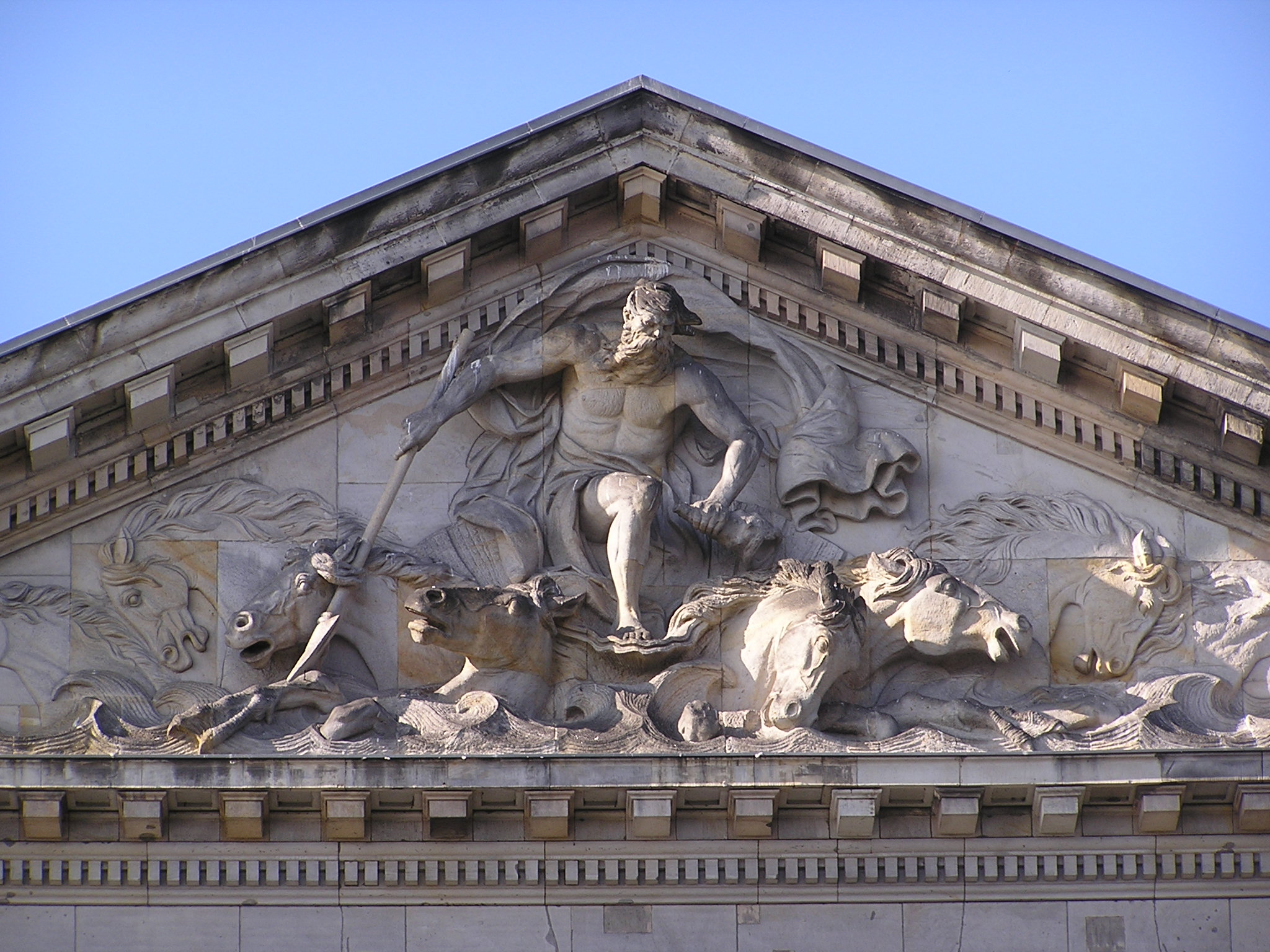
Gable detail by Otto Lessing: Poseidon taming the horses.
