= Rathaus Bridge =

Bridge in Berlin, Germany

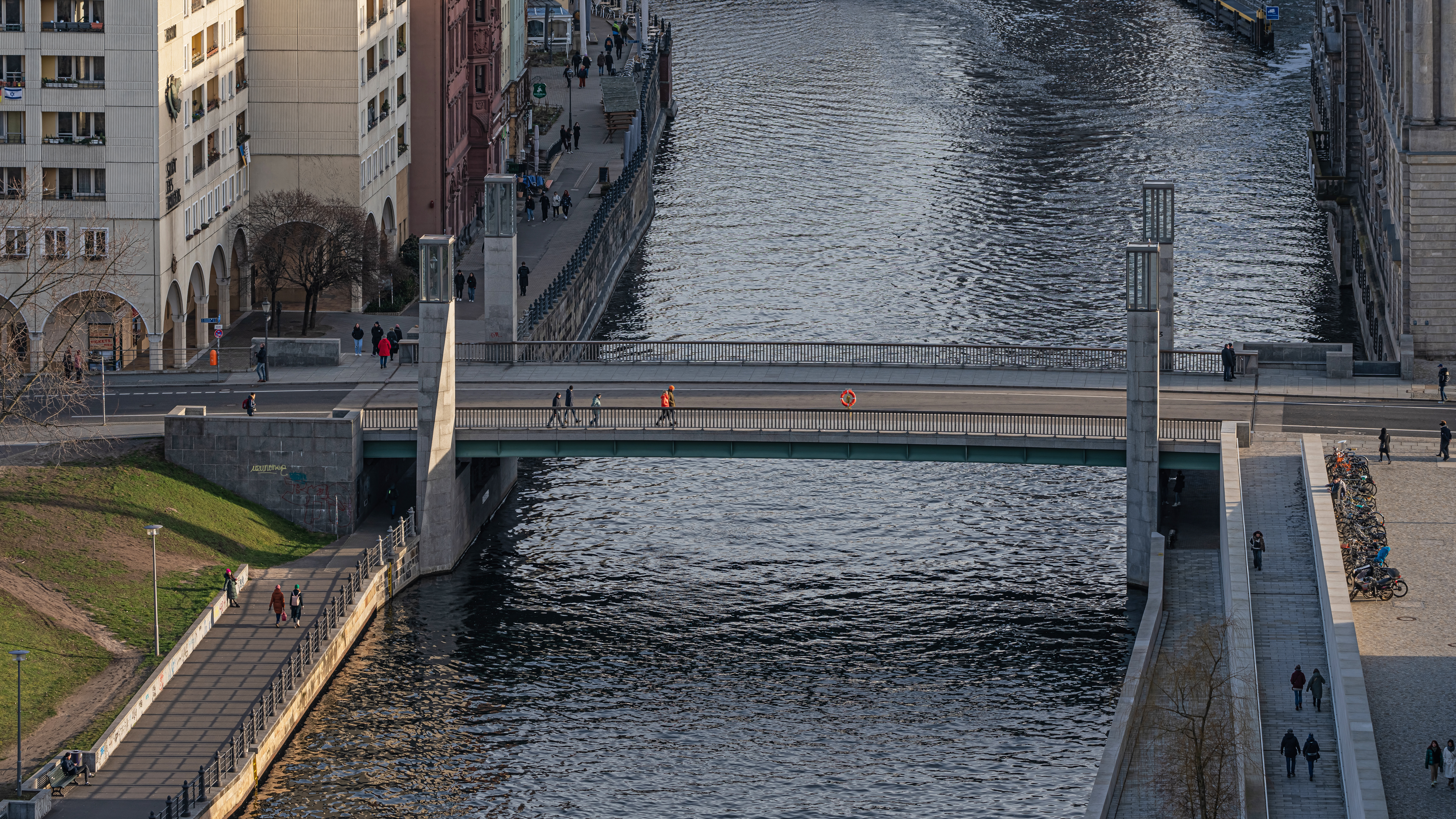
- New Rathaus Bridge in 2023
- Coordinates: 52.5171°N 13.4040°E

Location
- Interactive map of Rathaus Bridge

Rathaus Bridge (German: Rathausbrücke, "Town Hall Bridge") is a bridge in the central Mitte district of Berlin, Germany. Rebuilt in 2012, it is one of the oldest connections between the historic city centres of Alt-Berlin and Cölln across the Spree river. It is named after the nearby Rotes Rathaus city hall.

== History ==
A first wooden bridge to Spree Island at the site is documented in the 13th century, then the second river crossing parallel to the Mühlendamm causeway in the south. Called Lange Brücke due to its length, it was the site where the double city's burghers erected their common town hall. When the Brandenburg elector Frederick II Irontooth chose Berlin-Cölln as his residence, he had the City Palace erected on the island from 1443 onwards, suspiciously eyed by the citizens. When a new bridge was erected from 1661, the Hohenzollern electors funded part of the costs.

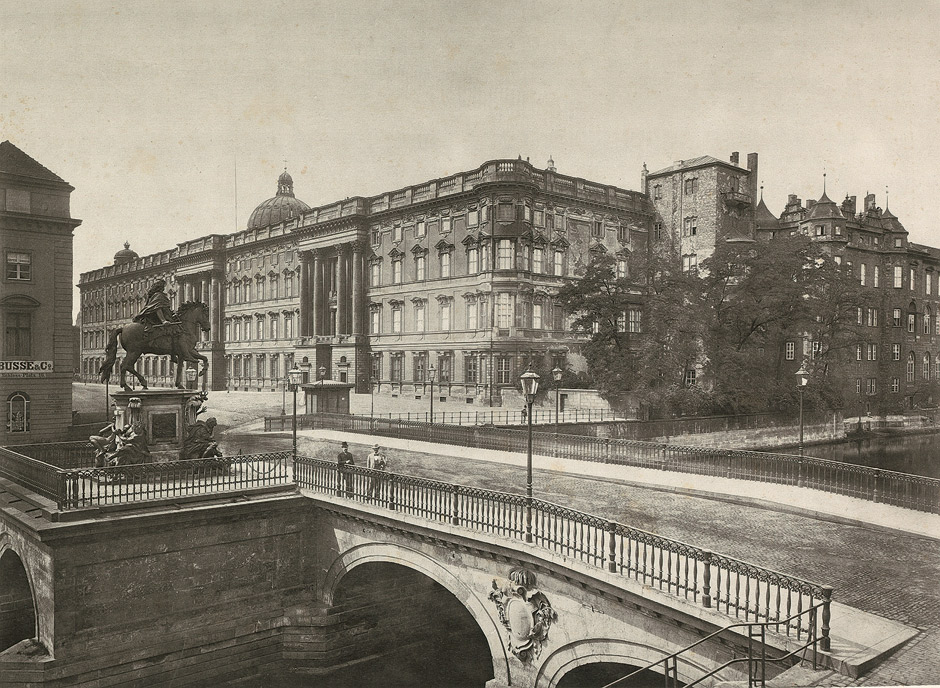
Lange Brücke with the Equestrian statue of Friedrich Wilhelm I and Berlin Palace in 1874

Under the rule of Elector Frederick III, in 1691, plans for a new construction were designed by Johann Arnold Nering in a Baroque style, consistent with the adjacent Palace. Works began the next year and were completed in 1694. Five vaulted arches, richly decorated, spanned the Spree waters; bearing the equestrian statue of "Great Elector" Frederick William of Brandenburg by Andreas Schlüter, which was ceremonially unveiled in 1703. Refurbished under the auspices of Carl Friedrich Schinkel in 1817–19, the bridge remained in use for about 200 years.

Finally by the end of the 19th century, the construction had become too small for both the traffic on the bridge and the cargo barges passing under it. A new bridge structure with three vaults was erected in 1895 and renamed Kurfürstenbrücke ("Electors' Bridge") the following year. The bridge was severely damaged by retiring Wehrmacht forces during the final Battle of Berlin in 1945. The equestrian statue had already been evacuated in 1943; it was later rediscovered in Lake Tegel and installed at its present site in front of Charlottenburg Palace.

After the war, a provisional reconstruction was carried out according to plans by Richard Ermisch; nevertheless, the damaged remnants had to be removed in 1952. The East Berlin authorities had a reinforced concrete structure erected, which was again refurbished when the Palace of the Republic was built at the site of the former City Palace in 1973–76.

The present-day bridge is a modern composite construction erected at the behest of the Berlin Senate from 2009 onwards. After several overruns in terms of both construction costs and periods, it was inaugurated on 27 September 2012.

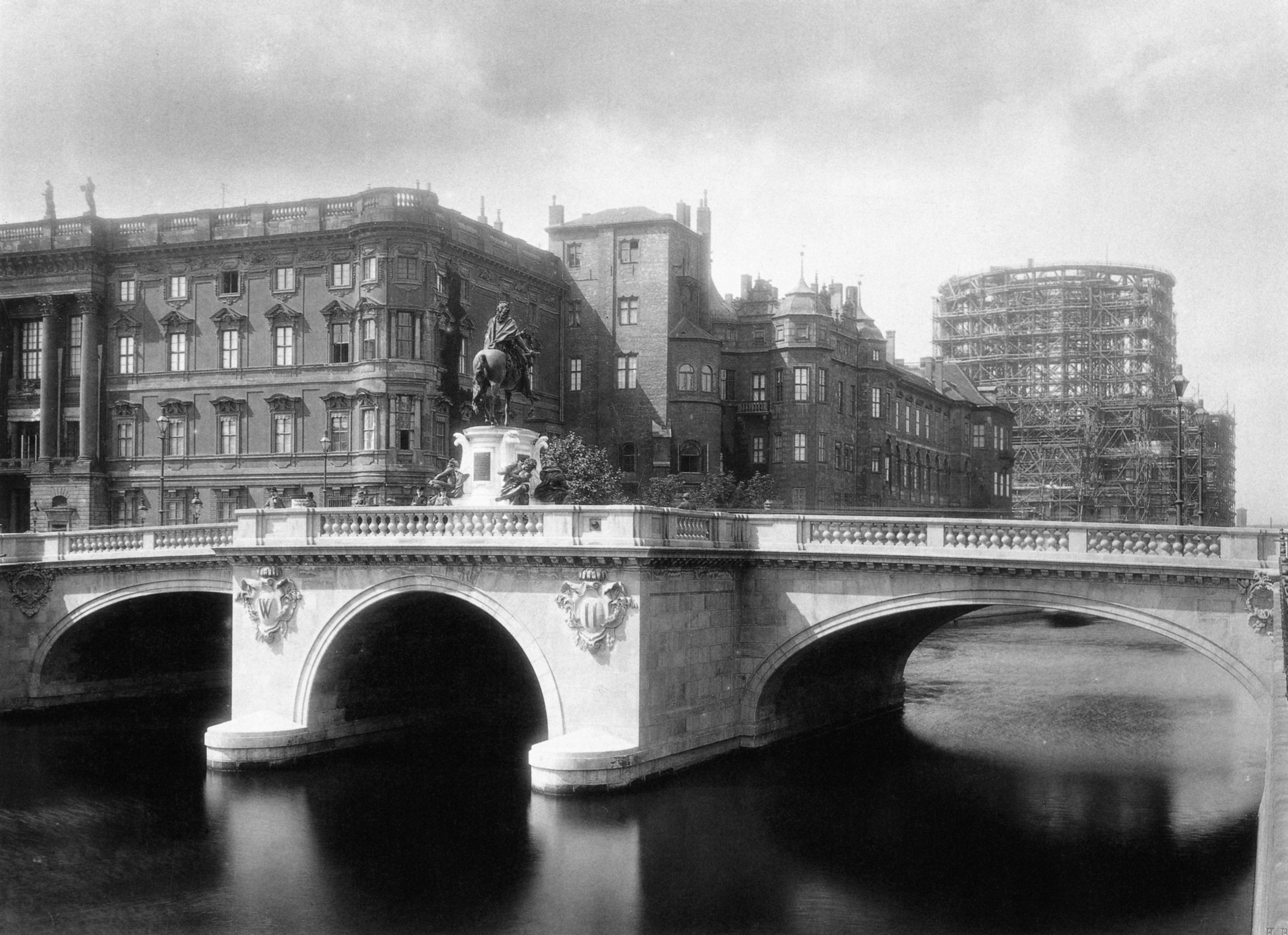
Kurfürstenbrücke and Berlin Palace in 1896

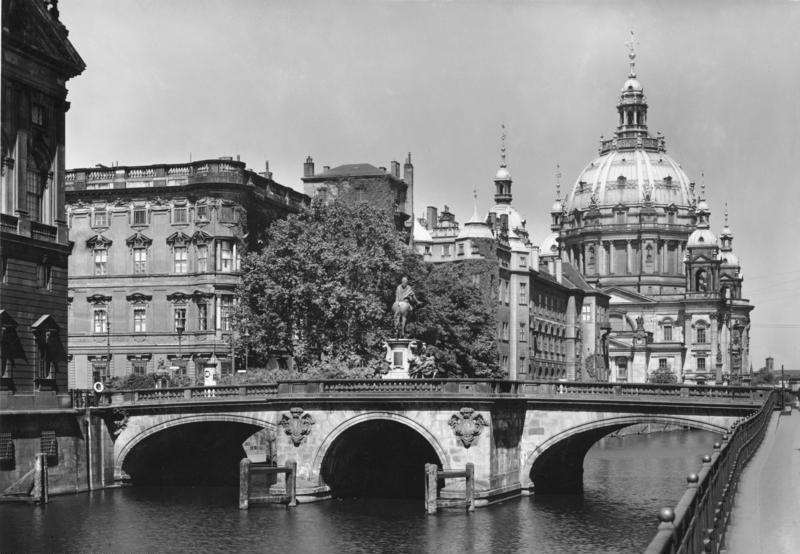
Kurfürstenbrücke with Berlin Palace and Berlin Cathedral in 1936

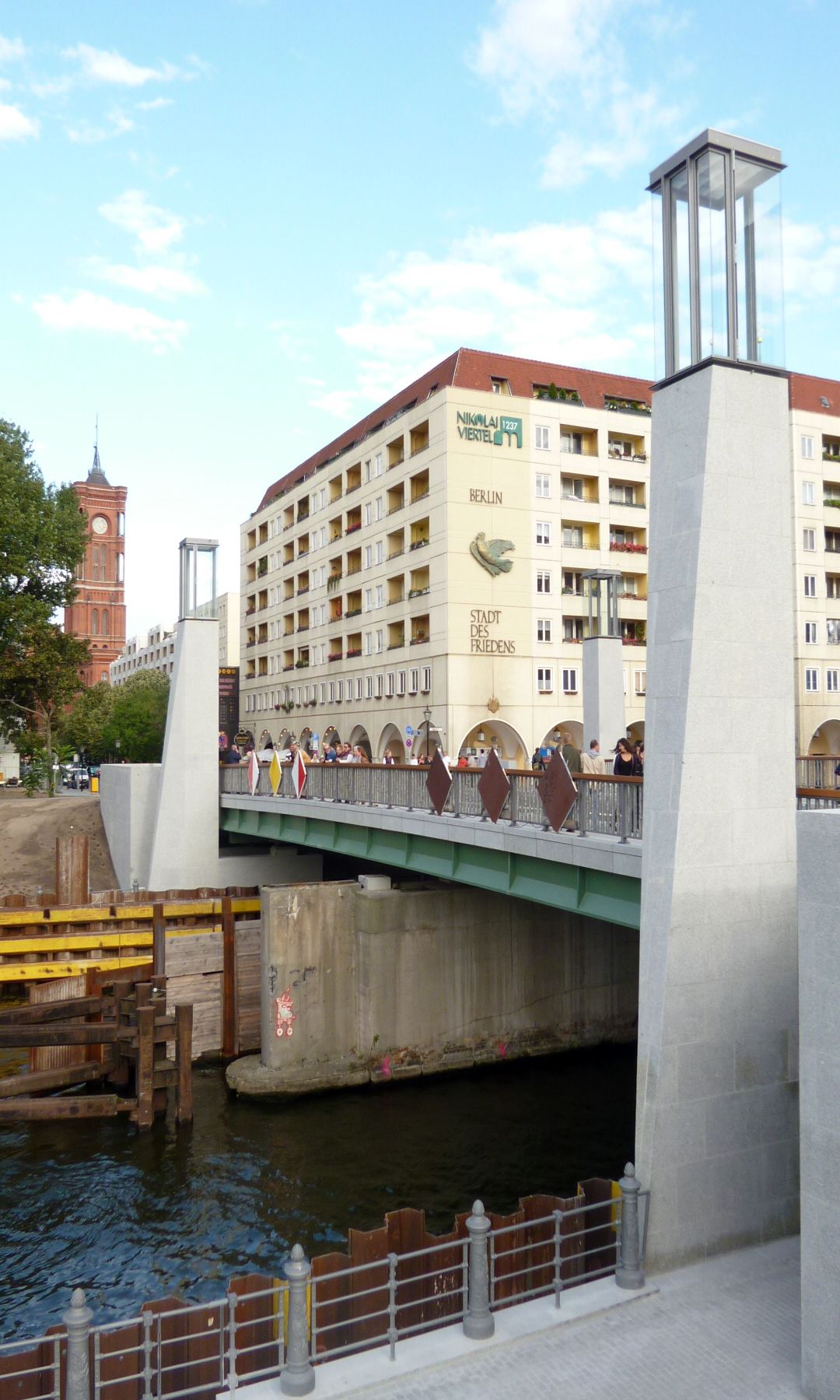
New Rathaus Bridge in 2012
