= Andreas Schlüter =

German sculptor and architect (1659–1714)

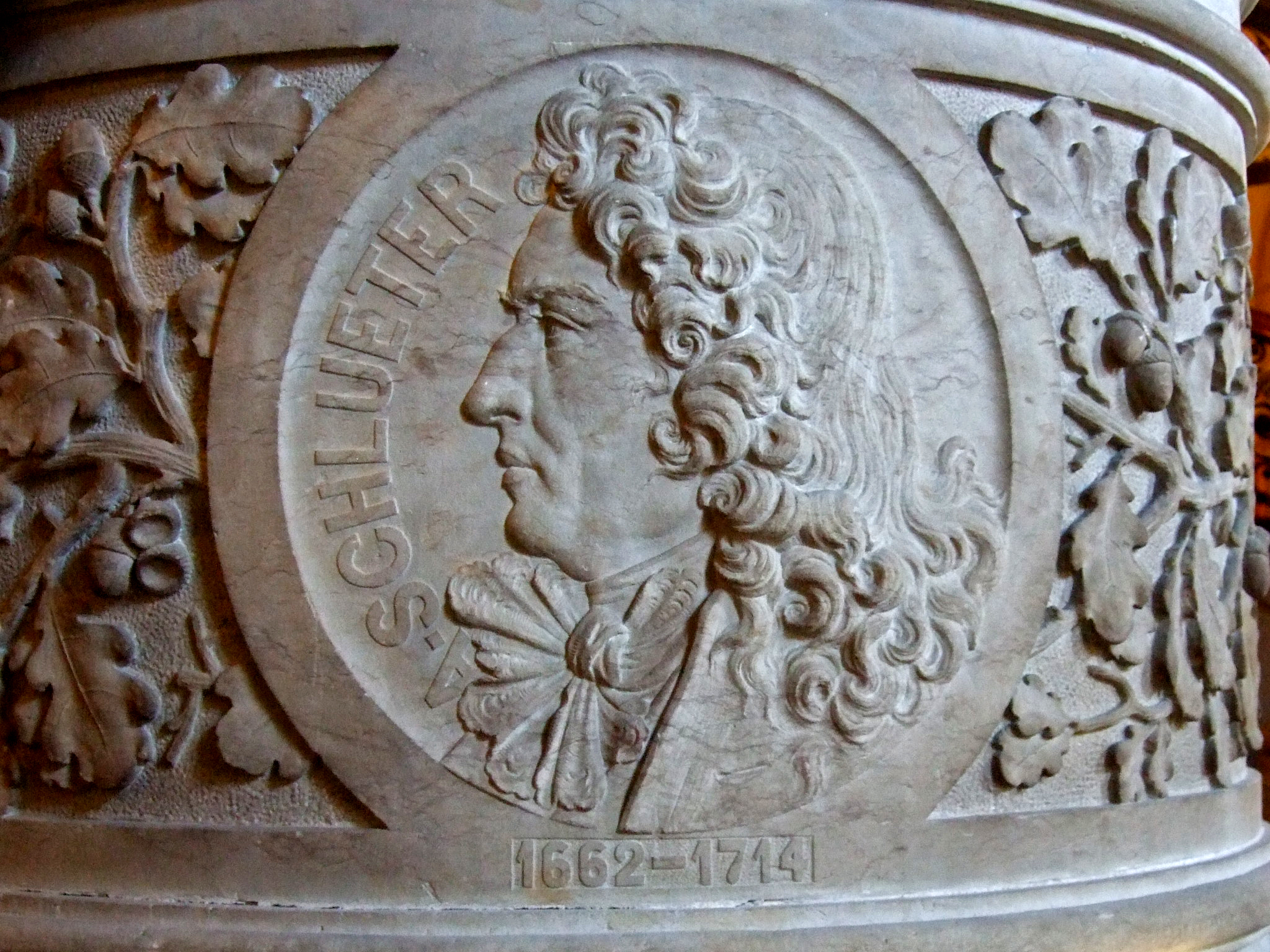
Portrait in Hamburg town hall

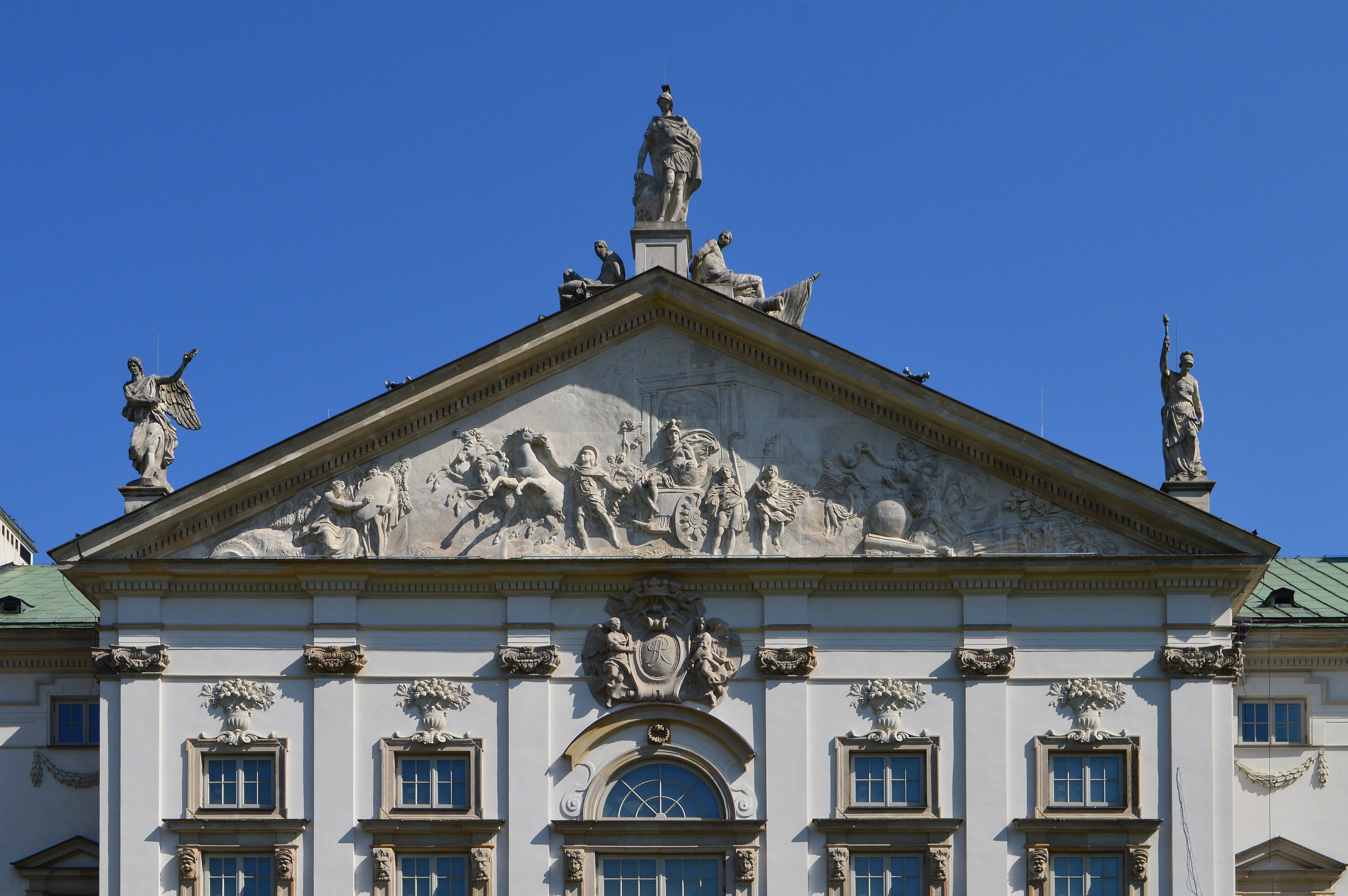
Triumph of Marcus Valerius Messalla Corvinus from Krasiński Palace in Warsaw

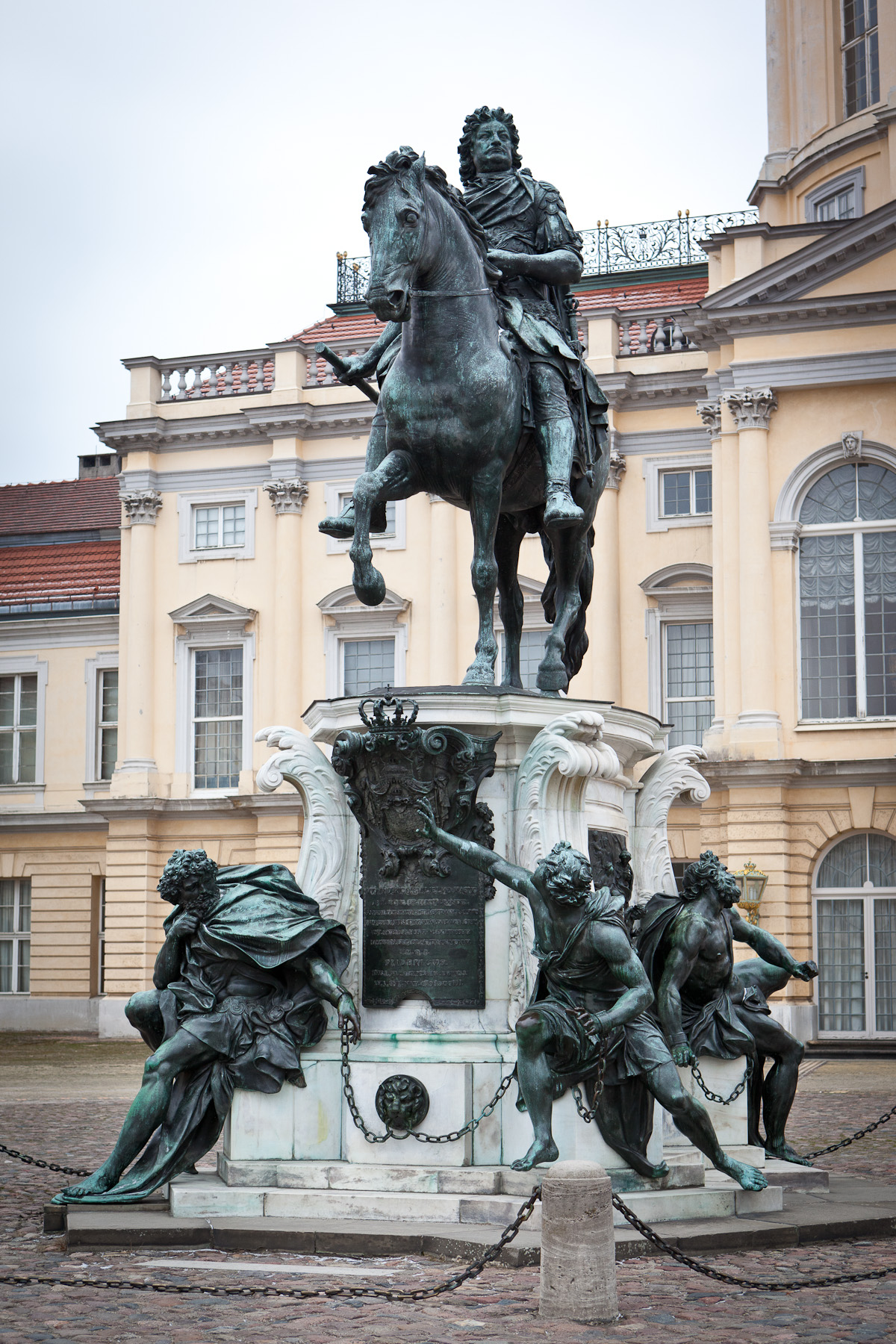
Equestrian statue of Great Elector in Berlin

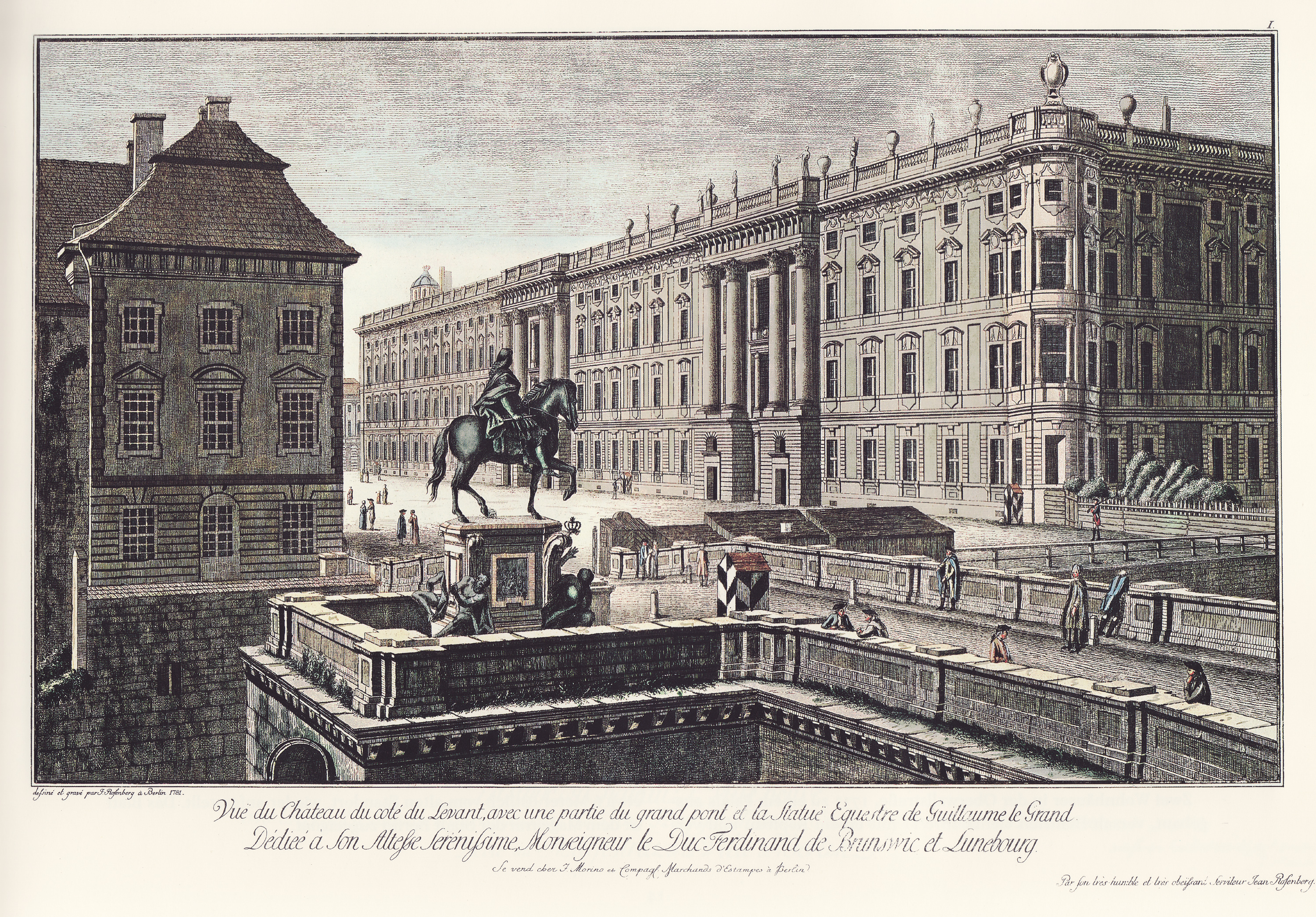
The Berlin City Palace after its redesign according to Schlüter's plans, with the equestrian statue of Great Elector

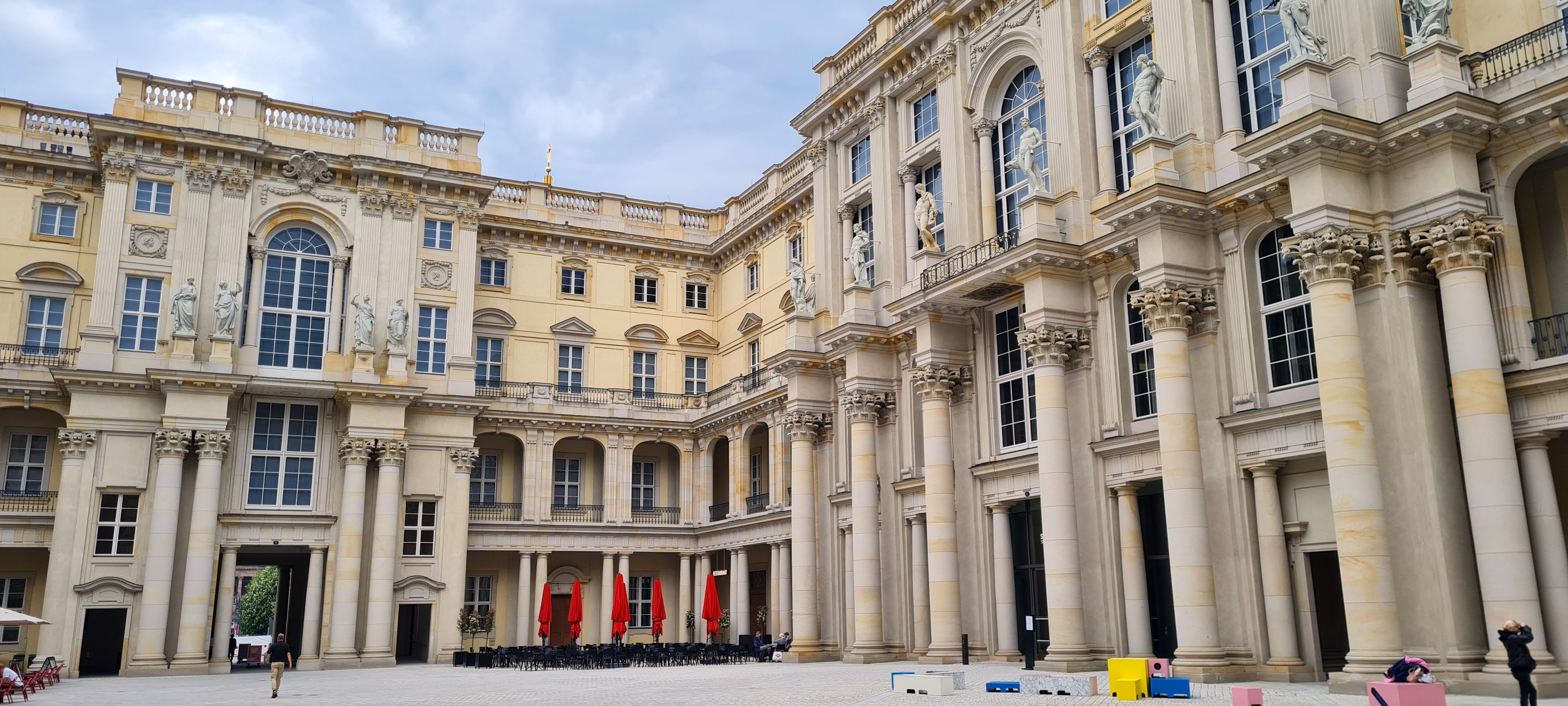
Schlüterhof, an interior courtyard of the Berlin City Palace

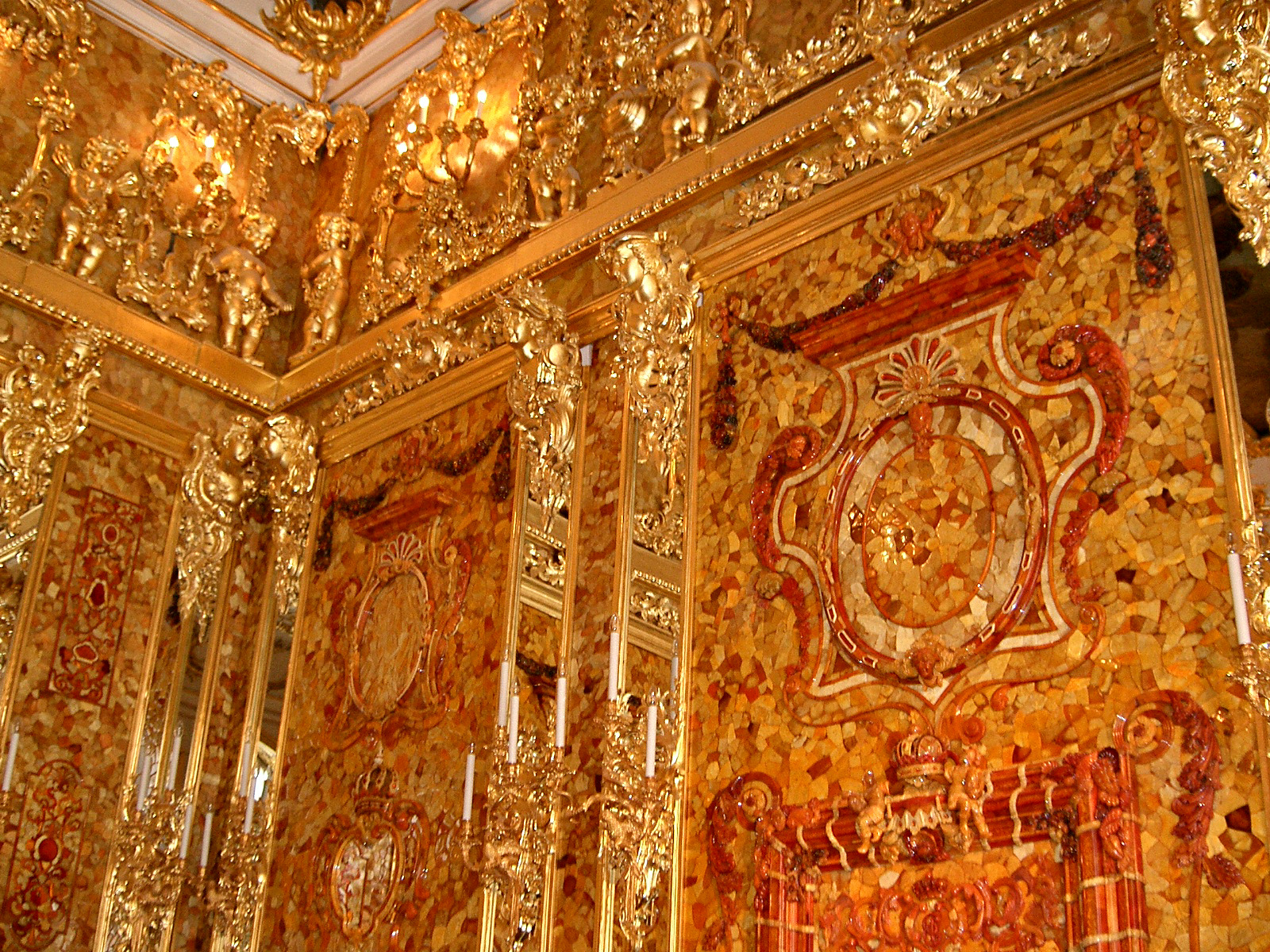
Amber Room

Andreas Schlüter (1659 – c. June 1714) was a German baroque sculptor and architect, active in the Holy Roman Empire, the Polish–Lithuanian Commonwealth, and Russia.

== Biography ==
Andreas Schlüter was probably born in Hamburg, in 1659. His early life is obscure as at least three different persons of that name are documented. The records of St. Michaelis Church, Hamburg show that an Andreas Schlüter, son of sculptor Gerhart Schlüter, had been baptized there on 22 May 1664. Documents from Danzig (now Gdańsk) reported that an Andreas Schlüter (senior) had worked 1640–1652 in Danzig's Jopengasse lane (today's ulica Piwna). Possibly born in 1640, an Andres Schliter is recorded as apprentice on 9 May 1656 by the mason's guild. Other sources state 1659 as year of birth.

He probably did spend several years abroad as Journeyman. His first work, in 1675, may have been epitaphs of the Dukes Sambor and Mestwin in the dome of Pelplin monastery.

Schlüter's first known work was the decoration of the facade of the Danzig Royal Chapel, in 1681. He later created statues for King John III Sobieski's Wilanów Palace in Warsaw and sepulchral sculptures in Zhovkva. In 1689, he moved to Warsaw and made the pediment reliefs and sculptural work of Krasiński Palace.

Schlüter was invited to Berlin in 1694 by Eberhard von Danckelmann to work as court sculptor at the armory (Zeughaus) for Elector Frederick III. His sculpted decorations are a masterpiece of baroque expression and pathos. While the more visible reliefs on the outside had to praise fighting, the statues of dying warriors in the interior denounced war and gave an indication of his pacifist religious beliefs (he is said to have been a Mennonite). Travelling through Italy in 1696, he studied the work of masters like Michelangelo Buonarroti and Gian Lorenzo Bernini.

Schlüter also worked as an architect and built many state buildings in Berlin in his role as "Hofbaumeister" (Court Architect), which he lost when one tower showed signs of a weak fundament. He also served as director of the Prussian Academy of Arts from 1702 to 1704, after which he began concentrating on sculpting again, as "Hofbildhauer" (Court Sculptor). His most important equestrian sculpture is that of the "Great Elector", Frederick William of Brandenburg, cast in 1708 and placed at "Lange Brücke" near the Berlin City Palace, now situated in the honor court before Charlottenburg Palace.

The Berlin City Palace, and many of his works, were partially destroyed by bombing in World War II and by the subsequent Communist regime. A similar fate probably befell the Amber Room, made between 1701 and 1709, Schlüter's most famous work of architecture.

The Berlin City Palace was reconstructed between 2013 and 2020.

In 1713, Schlüter's fame brought him to work for Tsar Peter I of Russia in Saint Petersburg, where he died of an illness after creating several designs. Together with Johann Friedrich Braunstein, he designed the Grand Palace and Monplaisir Palace in Peterhof Palace Complex. Also the city's oldest building, Kikin Hall, and the reliefs at the Summer Palace are attributed to him. This way he became an important figure of Petrine Baroque.

== Extant works ==
- Facade of the Royal Chapel, Gdańsk, 1681
- Sculptures on the facade of Wilanów Palace, Warsaw, after 1681
- Sculptures on the pediment of Krasiński Palace, Warsaw, 1682–83, 1689–1693
- Epitaph of Adam Zygmunt Konarski, St. Mary's Cathedral of the Assumption, Frombork near Gdańsk, after 1683
- Altar and crucifix in church, Węgrów near Warsaw, 1688–1690
- Altar in Czerniaków church, Warsaw, 1690
- Portrait bishop Jan Małachowski in Wawel Cathedral, Kraków 1693
- Aepulchral sculptures of the Sobieski family, Zhovkva near Lviv, 1692–93
- Equestrian statue of Elector Frederick William, courtyard of Charlottenburg Palace, Berlin, 1689–1703, with a copy in the Berlin Bode-Museum
- Sculptures on the facade of the Zeughaus in Berlin, 1695–1706
- Berlin City Palace, 1699–1706
- Amber Room (reconstruction) in the Catherine Palace of Tsarskoye Selo near Saint Petersburg, 1701
- Pulpit, St. Mary's Church, Berlin, 1703
- Sarcophagi of Friedrich I and Sophia Charlotte, King and Queen in Prussia in the Berlin Cathedral

== Sources ==
- "Шлютер, Андреас" . Brockhaus and Efron Encyclopedic Dictionary (in Russian). 1906.
