= Schloss Charlottenburg =

Baroque palace in Berlin, Germany

Charlottenburg Palace
- Schloss Charlottenburg
- Front view of the Charlottenburg Palace

- Location within Berlin Location within Germany

General information
- Architectural style: Baroque, Rococo
- Location: Berlin, Germany
- Coordinates: 52.5209°N 13.2957°E
- Construction started: 1695
- Completed: 1713

Design and construction
- Architect: Johann Arnold Nering

Website
- SPSG

Schloss Charlottenburg (Charlottenburg Palace) is a Baroque palace in Berlin, located in Charlottenburg, a district of the Charlottenburg-Wilmersdorf borough, and is among the largest palaces in the world.

The palace was built at the end of the 17th century and was greatly expanded during the 18th century, primarily for Frederick the Great. It includes much lavish internal decoration in Baroque and Rococo styles. A large formal garden surrounded by woodland was added behind the palace, including a belvedere, a mausoleum, a theatre and a pavilion. During the Second World War, the palace was badly damaged but has since been reconstructed. The palace with its gardens is a major tourist attraction.

== History ==
=== Palace ===
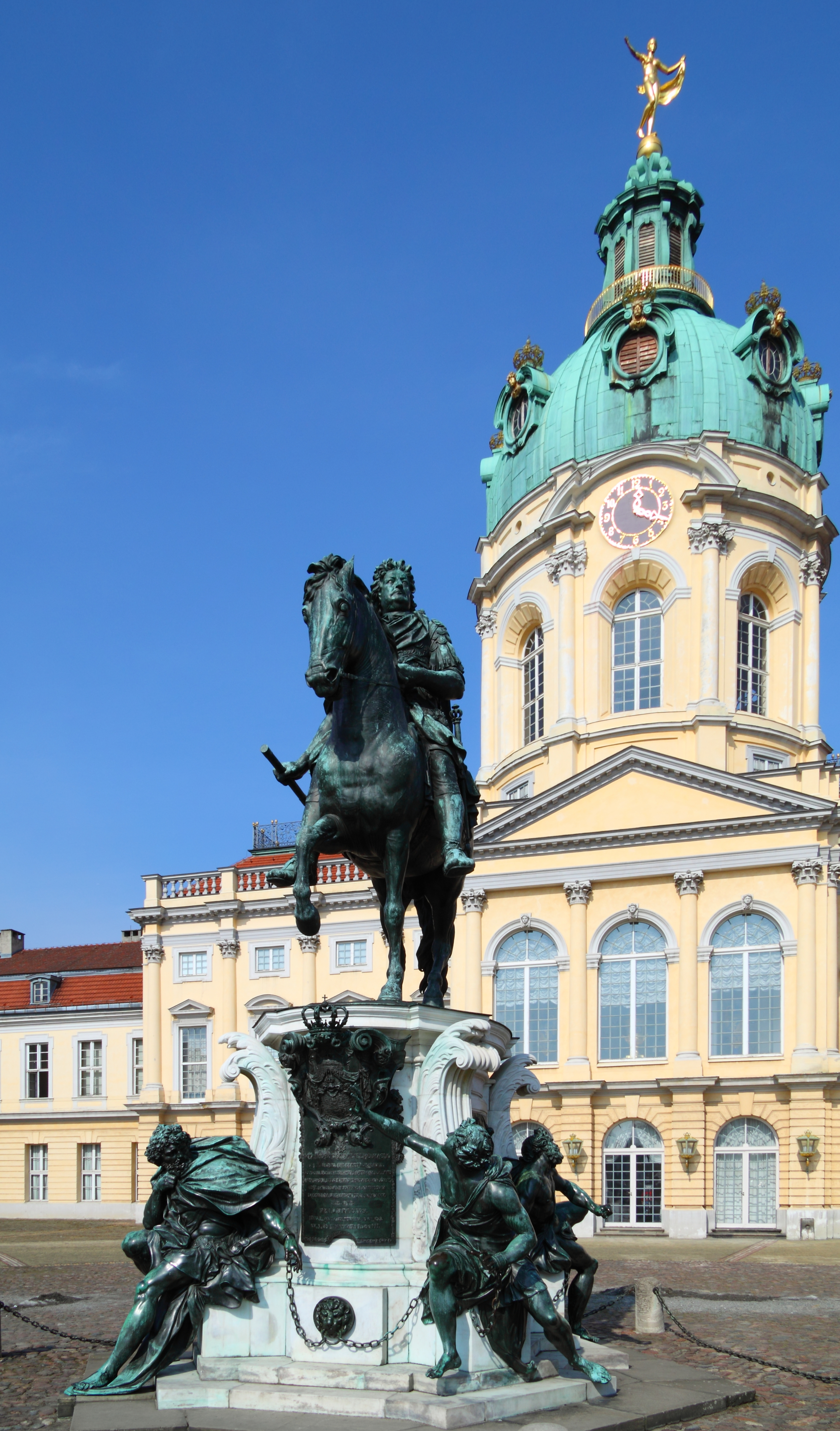
Statue of Friedrich Wilhelm (der Große Kurfürst), Elector of Brandenburg in the cour d'honneur of the palace

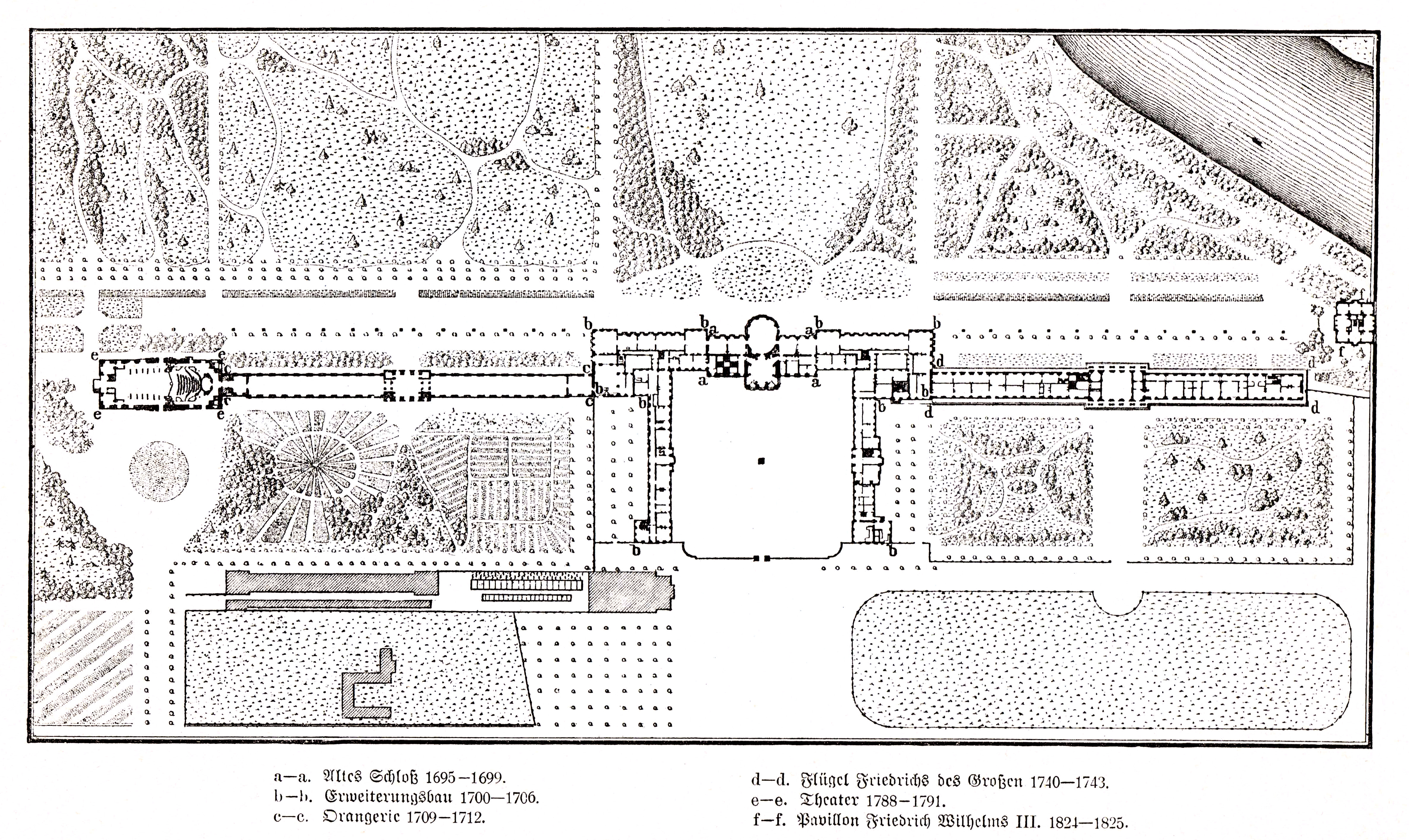
The building history of Charlottenburg Palace

The original palace was commissioned by Sophie Charlotte, the wife of Frederick III, Elector of Brandenburg in what was then the village of Lietzow. Named Lietzenburg, the palace was designed by Johann Arnold Nering in Baroque style. It consisted of one wing and was built in 2 1/2 stories with a central cupola. The façade was decorated with Corinthian pilasters. On the top was a cornice on which were statues. At the rear in the centre of the palace were two oval halls, the upper one being a ceremonial hall and the lower giving access to the gardens. Nering died during the construction of the palace and the work was completed by Martin Grünberg and Andreas Schlüter. The inauguration of the palace was celebrated on 11 July 1699, Frederick's 42nd birthday.

Frederick crowned himself as Frederick I, King in Prussia in 1701 (Frederick II, known as Frederick the Great, would later achieve the title King of Prussia). Two years previously, he had appointed Johann Friedrich von Eosander (also known as Eosander von Göthe) as the royal architect and sent him to study architectural developments in Italy and France, particularly the Palace of Versailles. On his return in 1702, Eosander began to extend the palace, starting with two side wings to enclose a large courtyard, and the main palace was extended on both sides. Sophie Charlotte died in 1705 and Frederick named the palace and its estate Charlottenburg in her memory. In the following years, the Orangery was built on the west of the palace and the central area was extended with a large domed tower and a larger vestibule. On top of the dome is a wind vane in the form of a gilded statue representing Fortuna designed by Andreas Heidt. The Orangery was originally used to overwinter rare plants. During the summer months, when over 500 orange, citrus and sour orange trees decorated the baroque garden, the Orangery regularly was the gorgeous scene of courtly festivities.

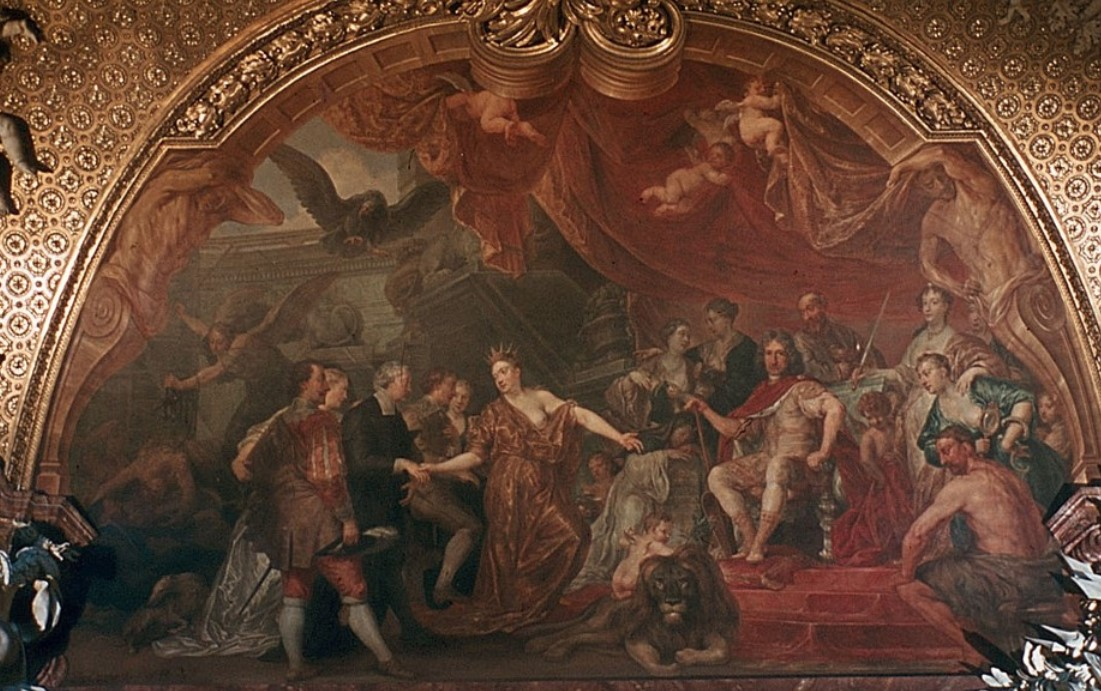
Allegory of the acts of peace of Frederick I by Jan Anthonie Coxie in the Gobelin Gallery

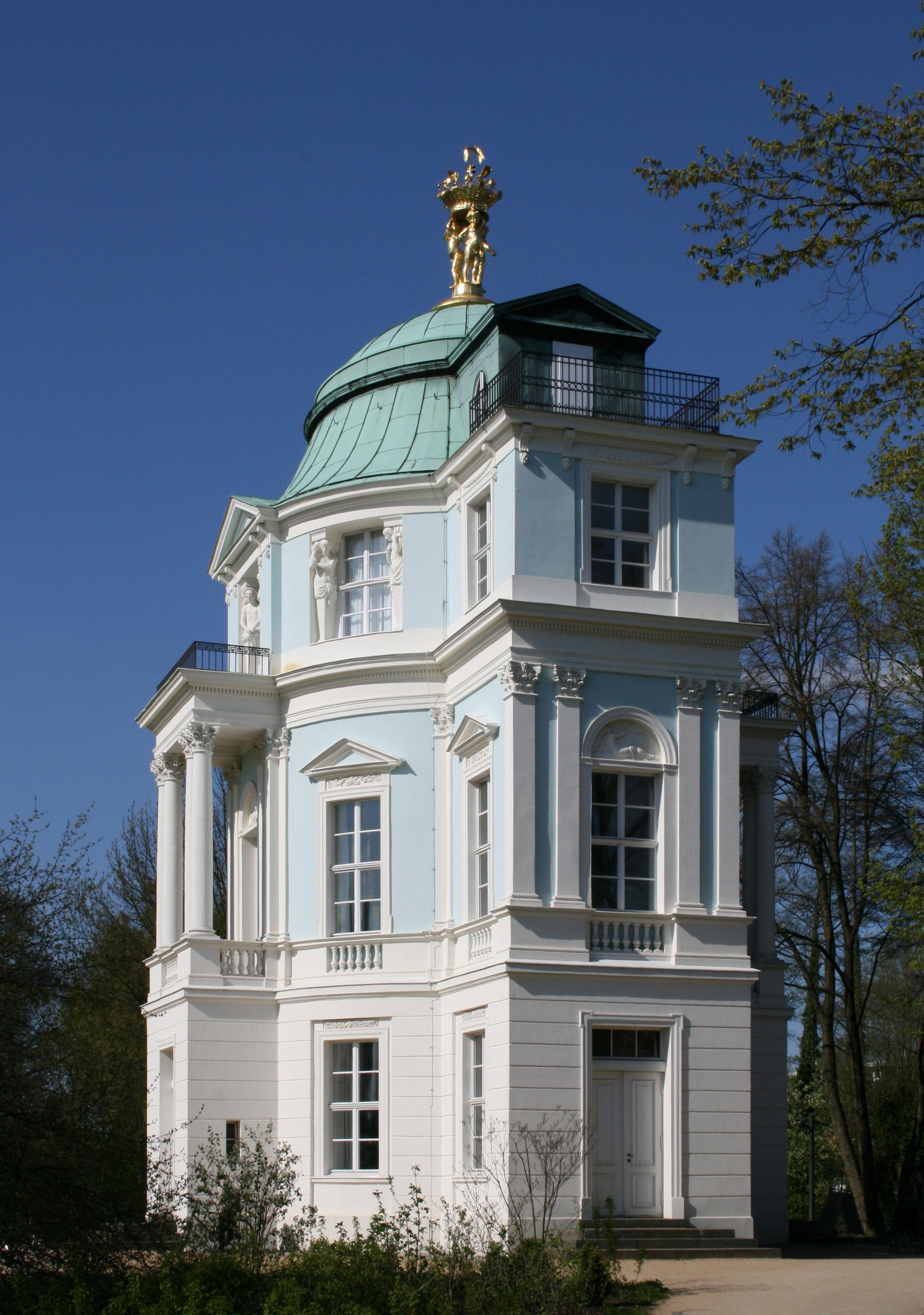
Tea house "Belvedere" in palace garden

Various artists were invited to decorate the interior of the palace. As the court painter of Frederick I, the Flemish artist Jan Anthonie Coxie was commissioned to paint the walls and ceilings in various rooms of the palace. Coxie painted between 1701 and 1713 frescos and an altarpiece in the Palace Chapel and frescos in the Gobelin Gallery and Porcelain Room. The frescos in the Porcelain Room were blatant propaganda for the rule of Frederick I. They represent Aurora, the Goddess of Dawn, in her seven-horsed chariot chasing away Night and clearing the way for the Sun-God Apollo, who approaches in his chariot in a blaze of light. Hovering overhead, Mercury heralds the arrival of the life-giving god and Saturn ushers in the Golden Age with his scythe. Coxie also included images of the Four Continents as well as the Four Seasons, which are familiar allusions to political power and thus affirm the greatness of Frederick I.

Inside the palace, was a room described as "the eighth wonder of the world", the Amber Room (Bernsteinzimmer), a room with its walls surfaced in decorative amber. It was designed by Andreas Schlüter, and its construction by the Danish amber craftsman Gottfried Wolfram started in 1701. Frederick William I gave the Amber Room to Tsar Peter the Great as a present in 1716.

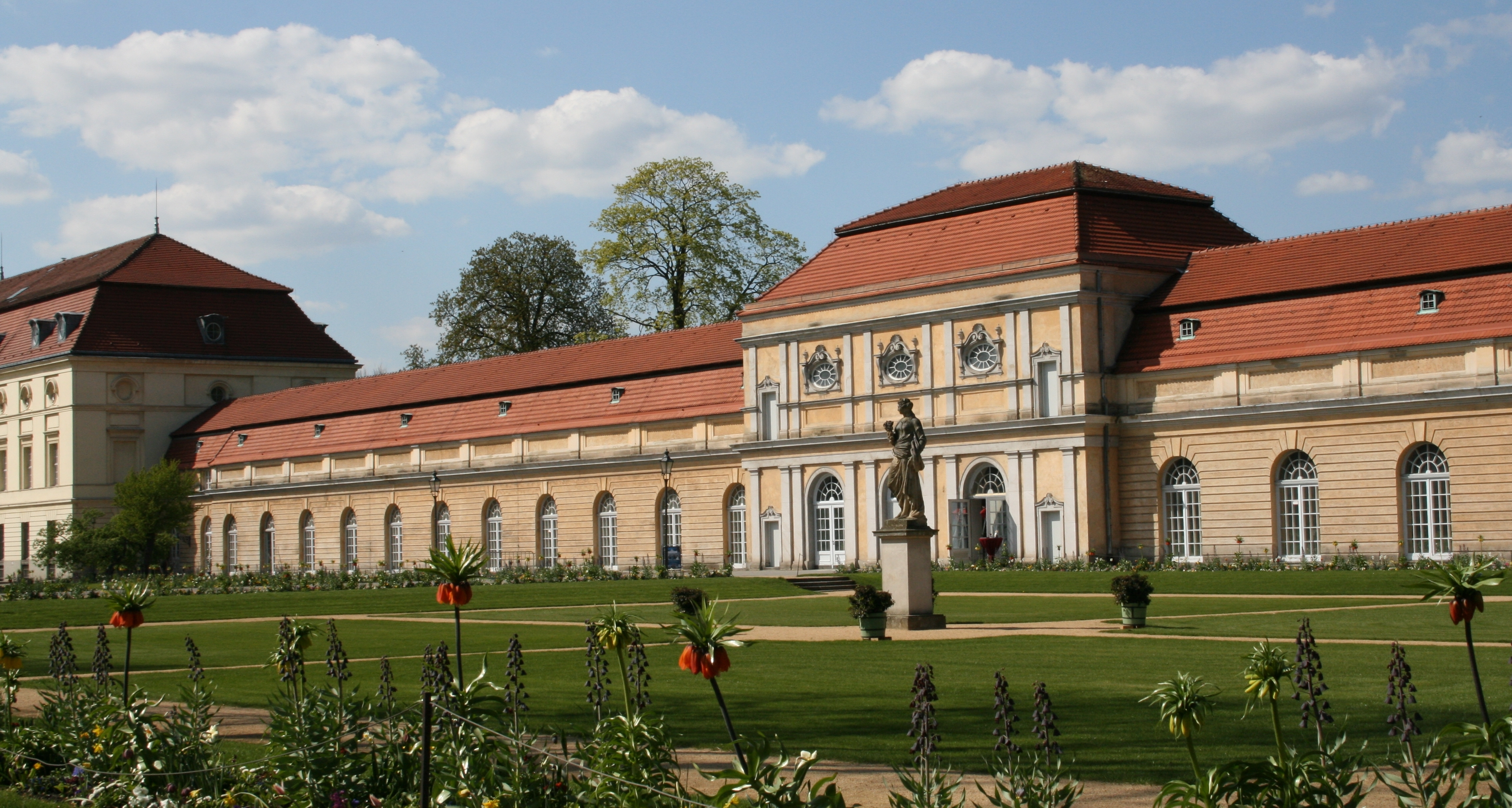
Charlottenburg Palace, Orangerie

When Frederick I died in 1713, he was succeeded by his son, Frederick William I whose building plans were less ambitious, although he did ensure that the building was properly maintained. Building was resumed after his son Frederick II (Frederick the Great) came to the throne in 1740. During that year, stables for his personal guard regiment were completed to the south of the Orangery wing and work was started on the east wing. The building of the new wing was supervised by Georg Wenzeslaus von Knobelsdorff, the superintendent of all the Royal Palaces, who largely followed Eosander's design. The decoration of the exterior was relatively simple but the interior furnishings were rich with painting and sculpture, textiles, and mirrors. The ground floor was intended for Frederick's wife Elisabeth Christine of Brunswick-Bevern, who, preferring Schönhausen Palace however, was only an occasional visitor. The especially splendid decoration of the upper floor, which included the White Hall, the Banqueting Hall, the Throne Room and the Golden Gallery, was designed mainly by Johann August Nahl. In 1747, a second apartment for the king was prepared in the distant eastern part of the wing. During this time, Sanssouci was being built at Potsdam, and once this was completed Frederick was only an occasional visitor to Charlottenburg.

In 1786, Frederick was succeeded by his nephew Frederick William II, who transformed five rooms on the ground floor of the east wing into his summer quarters and part of the upper floor into Winter Chambers, although he did not live long enough to use them. His son, Frederick William III, came to the throne in 1797 and reigned with his wife, Louise of Mecklenburg-Strelitz, for 43 years. They spent much of this time living in the east wing of Charlottenburg. In 1804, following Prussia's defeat at Jena-Auerstedt, Napoleon marched into Berlin and settled in the palace, which became his headquarters. Their eldest son, Frederick William IV, who reigned from 1840 to 1861, lived in the upper storey of the central palace building. After Frederick William IV died, the only other royal resident of the palace was Frederick III, who reigned for 99 days in 1888.

The palace was badly damaged in 1943 during the Second World War. In 1951, the war-damaged Stadtschloss in East Berlin was demolished and, as the damage to Charlottenburg was at least as serious, it was feared that it would also be demolished. However, following the efforts of Margarete Kühn, the director of the State Palaces and Gardens, it was rebuilt to its former condition, with gigantic modern ceiling paintings by Hann Trier. From 2004 until early 2006, Charlottenburg Palace was the seat of the president of Germany, whilst Schloss Bellevue was being renovated.

=== Grounds ===
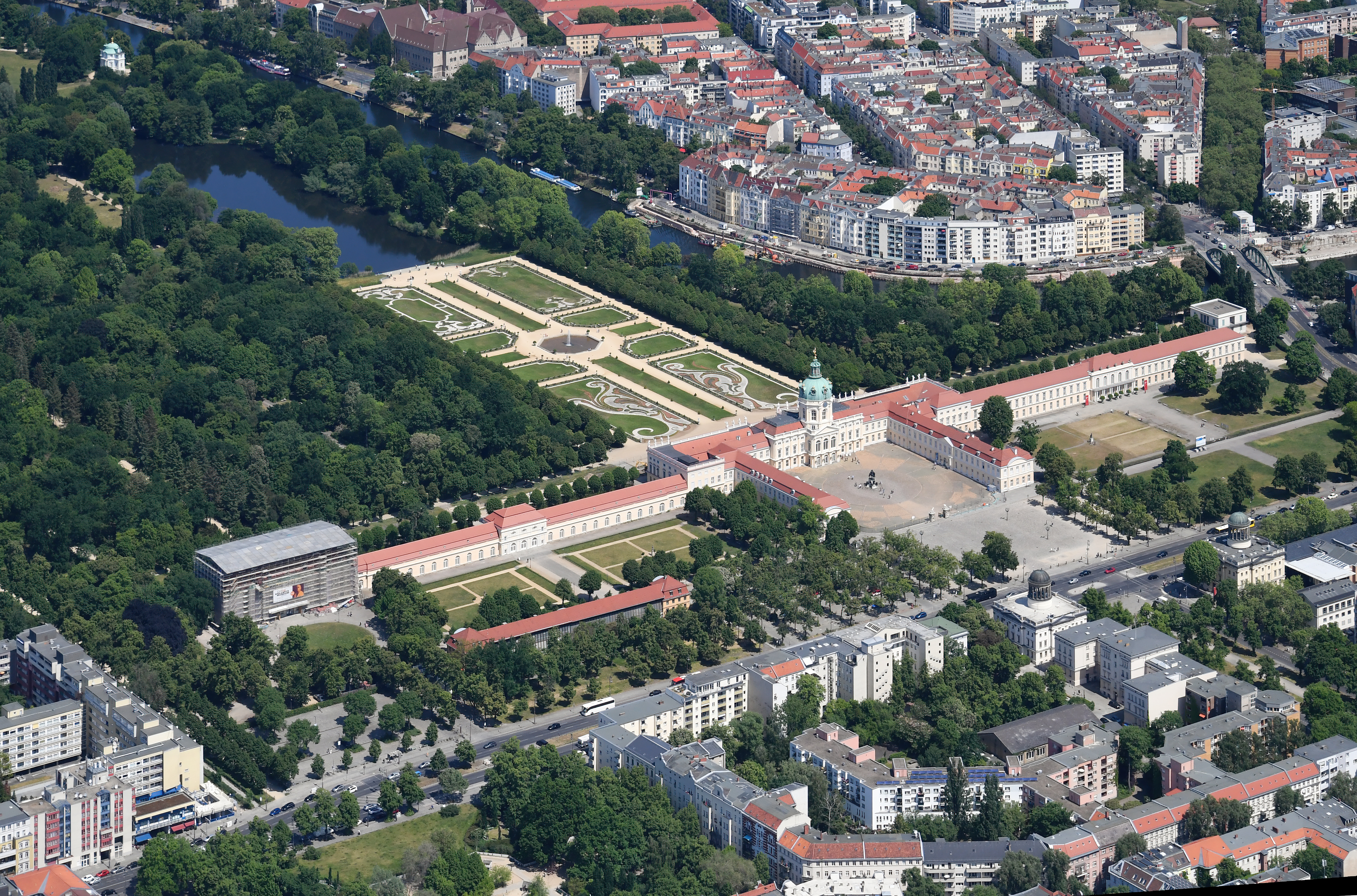
Aerial view of the gardens of Charlottenburg Palace

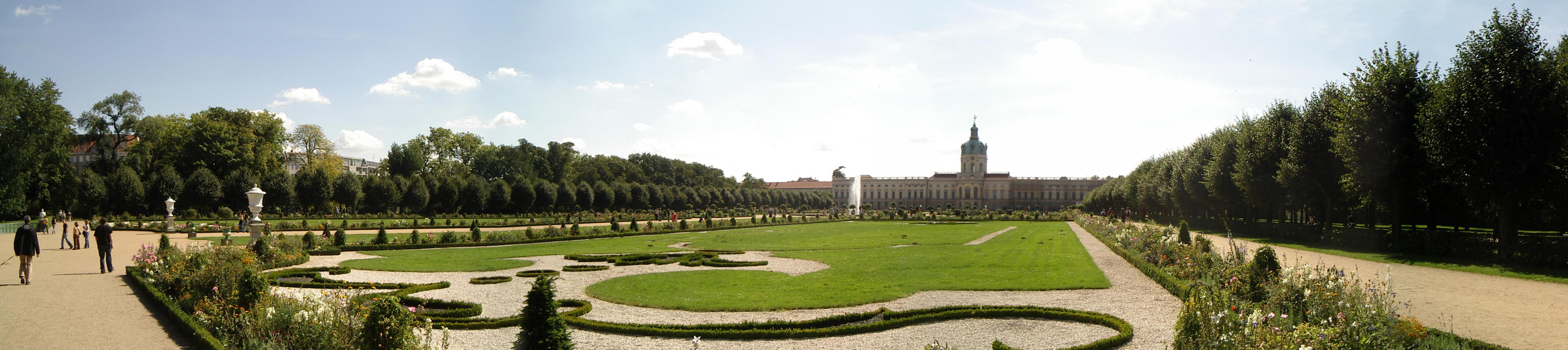
Gardens of Charlottenburg Palace

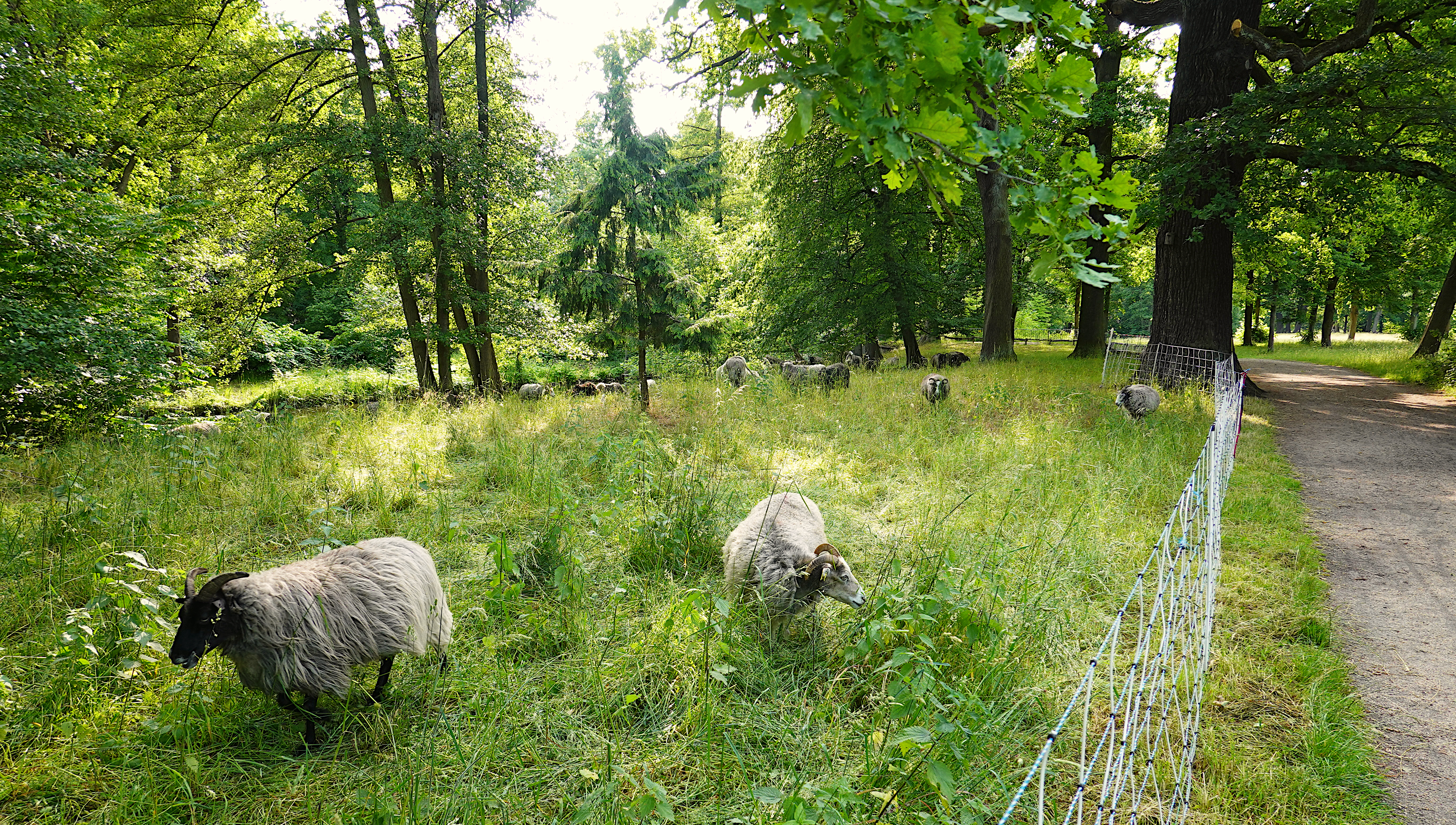
Gute sheep grazing in the Schlosspark grounds for summer

The garden was designed in 1697 in Baroque style by Simeon Godeau, who had been influenced by André Le Nôtre, designer of the gardens at Versailles. Godeau's design consisted of geometric patterns, with avenues and moats, which separated the garden from its natural surroundings. Beyond the formal gardens was the Carp Pond. Towards the end of the 18th century, a less formal, more natural-looking garden design became fashionable. In 1787, the royal gardener Georg Steiner redesigned the garden in the English landscape style for Frederick William II, the work being directed by Peter Joseph Lenné. After the Second World War, the centre of the garden was restored to its previous Baroque style.

In 1788, Frederick William II arranged for the building of the Belvedere, designed by Carl Gotthard Langhans, in the grounds beyond the Carp Pond. The building was used as a teahouse and as a viewing-tower. Langhans also designed the Palace Theatre, which was built between 1788 and 1791 to the west of the Orangery wing.

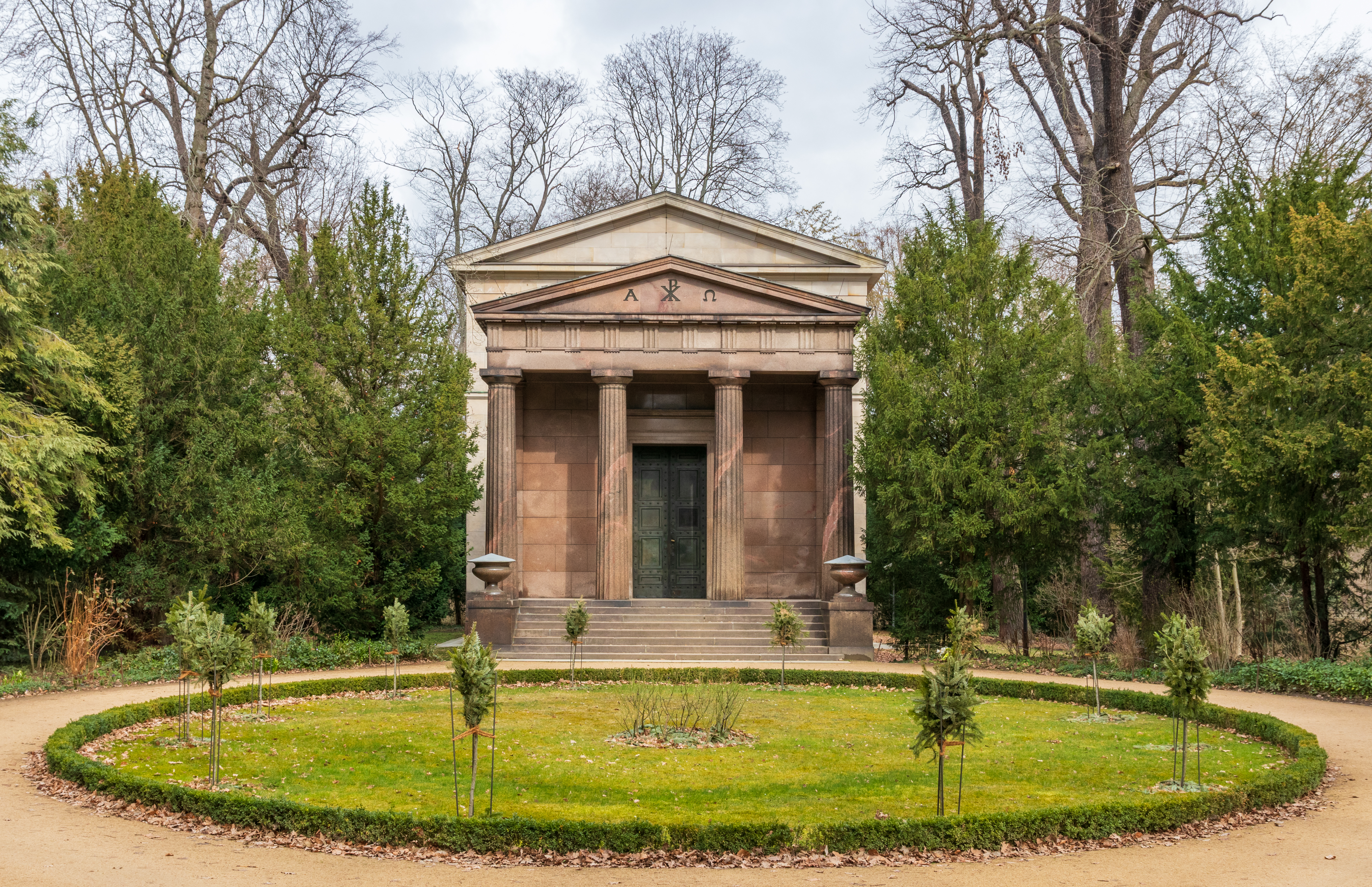
The Royal Mausoleum

The mausoleum was built as a tomb for Queen Louise between 1810 and 1812 in neoclassical style to a design by Heinrich Gentz. After the death of Frederick William III, it was extended; this design being by Karl Friedrich Schinkel. It was extended again in 1890–91 by Albert Geyer to accommodate the graves of William I, German Emperor and his wife Augusta of Saxe-Weimar. In 1825, Frederick William III added the New Pavilion, an Italianate villa designed by Schinkel, to the north of the palace. This was damaged in the war in 1943 and was reconstructed between 1957 and 1970.

=== Burials ===
- Louise of Mecklenburg-Strelitz
- Frederick William III of Prussia
- The heart of Frederick William IV of Prussia
- Prince Albert of Prussia
- Auguste von Harrach
- Wilhelm I, German Emperor
- Augusta of Saxe-Weimar-Eisenach, German Empress

== Today ==
Charlottenburg Palace entrance at night

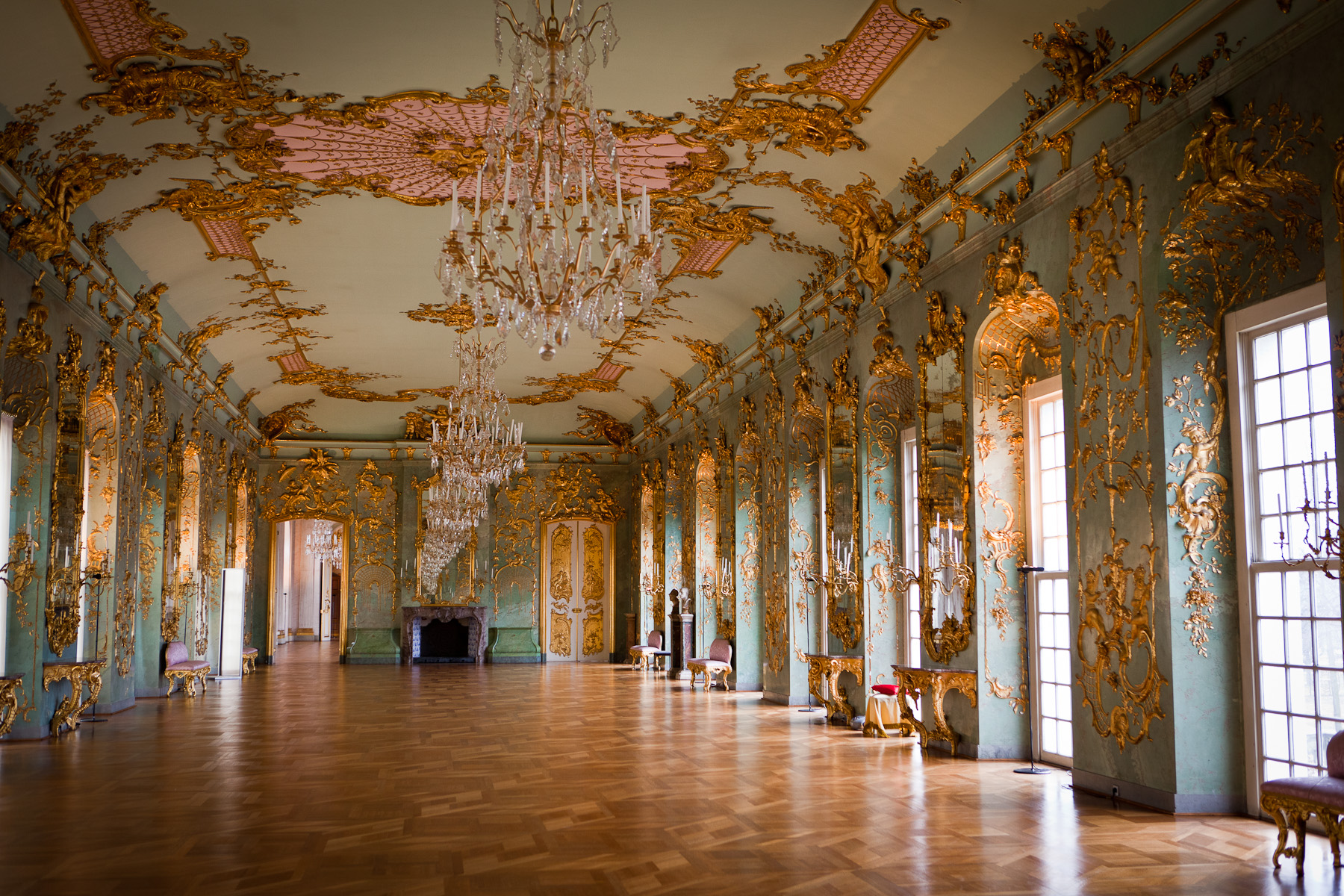
Golden Gallery (Goldene Galerie) in the New Wing (Neuer Flügel)

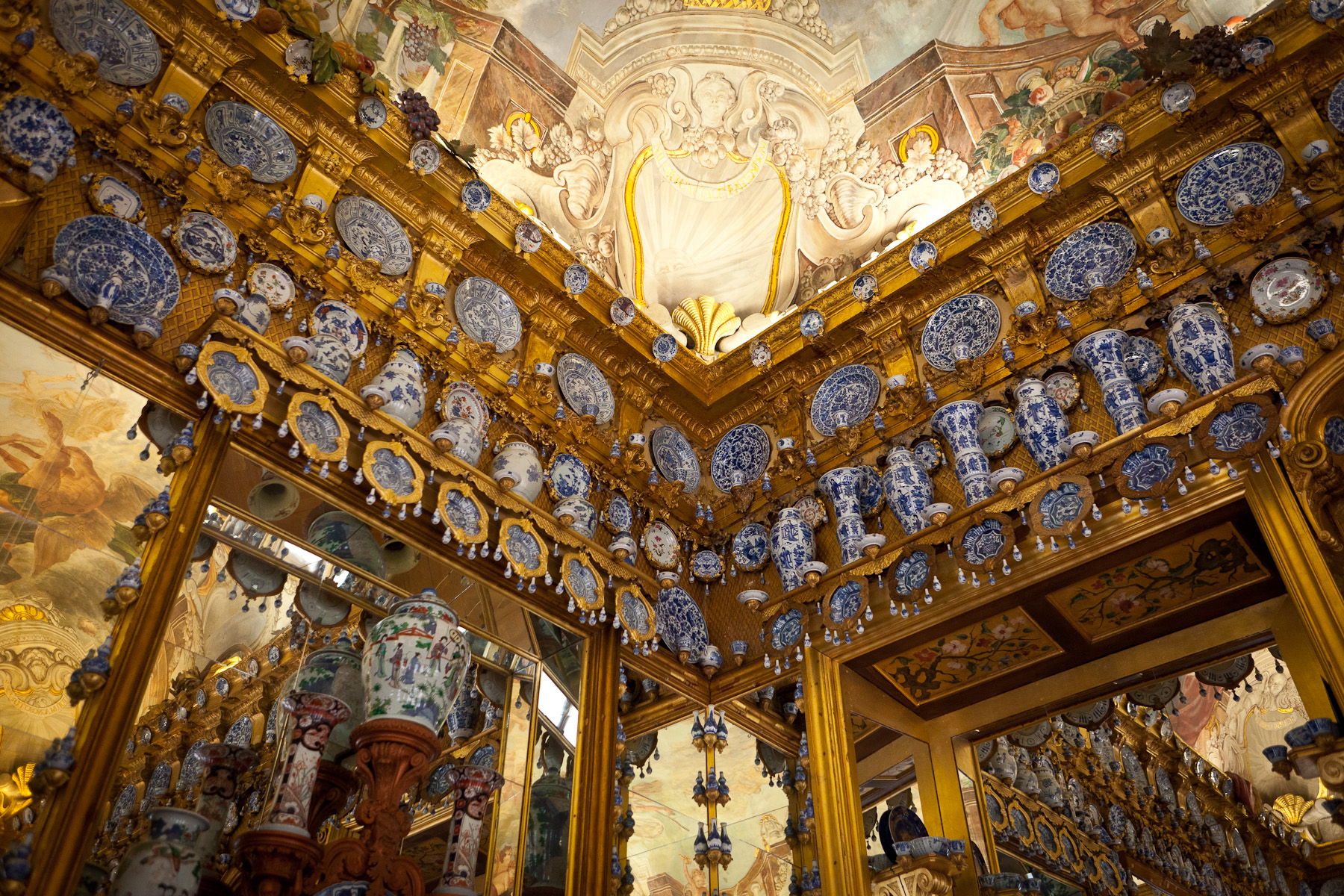
Porcelain Cabinet

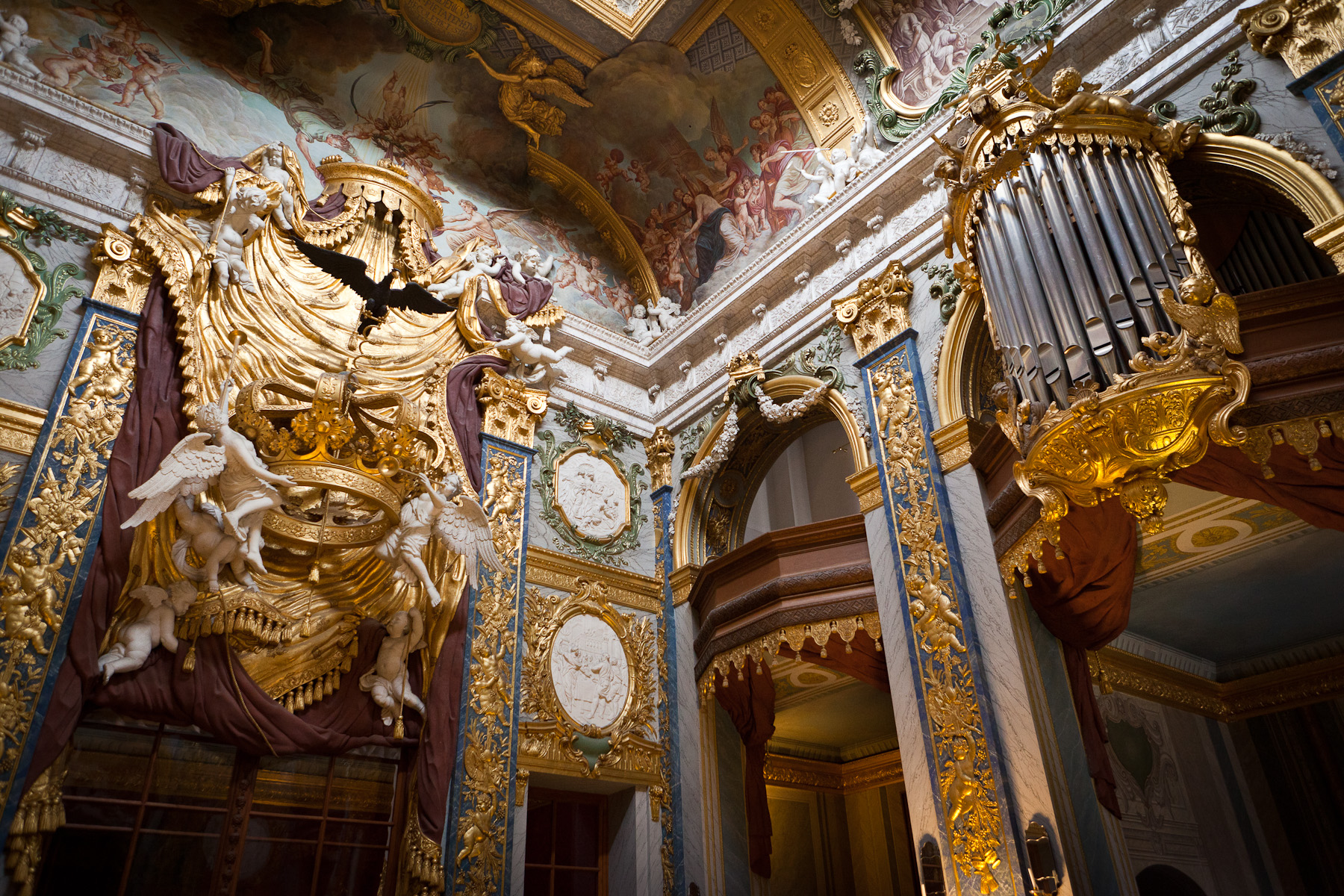
Palace chapel

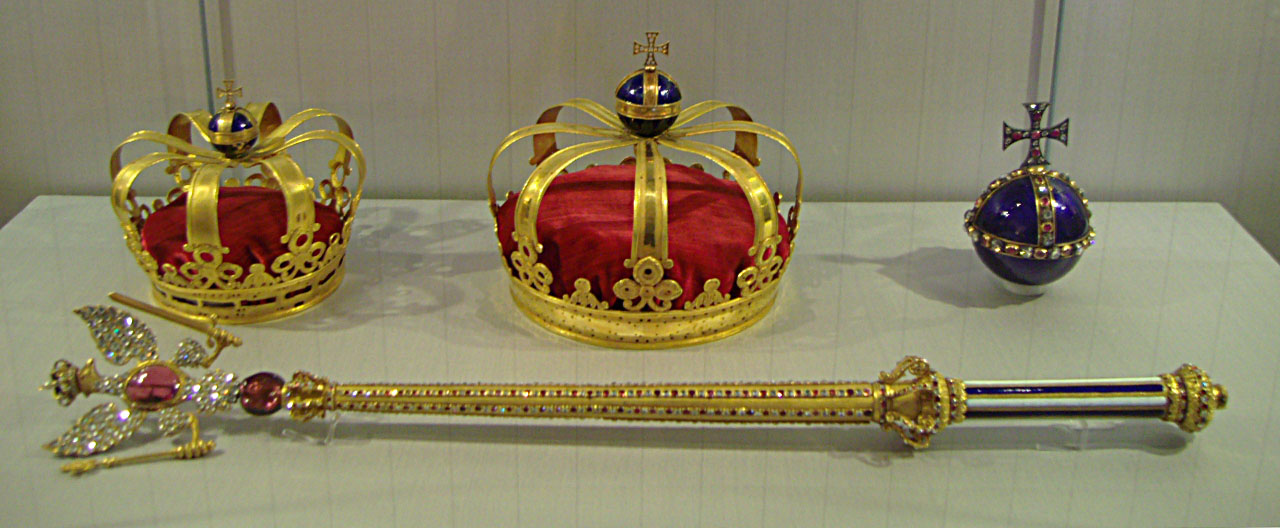
Prussian Crown Jewels, exhibition in the palace

The palace and grounds are a major visitor attraction.

- For an admission charge, parts of the interior of the palace are open to visitors, including the Old Palace (Alte Schloss) and the New Wing (Neuer Flügel). The Old Palace contains many rooms with baroque decoration, and includes a room called the Porcelain Cabinet, which holds thousands of porcelain objects. On special display are the crown jewels and the royal silver and fine porcelain tableware. The New Wing includes the opulent rococo State Apartments of Frederick the Great and the more modest Winter Chambers of Frederick William II. The formal and informal gardens are freely open to the public.
- For an admission charge, the Mausoleum, the Belvedere and the New Pavilion are open to visitors. The Mausoleum contains the graves of, and memorials to, members of the Hohenzollern family. The memorial to Queen Luise includes her reclining effigy, which is made from Carrara marble and was designed by Christian Daniel Rauch.
- Also open to the public are the Belvedere, which contains a collection of Berlin porcelain, and the New Pavilion, which houses a collection of arts and crafts of the period when Schinkel was active.
- The former Orangery houses a restaurant and café. Destroyed during World War II, the Great Orangery was reconstructed on the model of the baroque building. Today, it shines in its old brilliance again. The light-flooded festival room provides a pleasant framework for cultural events, concerts and banquets.
- In addition, a large equestrian statue of the Great Elector, Frederick William, is the focus of the palace courtyard. This was designed by Andreas Schlüter and made between 1696 and 1700. From 1703, it stood first on the Long Bridge and later on the same site on the Electors' Bridge (now the Rathausbrücke) but was moved to a place of safety in the Second World War. On its return after the war, the barge carrying it sank and it was not salvaged until 1949. In 1952, it was erected on its present site. Across the street of the palace are two more museums, the Bröhan Museum, which contains Art Nouveau and Art Deco articles, and the Berggruen Museum, which houses modern art, in particular works by Pablo Picasso and Paul Klee. On the left is the Scharf-Gerstenberg Collection. Its collection of paintings, graphics and sculptures, spanning the period from French romanticism to surrealism.

== See also ==
- List of Baroque residences
- List of castles in Berlin and Brandenburg
- Palaces and Parks of Potsdam and Berlin
- List of tourist attractions in Berlin

== Sources ==
- Hertzsch, Raimund (1998). Charlottenburg Palace. Peter B. Best (translator). Berlin: Kai Homilius Verlag. ISBN 3-89706-992-X.
