= Johann Arnold Nering =

German architect

Johann Arnold Nering (or Nehring; 13 January 1659 – 21 October 1695) was a German Baroque architect in the service of Brandenburg-Prussia.

A native of Wesel, Cleves, Nering was educated largely in Holland. From 1677 to 1679 he also travelled in Italy. In 1682 Nering worked on the gate and chapel of Köpenick Palace. He was appointed Oberingenieur (senior engineer) by Frederick William I, Elector of Brandenburg, in 1684. The following year Nering was appointed Ingenieur-Oberst (engineer colonel) within the General Staff.

After Frederick III came to power in 1688, Nering was tasked with overseeing the drafts of 300 two-storied burgher homes in the new town of Friedrichstadt. He also planned the layout of the Gendarmenmarkt and contributed to Schönhausen Palace. In Königsberg Nering designed the Burgkirche, constructed from 1690 to 1696.

Nering was appointed Oberbaudirektor (senior architectural director) for Brandenburg on 9 April 1691. He worked on Schloss Oranienburg (1690–94), the bridge Lange Brücke in Berlin (1692–95), the Hetzgarten in 1693, and the Parochialkirche and part of the Zeughaus in 1695. Georg Heinrich Kranichfeld used Nering's design for Schönhausen Palace during the construction of Holstein in East Prussia. Nering also originated the design of the Zeughaus (arsenal) on Unter den Linden in Berlin in the year of his death; it was completed in 1730 and became the modern-day Deutsches Historisches Museum.

Charlottenburg Palace, the royal residence of the Hohenzollern family in Berlin (finished 1713)

In 1695, Nering began designing Electress Sophia Charlotte's summer residence, later known as Charlottenburg Palace, but he died during its construction. Although the palace was subsequently greatly expanded, the original central section became known as the Neringbau. The architect was also honored by having a street near Charlottenburg Palace named after him in 1892.
