= Equestrian statue of the Great Elector =

Sculpture in Berlin, Germany

Equestrian statue of Friedrich Wilhelm
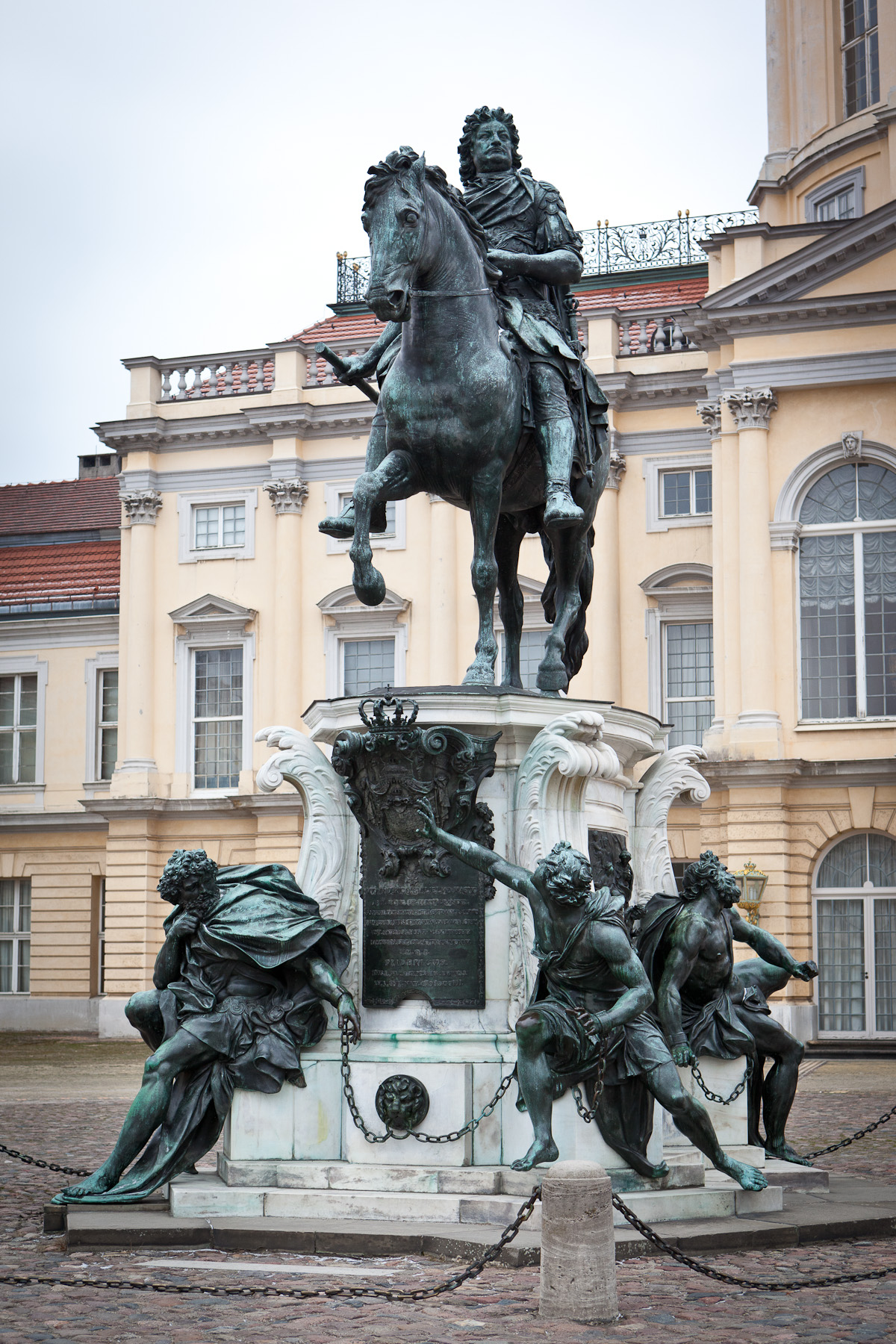
- The statue in front of Charlottenburg Palace (2011)
- Medium: Bronze
- Subject: Frederick William, Elector of Brandenburg
- Location: Berlin; 52°31′14″N 13°17′44.8″E

The equestrian statue of Frederick William, Elector of Brandenburg is a bronze equestrian statue installed outside Charlottenburg Palace in Berlin, Germany. It was designed by Andreas Schluter. Originally, it stood on the Rathaus Bridge next to Berlin Palace.

In the entrance hall of the Bode Museum in Berlin stands a copy of the equestrian statue on its original base.

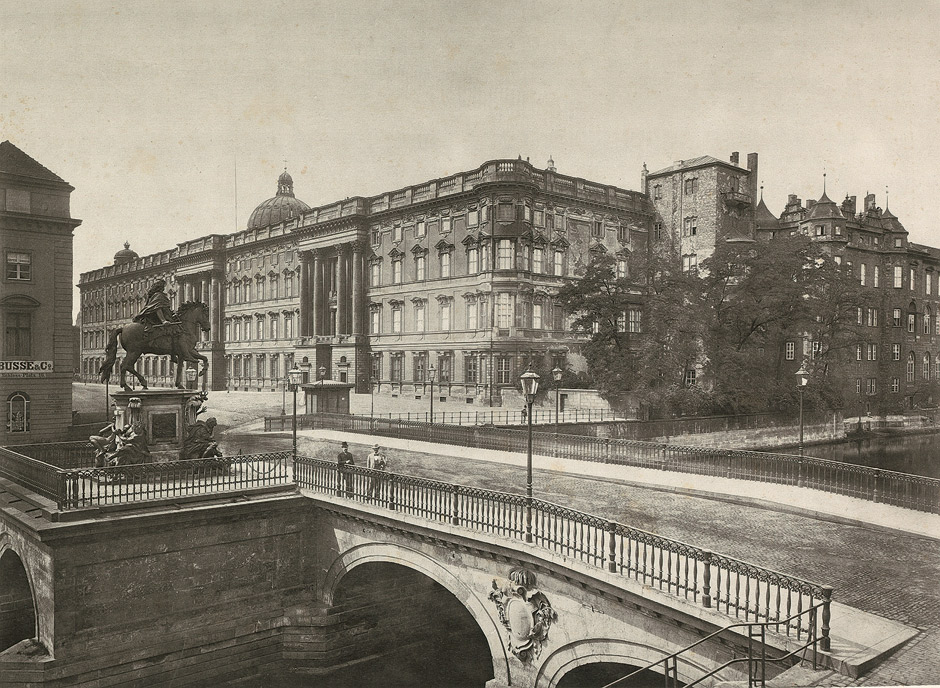
The statue on the Rathaus Bridge with Berlin Palace in 1874

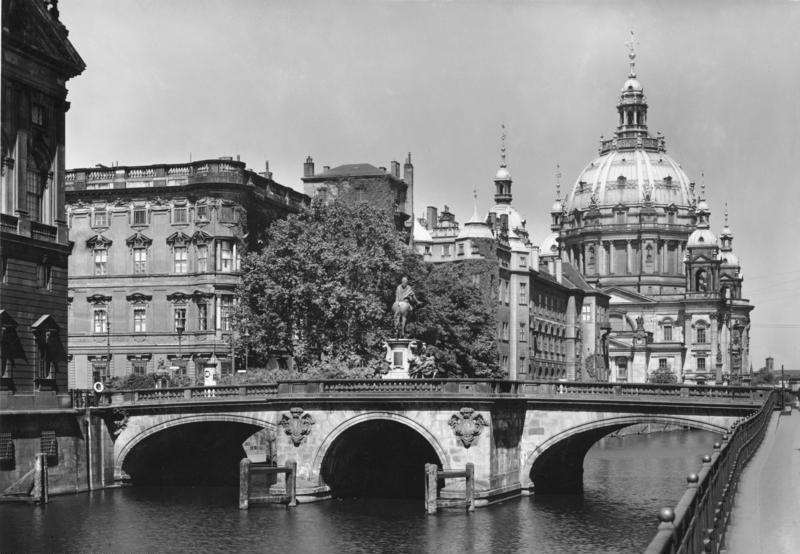
The statue on the Rathaus Bridge with Berlin Palace and Berlin Cathedral in 1936

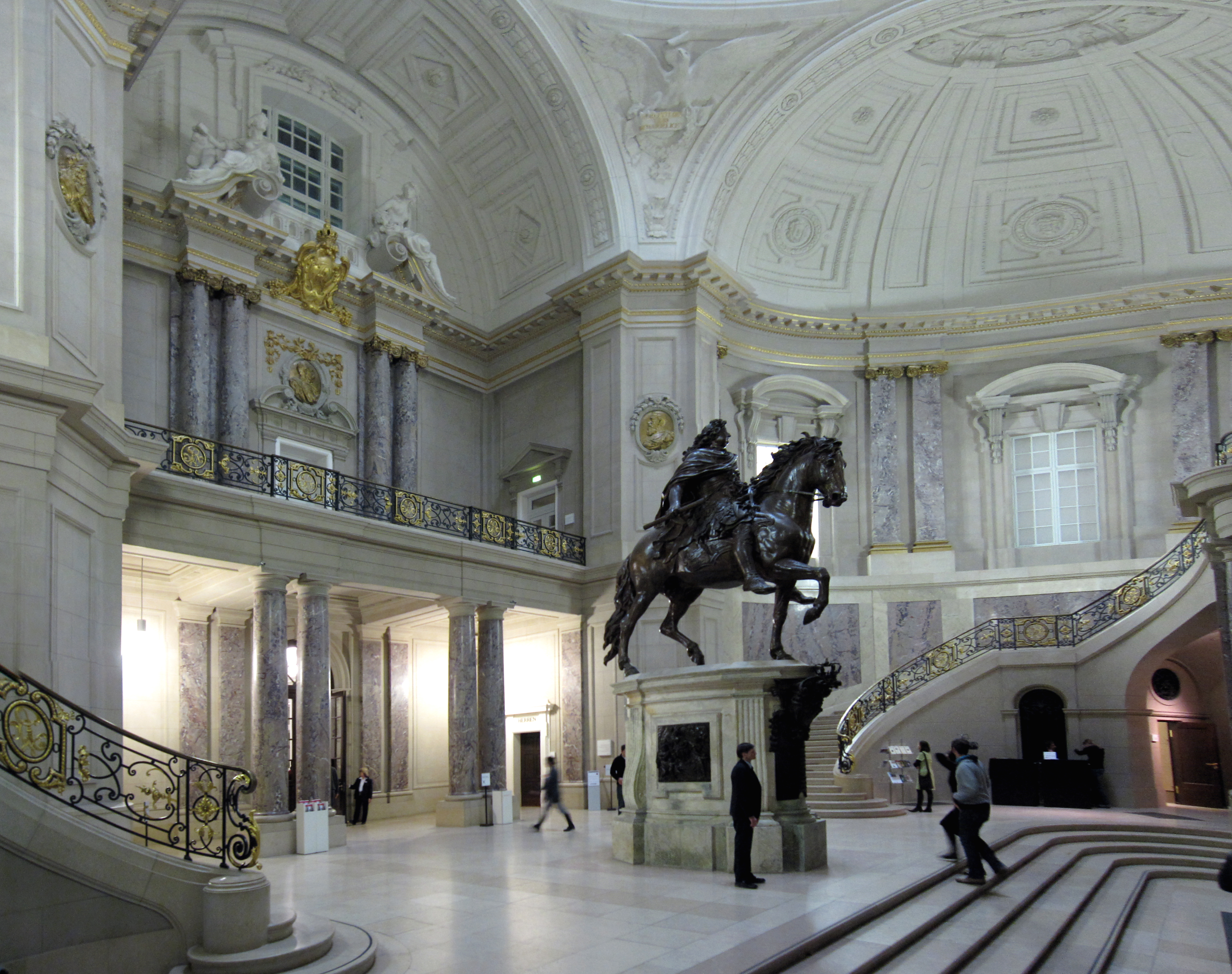
Copy of the figure and original base in the Bode Museum (2009)
