= Lange Brücke =

Bridge in Berlin, Germany

Coordinates: 52.4445°N 13.5718°E

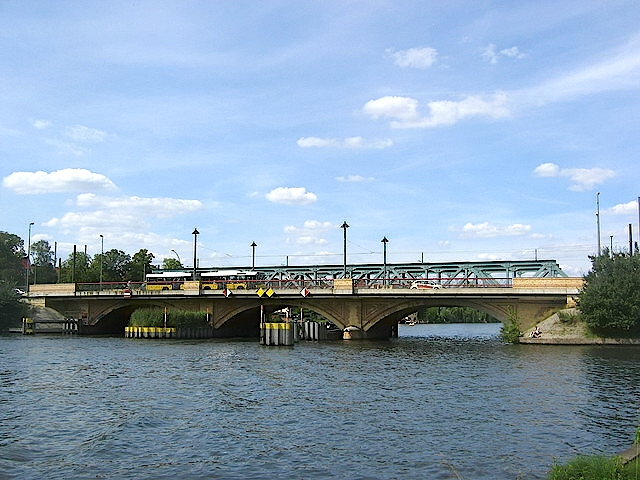

The Lange Brücke is a road bridge over the Dahme in the Berlin district of Köpenick. It represents an important traffic connection between the old town of Köpenick and the newer districts to the west and north-west. In the immediate vicinity of the bridge, on the right bank of the Dahme and south of the old town, is the castle island with the Köpenick castle.

The current bridge was originally built in 1892 as a stone arch bridge - as a successor to earlier Dahmeüberwege, which were made of wood and whose existence is documented from the beginning of the 15th century. In the 1930s, traffic was adjusted by means of a provisional widening using a “makeshift building”; In the late 1990s, the city administration had the bridge dismantled, completely refurbished and again widened with a modified construction. Since then there has been a temporary steel bridge next to the historic bridge, which is still used today as a temporary measure. The historic stone bridge has been a listed building since 1992.

For a long time the Dahmebrücke was referred to as the "Bridge of Sighs", which goes back to a legend about the cruel end of a pair of lovers from the Ascanian period (13th century). This bridge name and its origin are partly still known in Berlin today.
