= Humboldt Forum =

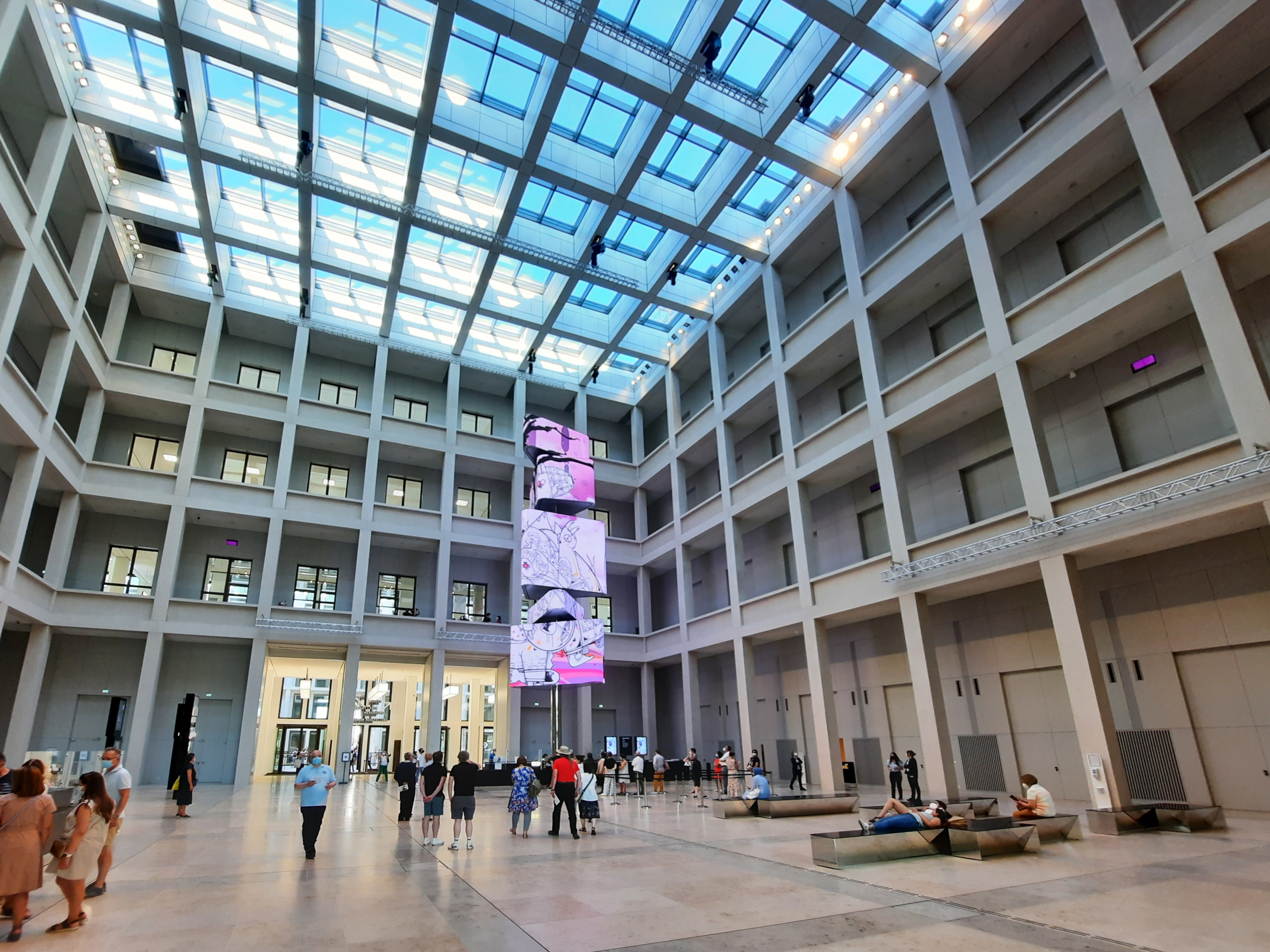
- Foyer of the Humboldt Forum, located inside the Berlin Palace
- Established: 2020
- Location: Berlin Palace, Berlin, Germany
- Coordinates: 52°31′03″N 13°24′10″E
- Type: Art museum
- Collections: non-European art
- Director: Hartmut Dorgerloh
- Architect: Franco Stella
- Public transit access: U: Museumsinsel
- Website: www.humboldtforum.org/en/

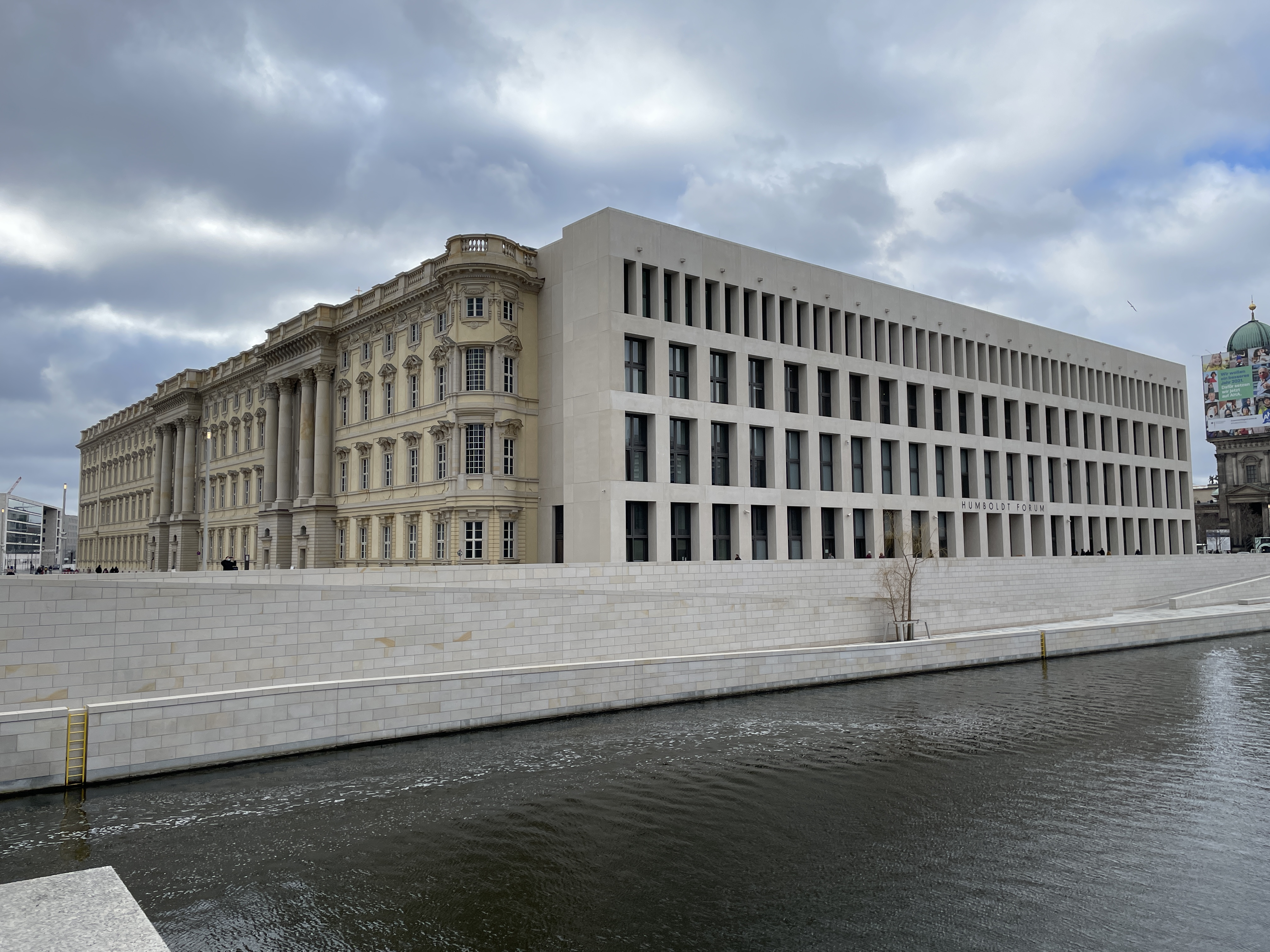
Façade of towards the Spree river

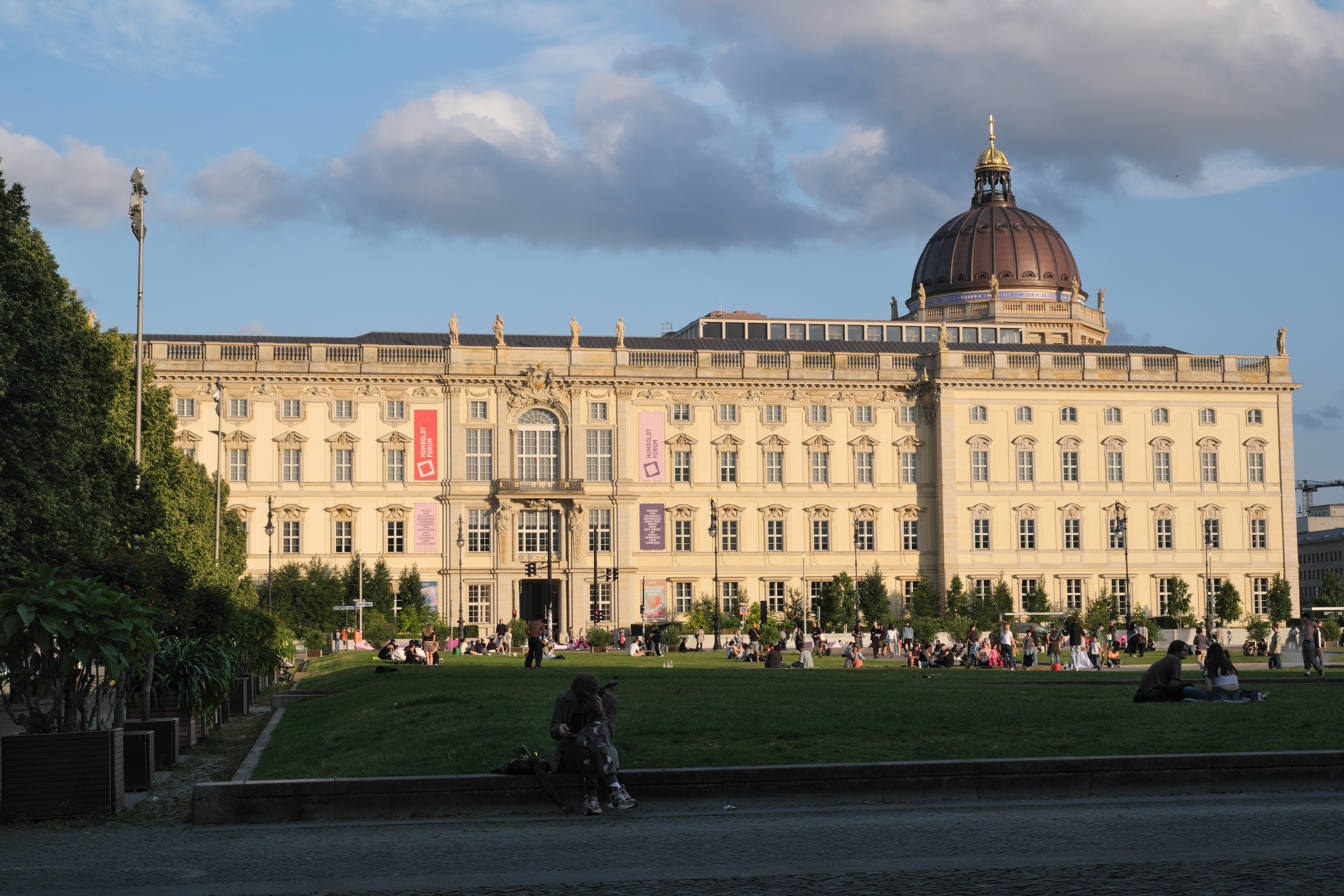
Banner of the Humboldt Forum on the façade of Berlin Palace

The Humboldt Forum is a museum dedicated to human history, art and culture, located in the Berlin Palace on the Museum Island in the historic centre of Berlin. It is named in honour of the Prussian scholars Wilhelm and Alexander von Humboldt. Considered the "German equivalent" of the British Museum, the Humboldt Forum houses the non-European collections of the Berlin State Museums, temporary exhibitions and public events. Due to the COVID-19 pandemic, it opened digitally on 16 December 2020 and became accessible to the general public on 20 July 2021.

In 2023, the Humboldt Forum recorded approximately 1.7 million entries, counted by sensors at the building's entrances. The foundation described the institution as the most visited museum in Germany. However, this figure includes all persons entering the building, including visitors to restaurants, shops, and events, and differs from international standards that typically count only museum visitors. Consequently, the Humboldt Forum does not appear in international museum attendance rankings such as those published by The Art Newspaper.

== History ==
The Humboldt Forum incorporates the exhibitions of two museums, the Ethnological Museum of Berlin and the Museum of Asian Art. Both had their roots in the Ancient Prussian Art Chamber. The Ancient Prussian Art Chamber was originally established by Joachim II Hector, Elector of Brandenburg in the mid 16th century, but was nearly destroyed during the Thirty Years' War (1618–1648). The art chamber was rebuilt as a magnificent collection by Frederick William, Elector of Brandenburg, and was moved to the newly extended Berlin Palace by Frederick I of Prussia in the early 18th century. The Ethnological Museum opened in 1886 as a successor of the Ancient Prussian Art Chamber; the Museum of Asian Art originated as the Indian Department of the Ethnological Museum in 1904. Wilhelm von Bode, the Director-General of the Royal Museums in Berlin, established the Museum of East Asian Art as a separate collection in 1906. In 2006 the Museum of Indian Art and the Museum of East Asian Art were merged to form the Museum of Asian Art.

From 2020 the Ethnological Museum and the Museum of Asian Art are both part of the Humboldt Forum in the Berlin Palace. By 2019, the Forum's overall costs totaled $700 million; at the time, it was considered Europe's most expensive cultural project. Its opening was initially planned for autumn 2019, then delayed to 2020 due to technical problems, including with its air conditioning system. Delivery delays and the unavailability of workers during a lockdown due to the COVID-19 pandemic in Germany pushed it back a few months further. In April 2020, two tar cookers exploded at the construction site, injuring one worker.

On 16 September 2022, the opening of the eastern wing, the last section of the Humboldt Forum museum, meant the Humboldt Forum museum was finally opened to the public. It became Germany's most expensive cultural project to date.

== Building ==
The Humboldt Forum has its seat in the reconstructed Berlin Palace. The foundation stone was laid by President Joachim Gauck in a ceremony on 12 June 2013.

== Museum ==
On completion in 2020, the City Palace housed the Ethnological Museum of Berlin and the Museum of Asian Art, as well as two restaurants, a theater, a movie theater and an auditorium. The project was headed by a three-member management committee, chaired by founding director Neil MacGregor and also including the co-directors, archaeologist Hermann Parzinger and art historian Horst Bredekamp. The Foundation for the Humboldt Forum in the Berlin Palace had been set up to create the museum.

In 2018, Neil MacGregor stepped down from his position as founding director of the Humboldt Forum. Although the departure was officially described as the natural end of his term, several commentators interpreted it as a response to mounting institutional and political frustrations. However, his tenure was reportedly marked by increasing tension with German bureaucratic structures and divergent cultural policy expectations. After Hartmut Dorgerloh was appointed General Director on June 1, 2018, the founding directorship also came to an end. Dorgerloh's contract runs until 2028.

=== Collections ===
The Humboldt Forum houses four major wings, covering America, Africa, Asia, Oceania. It also has several other galleries, including the Humboldt Lab, the Berlin Exhibition, Sounds of the World, and spaces for temporary exhibitions.

== Roof Terrace ==
The Humboldt Forum has a roof terrace with a restaurant. At a height of 30 meters, it offers views of the Berlin Cathedral and Museum Island to the north, the Rotes Rathaus and the Fernsehturm to the east, the Neuer Marstall and the State Council Building to the south and the boulevard Unter den Linden and the Brandenburg Gate to the west.

== Controversies ==
The Humboldt Forum came under criticism before and after its 2020 opening due to the museum's ownership of stolen art and other artifacts which were acquired from the German colonial empire and other European colonies in Africa and Asia, such as the Benin Bronzes. In 2018, it was at the center of a debate about the legality of cultural heritage from former German colonies being put on display in Germany, drawing protests from activists and art historians including as Bénédicte Savoy, who alleged the museum had not done enough to research the provenance and failed to critically present objects originating from the Global South in its collection.

A comprehensive critical presentation and analysis of the Humboldt Forum's entire planning process was published in 2024.

In October 2024 the Forum announced an alteration to the lyrics of Udo Lindenberg's 1983 song "Sonderzug nach Pankow" in an upcoming choir performance. In 1983 Lindenberg had used the word "Oberindianer" to address East Germany's head of state Erich Honecker. The Humboldt Forum said the word could be perceived as hurtful and racist by indigenous people and other visitors and would be changed. Critics like Wolfgang Kubicki saw the changes as violation of artistic freedom, while historian Hubertus Knabe said the Humboldt Forum was leaning towards a "far-left cult" and argued that the people responsible should be voted out of office.

The inadequate or insensitive handling of the collection also drew widespread criticism. For instance, during a project led by Bernhard Heeb to address the context of colonial injustice surrounding East African skulls.

== Gallery ==
Some of the highlights on display at the Humboldt Forum:

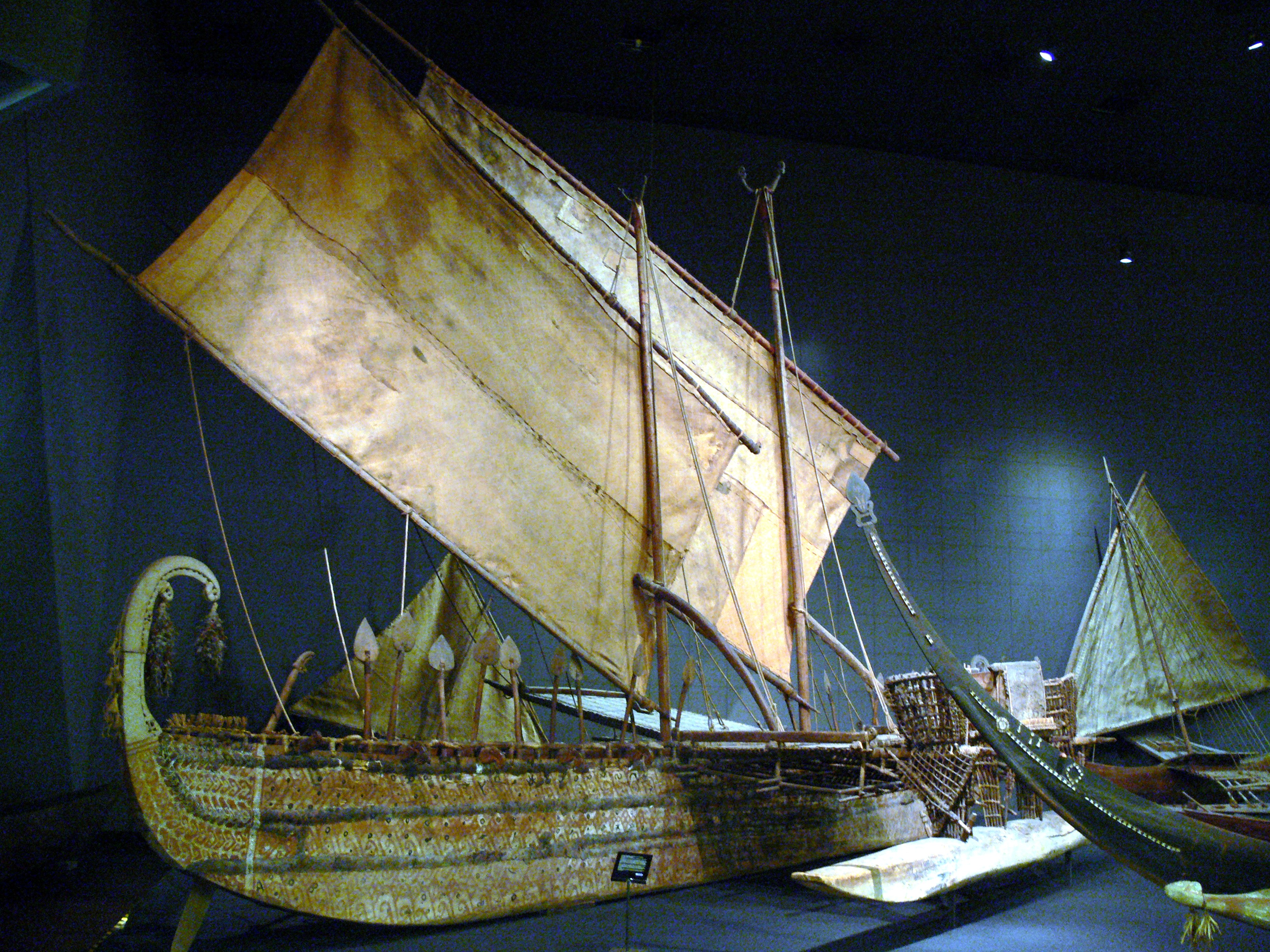
historical boat from the island of Luf in modern Papua New Guinea

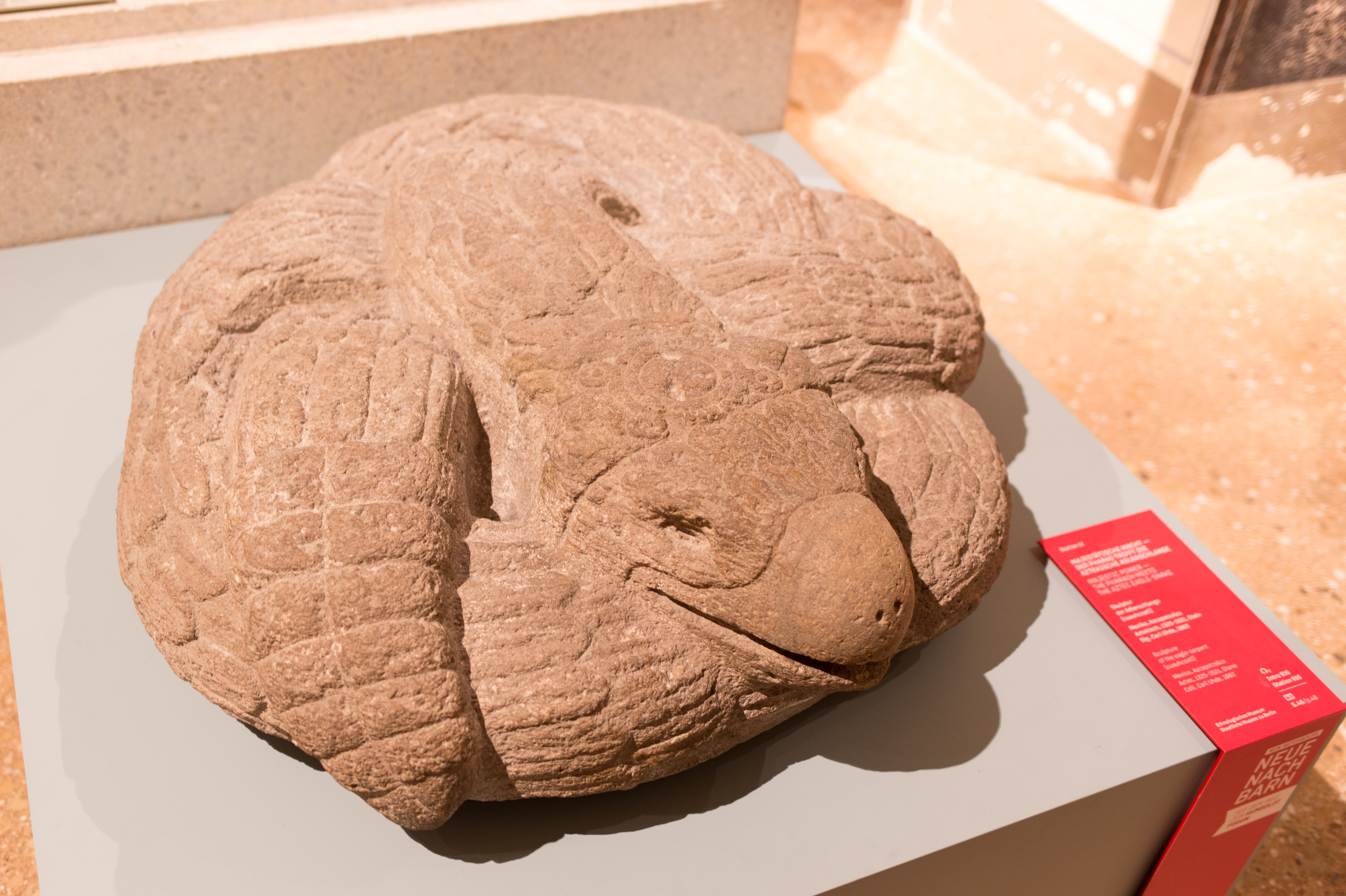
Cuauhcoatl

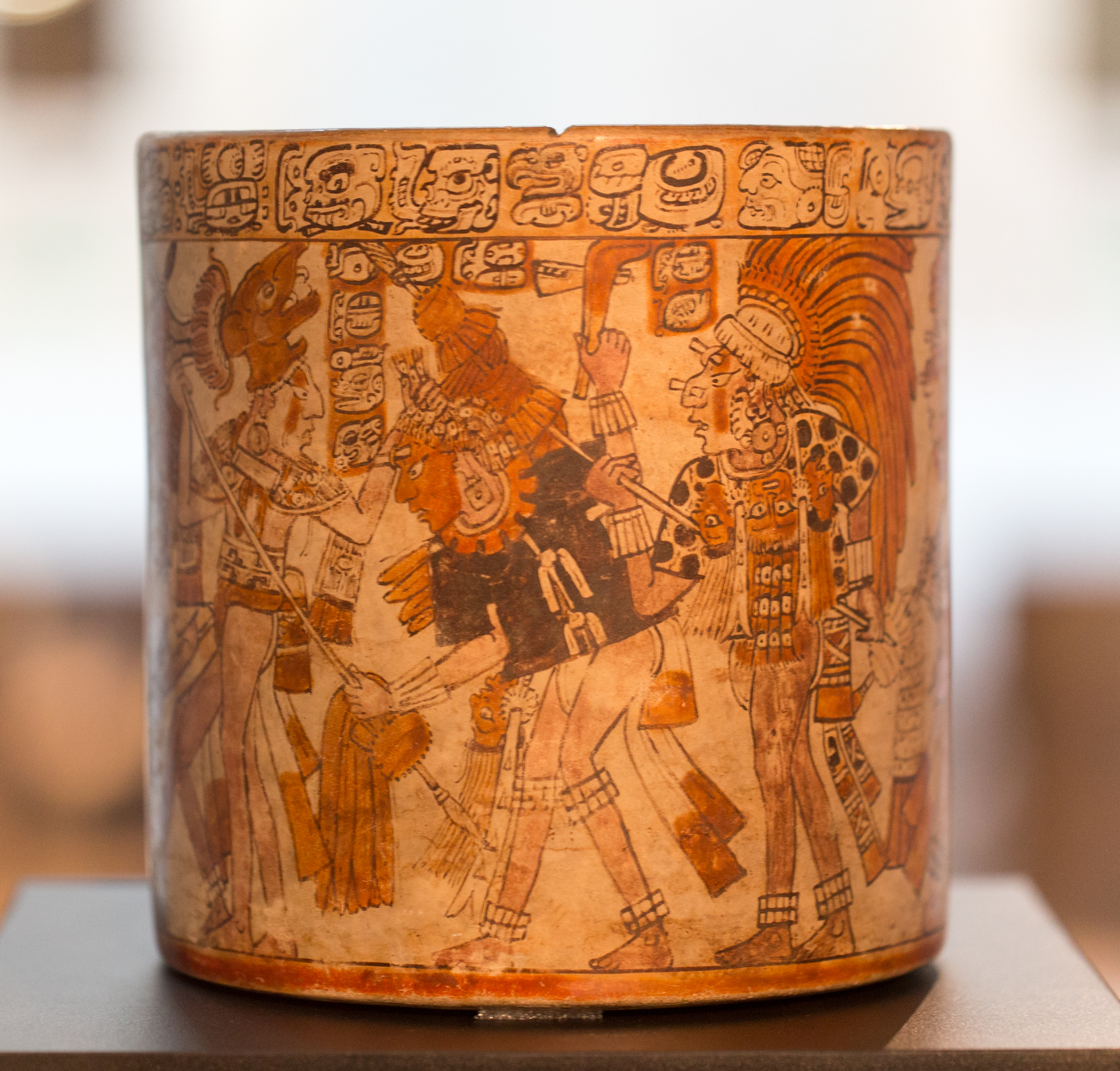
Mayan chocolate beaker

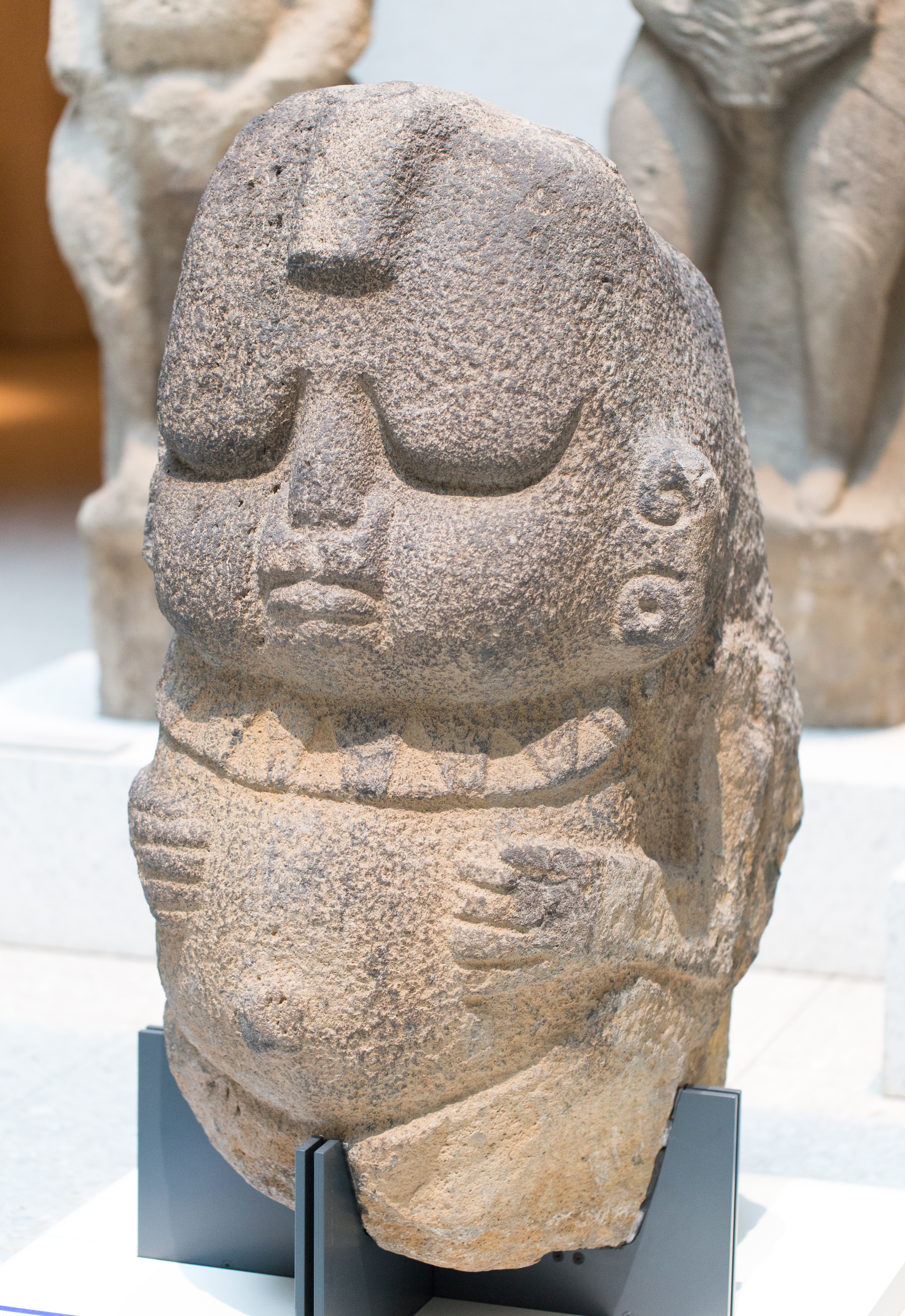
The Barrigon, a potbelly sculpture

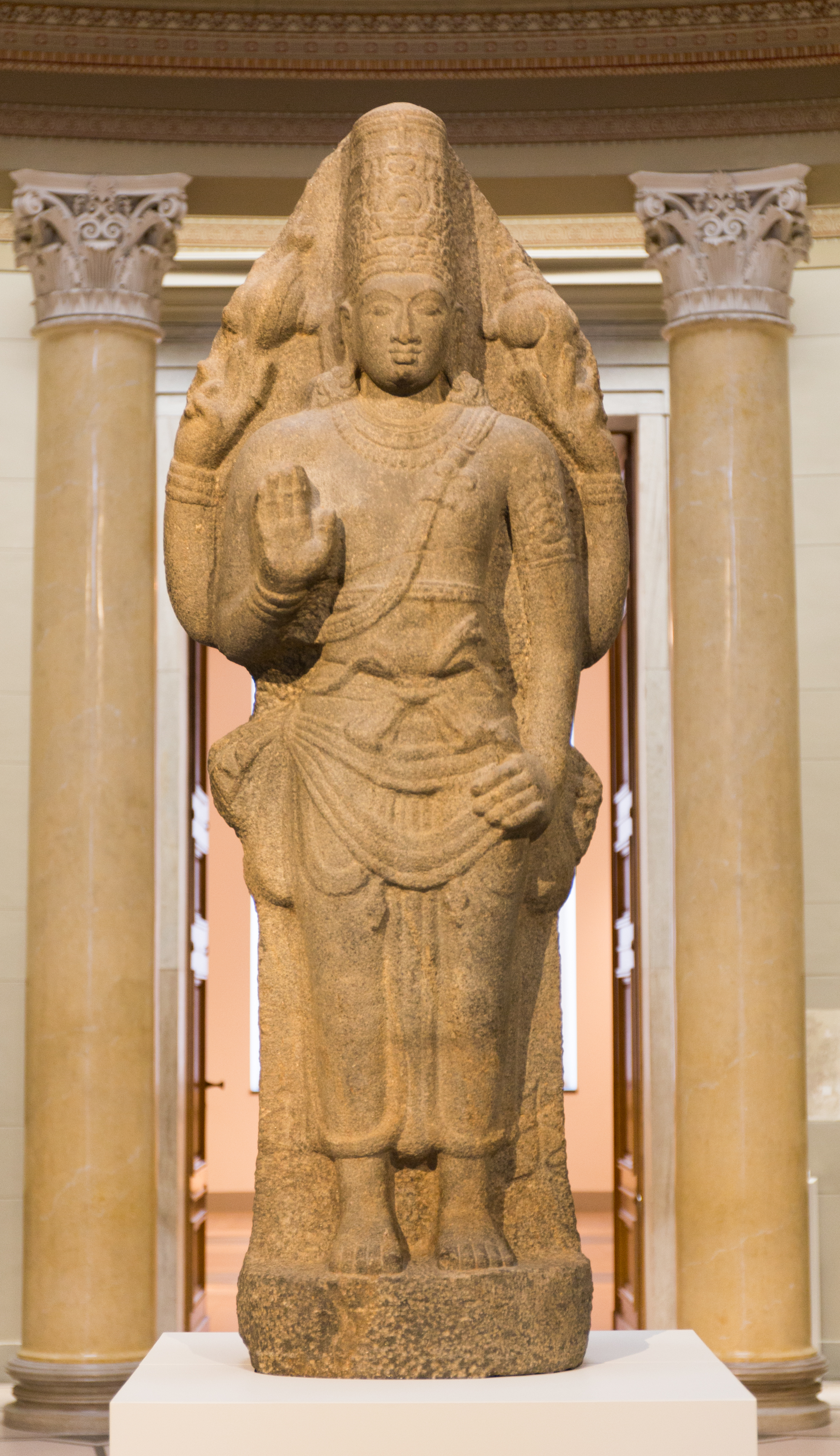
Vishnu

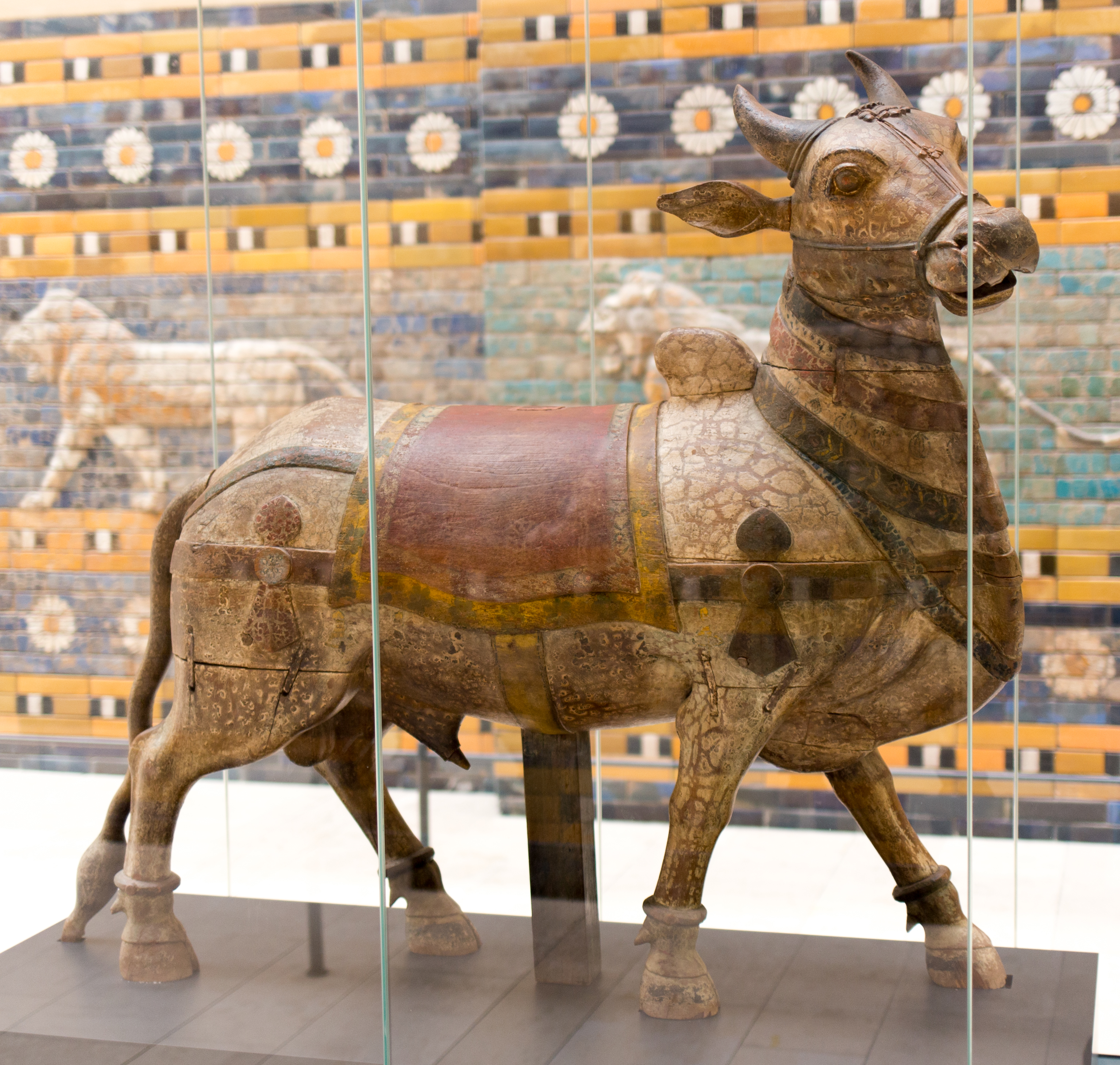
Nandi

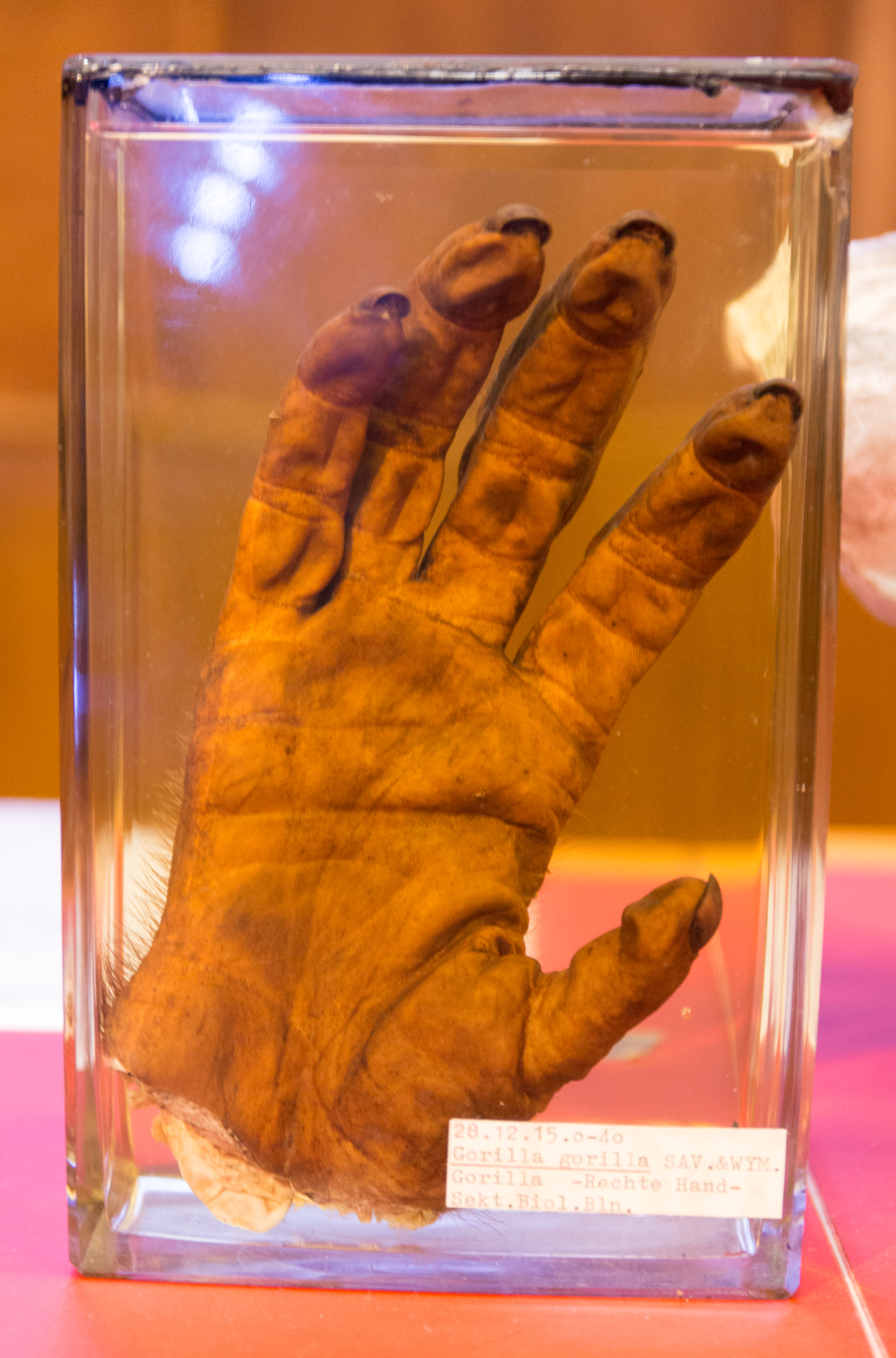
Hand of a Western gorilla

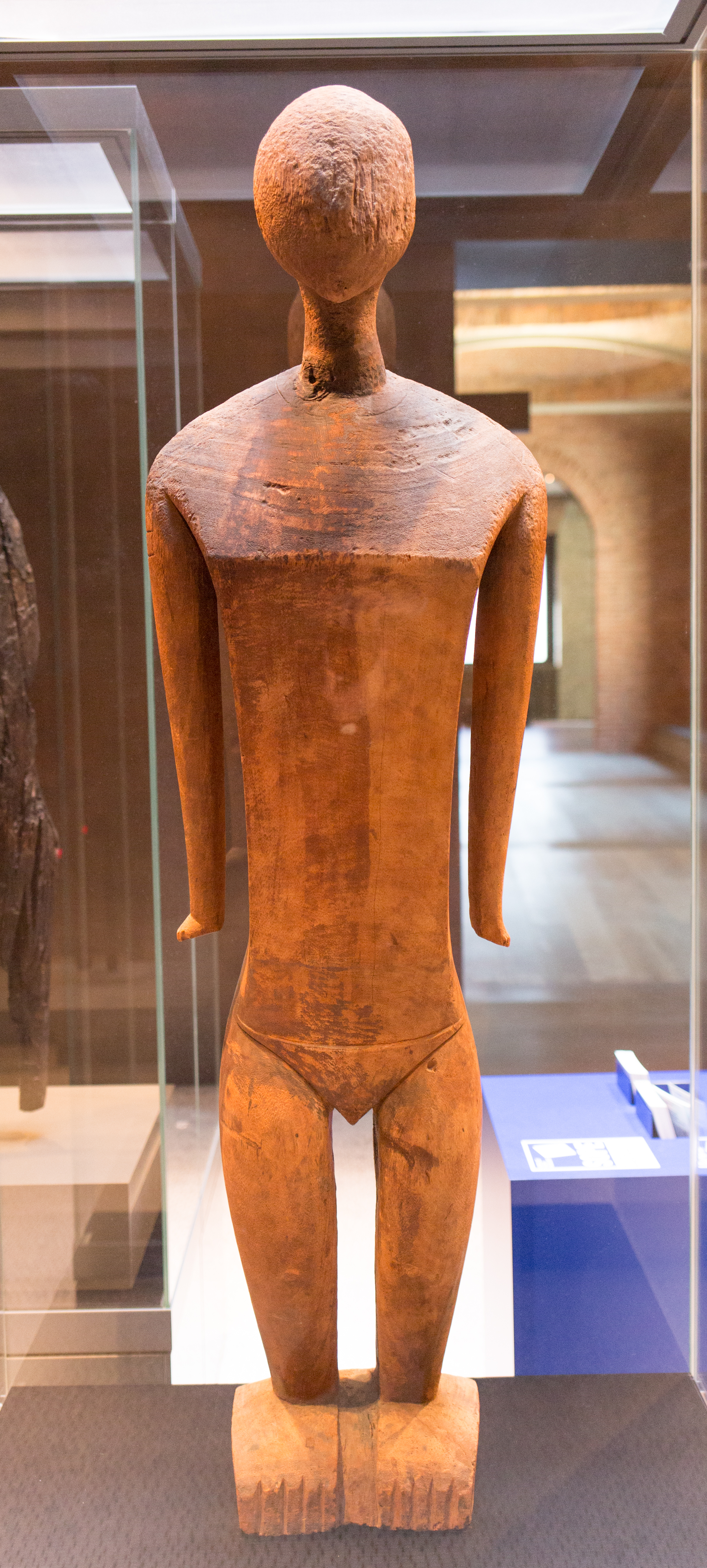
Sope

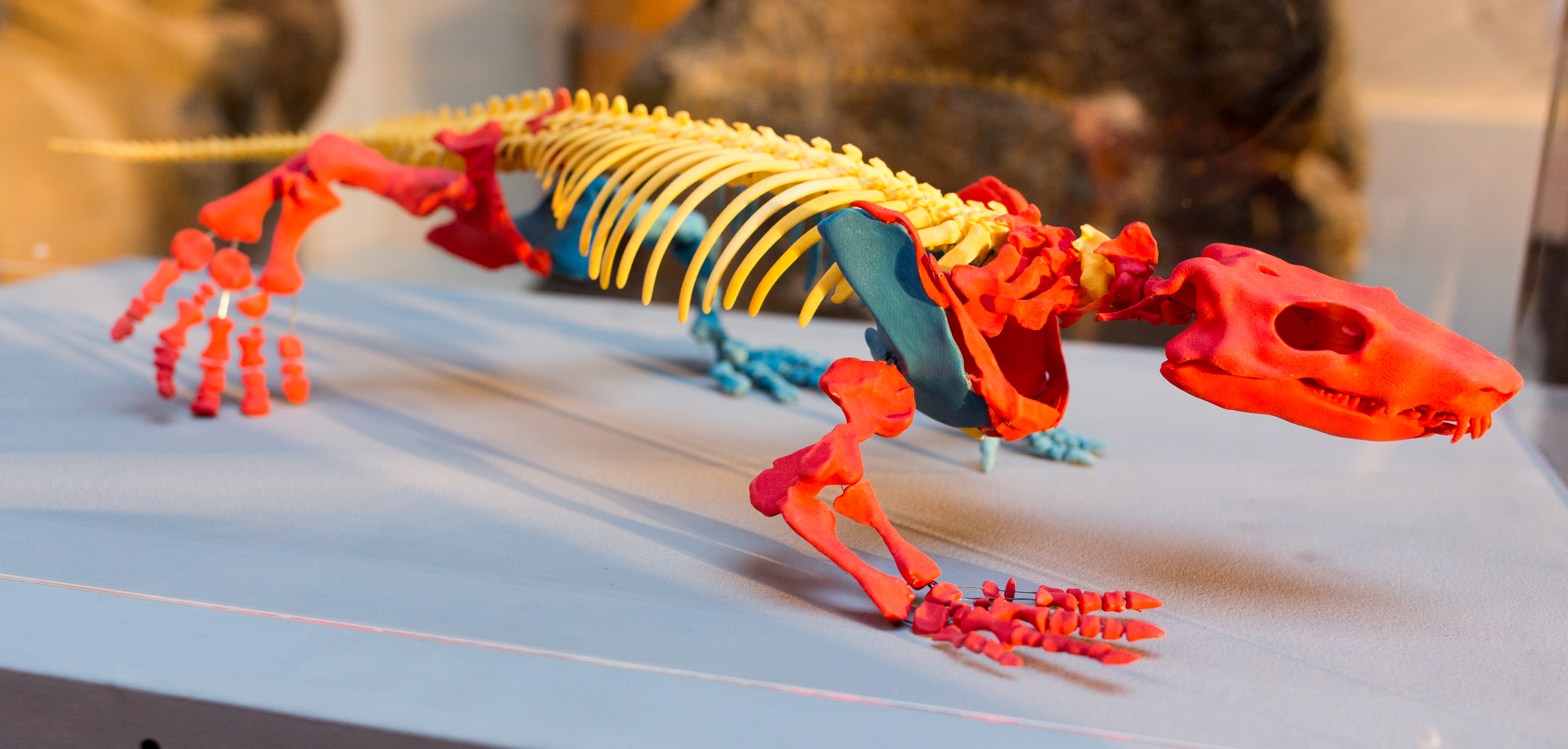
Model of an Orobates pabsti: red parts are reconstructed from the fossil, blue parts are mirrors, and yellow parts are some estimations.

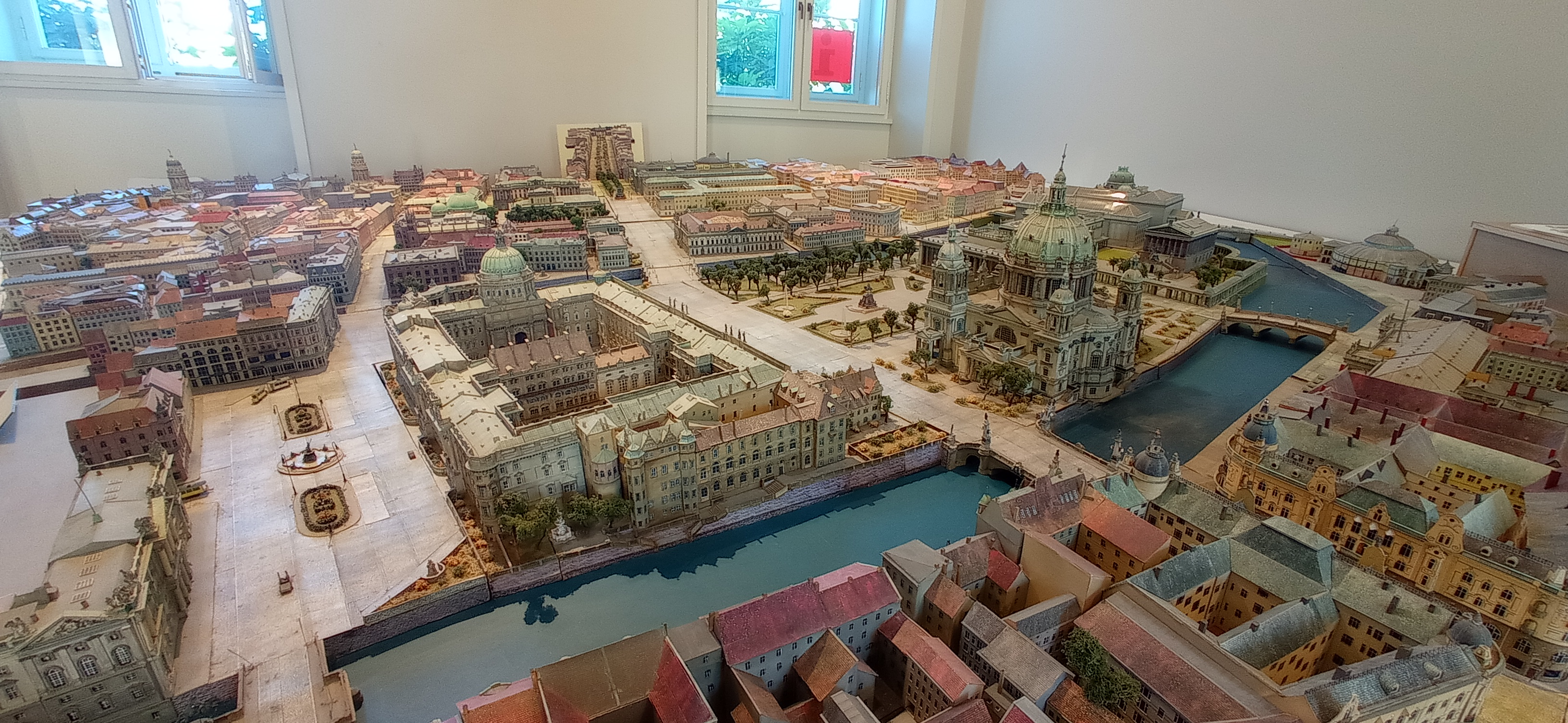
City model in the tourist information room next to Schlüterhof

== See also ==
- Museum Island
