= Franco Stella =

Italian architect

Francesco Stella (born 24 April 1943), known professionally as Franco Stella, is an Italian architect.

== Life ==
Stella studied at the Università Iuav di Venezia in Venice. In the early 1970s he undertook teaching and research at Gruppo Architettura. In 1973 he was professor of architecture design at the IUAV. He has been Professor of Architectural Design at the Faculty of Architecture of the University of Genoa. In architectural terms, Stella views himself as a representative of classic modern rationalism.

On 28 November 2008, he won the architectural competition for the design of the reconstruction of the Berlin City Palace / Humboldt Forum.

== Buildings and designs (selection) ==
- Head office ESTEL in Thiene (Veneto), 1972-1976
- Several school buildings in Veneto, 1970
- Villa Thiene 1990
- Hall of Maserà di Padova, 1990
- Competition design for the Berlin Chancellery, 1994
- Design for the enlargement of the Stockholm City Library
- Two exhibition halls of the fair in Padua (along with Walter A. Noebel), 1998-2002
- Design for the Naumburg Nietzsche memorial
- Berlin Palace - Humboldt Forum

== Literature ==
- Francesco Moschini: Franco Stella: Progetti di architettura, 1970–1990. Edizioni Kappa, Rom 1991, ISBN 88-7890-031-1.
- Valter Balducci: Franco Stella: Progetti per la fiera di Padova. Il Polirafo, Padua 2005.
- Federico Motta Editore (Hrsg.): Franco Stella. Mailand, 2005. ISBN 88-7179-512-1 (Werkbuch)
- Franco Stella: Schriften und Entwürfe. In: Franco Stella, Peter Stephan: Franco Stella. DOM Publishers, Berlin 2010, Bd. 1.
