= Foundation for the Humboldt Forum in the Berlin Palace =

Berlin Palace–Humboldtforum Foundation
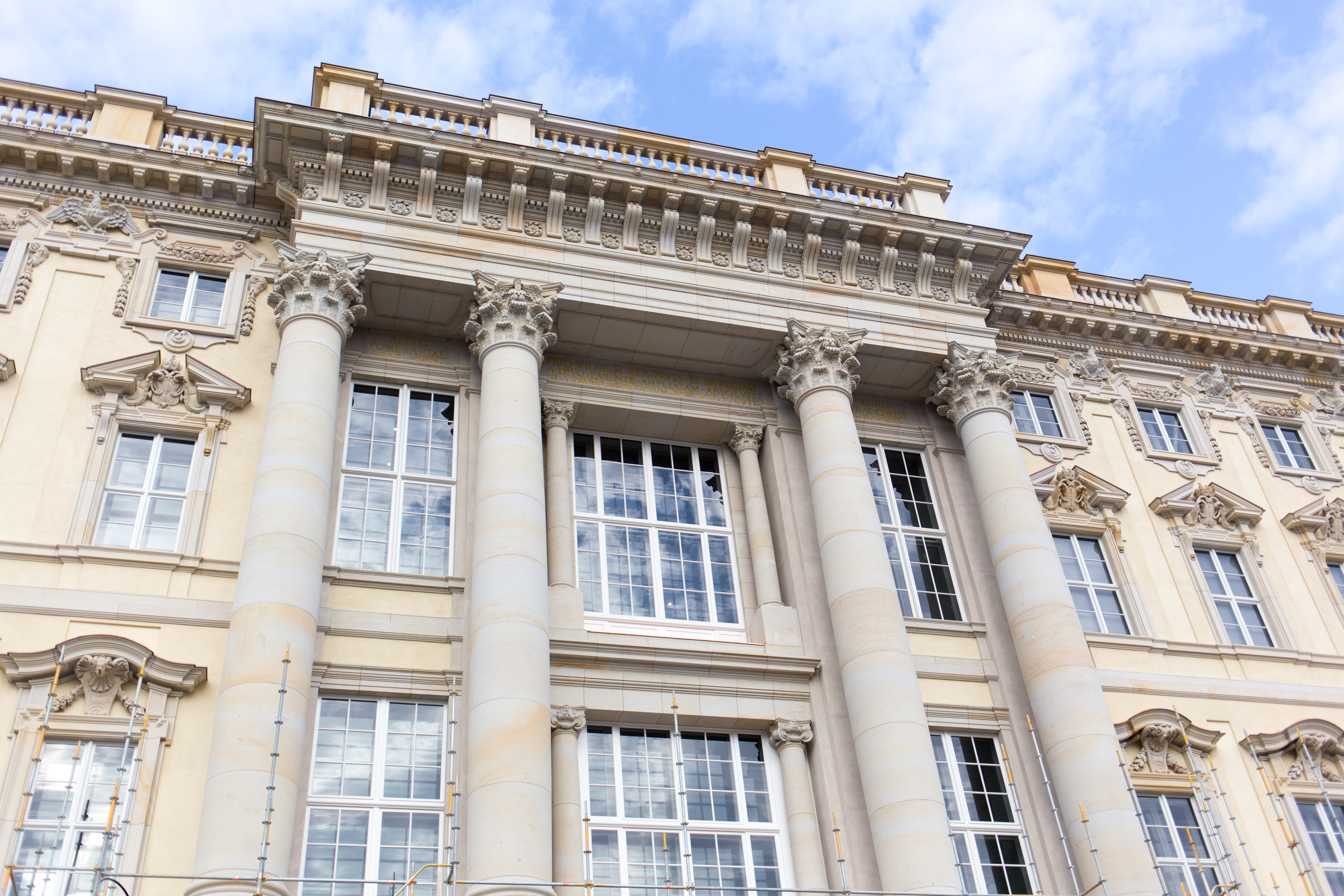
- Established: 2 July 2009
- Mission: promoting art and culture, education, international thinking and tolerance in all areas of culture, understanding between peoples and the preservation and maintenance of sites of cultural heritage
- Chair: Prof. Dr. Hartmut Dorgerloh (General Director and Chief Cultural Officer), Johannes Wien (chairman and spokesman), Lavinia Frey (management culture), Hans-Dieter Hegner (management construction)
- Endowment: Federal
- Location: Berlin, Germany
- Website: humboldtforum

Current logo

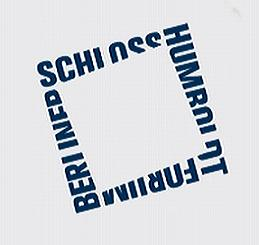
Former logo

The Foundation for the Humboldt Forum in the Berlin Palace (German: Stiftung Humboldt Forum im Berliner Schloss) is a German foundation established by the Government of Germany to create the Humboldt Forum museum in the reconstructed City Palace, Berlin. It works closely with the Federal Government Commissioner for Culture and Media. Following a resolution passed by the German Parliament, the Bundestag, it receives funding from the Federal Ministry of Transport, Building and Urban Development.

== Foundation and history ==
Formed on 2 July 2009, the foundation appointed its executive board on 1 November of that year. The foundation is the body commissioning the construction of the Humboldt Forum, a unique cultural project, and will be the building's future owner. According to its statutes, the foundation pursues exclusively and directly charitable purposes of the promotion of art and culture, education, international sentiments and tolerance in all areas of culture, international understanding, as well as monument protection and preservation. With this in mind, the foundation organizes its own events, exhibitions, readings and much more. With the Ethnological Museum of Berlin and the Museum of Asian Art, the State of Berlin and the Humboldt University of Berlin in the Humboldt Forum, the Foundation for the Humboldt Forum in the Berlin Palace will provide the Prussian Cultural Heritage Foundation with suitable premises for use free of charge.

== Foundation's purpose ==
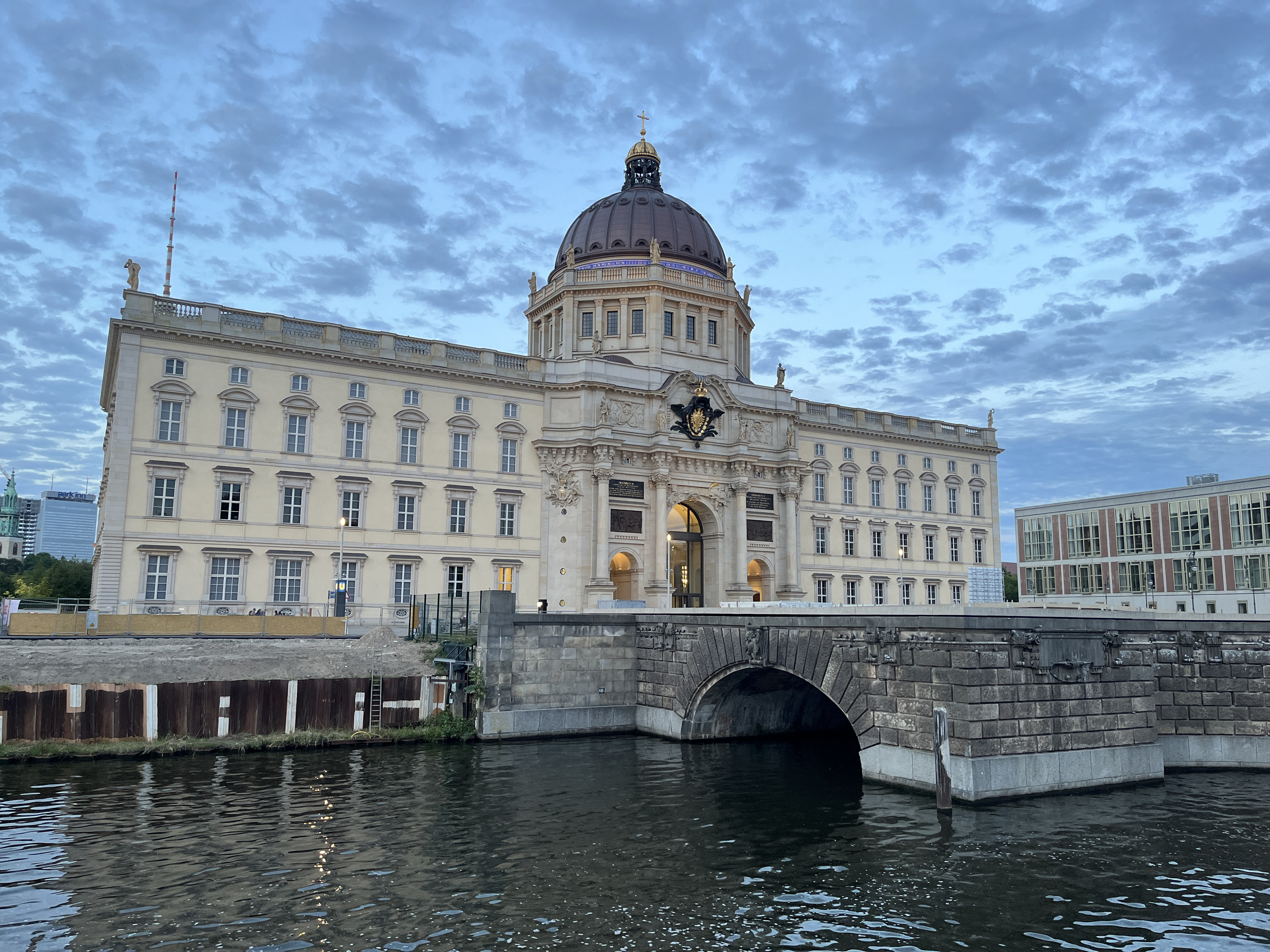
Berlin Palace

The Foundation for the Humboldt Forum in the Berlin Palace is the owner and builder of the Humboldt Forum in Berlin Castle. The Federal Office for Building and Regional Planning is responsible for construction management for the construction project. The most important tasks of the foundation are beyond that:

- Coordinating and bundling the interests of the partners in the Humboldt Forum.
- The organization of a permanent exhibition with the theme "Historical Centre Berlin - Identity and Reconstruction".

This once-in-a-century project has aroused fascination and discussion from the start. Persuasive, enthusiastic involvement by the general public was the decisive signal for the Bundestag, the German parliament, to back the plans and provide public funds. This highly symbolic construction project, with its unique aim of bringing culture and academia into living discourse, is reliant on the active support of everyone who wants to make a lasting mark on this historic site.

In January 2016, the foundation was renamed to Stiftung Humboldt Forum im Berliner Schloss.

== Construction project ==
On 4 July 2002, the German Bundestag adopted the recommendation of the International Commission of Experts on the Historical Centre of Berlin - a recommendation that was narrowly passed. The resolution adopted for this purpose provides for the urban redevelopment of the Spreeinsel to be largely based on the historical town plan and for the development of the palace area to be based on the cubature of the former Berlin palace. Furthermore, the German Bundestag followed the commission's recommendation to rebuild the baroque façades on the north, west and south sides as well as in the Schlüterhof.

=== Reconstruction of the Berlin Palace ===
On 21 December 2007, the Federal Office for Building and Regional Planning announced a competition for the reconstruction of the Berlin City Palace and the construction of the Humboldt Forum Berlin. First prize went to Franco Stella for his design. Structural work began in June 2013. After the reconstruction of the Berlin Palace, the building complex is to house the future Humboldt Forum, which is scheduled to open in 2019.

=== Contributions ===
The additional costs of the reconstruction of the baroque façades compared to a contemporary façade design amount to 80 million euros. These 80 million euros will be raised through a private collection of donations. In particular, the non-profit association Förderverein Berliner Schloss has been collecting money since 2004 for the reconstruction of the baroque façades with a broad-based collection of donations.

The acquisition of donations for the reconstruction of the historic façades and the construction of the Humboldt Forum is also one of the foundation's tasks. As a cooperation partner of all private institutions that collect donations for the reconstruction of the Berlin Palace, all donations are received by the foundation, which finances the reconstruction of the baroque façades.

== Humboldt Forum ==
The Prussian Cultural Heritage Foundation will show the non-European collections of its National Museums in Berlin on the second and third floors. On the first floor, the Workshops of Knowledge, the knowledge archives of these museums, some of which are UNESCO World Heritage Sites, will be housed.

== Pictures ==
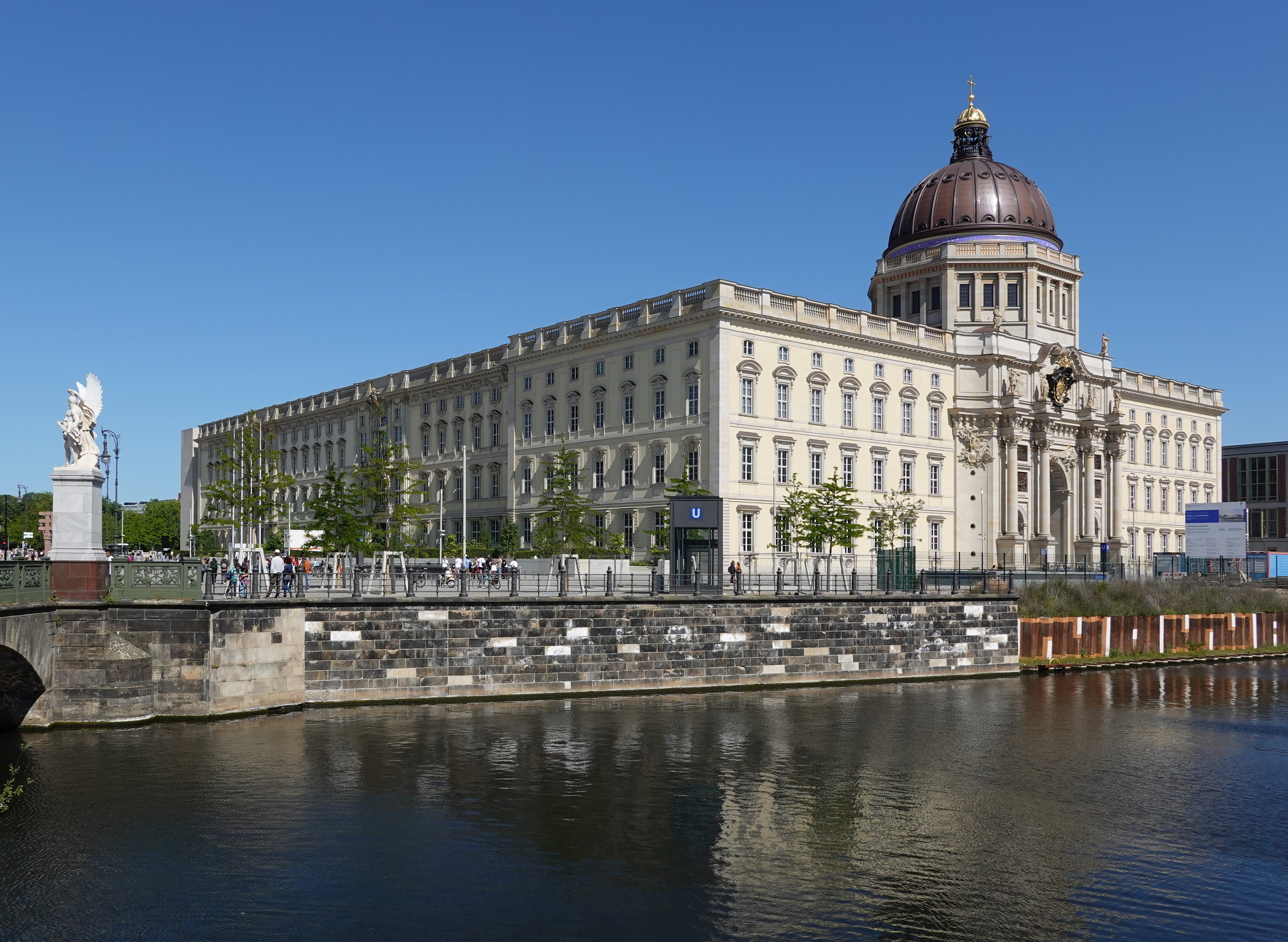
The reconstructed Berlin Palace

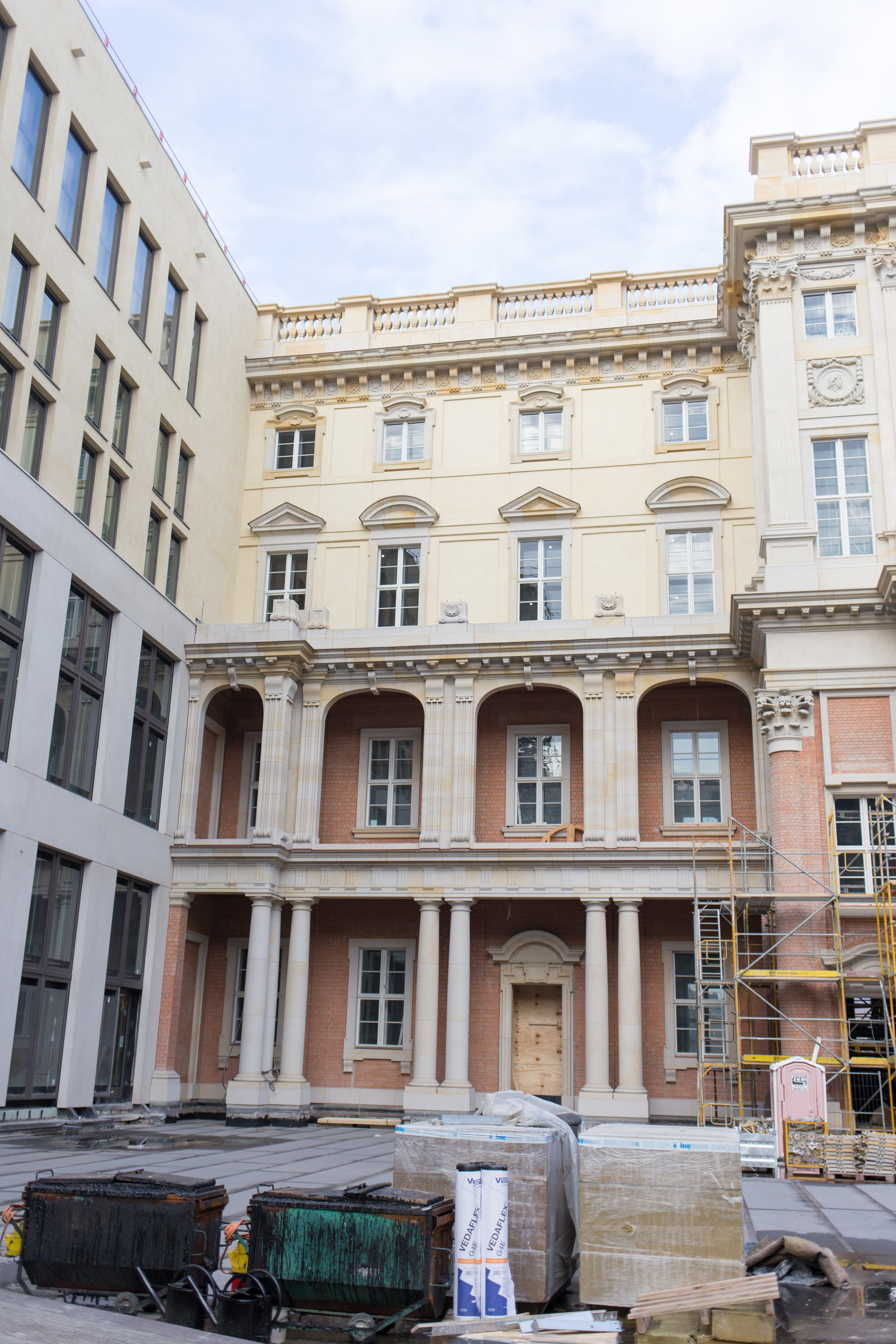
Inner courtyard

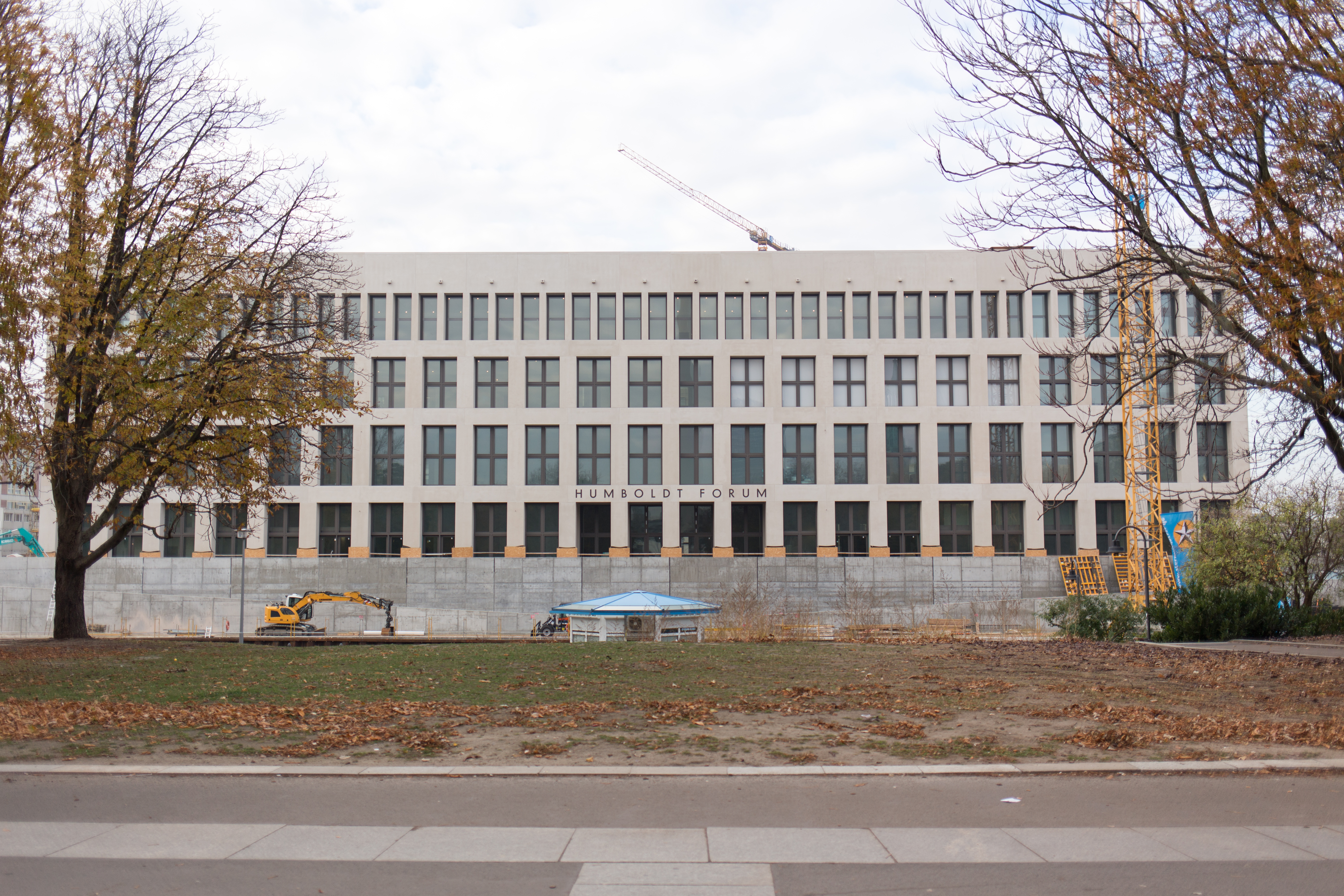
East façade

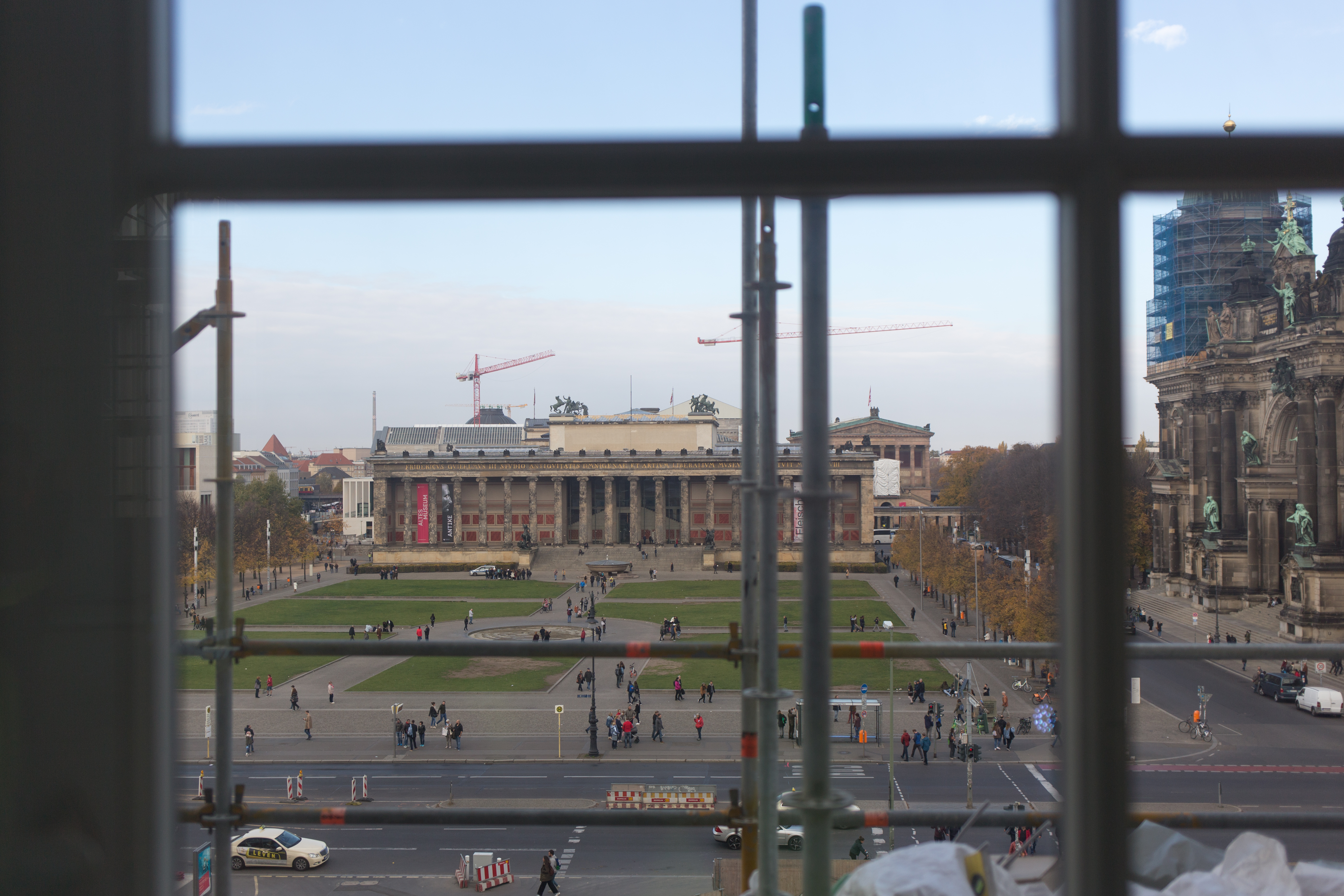
View from the palace to the Altes Museum

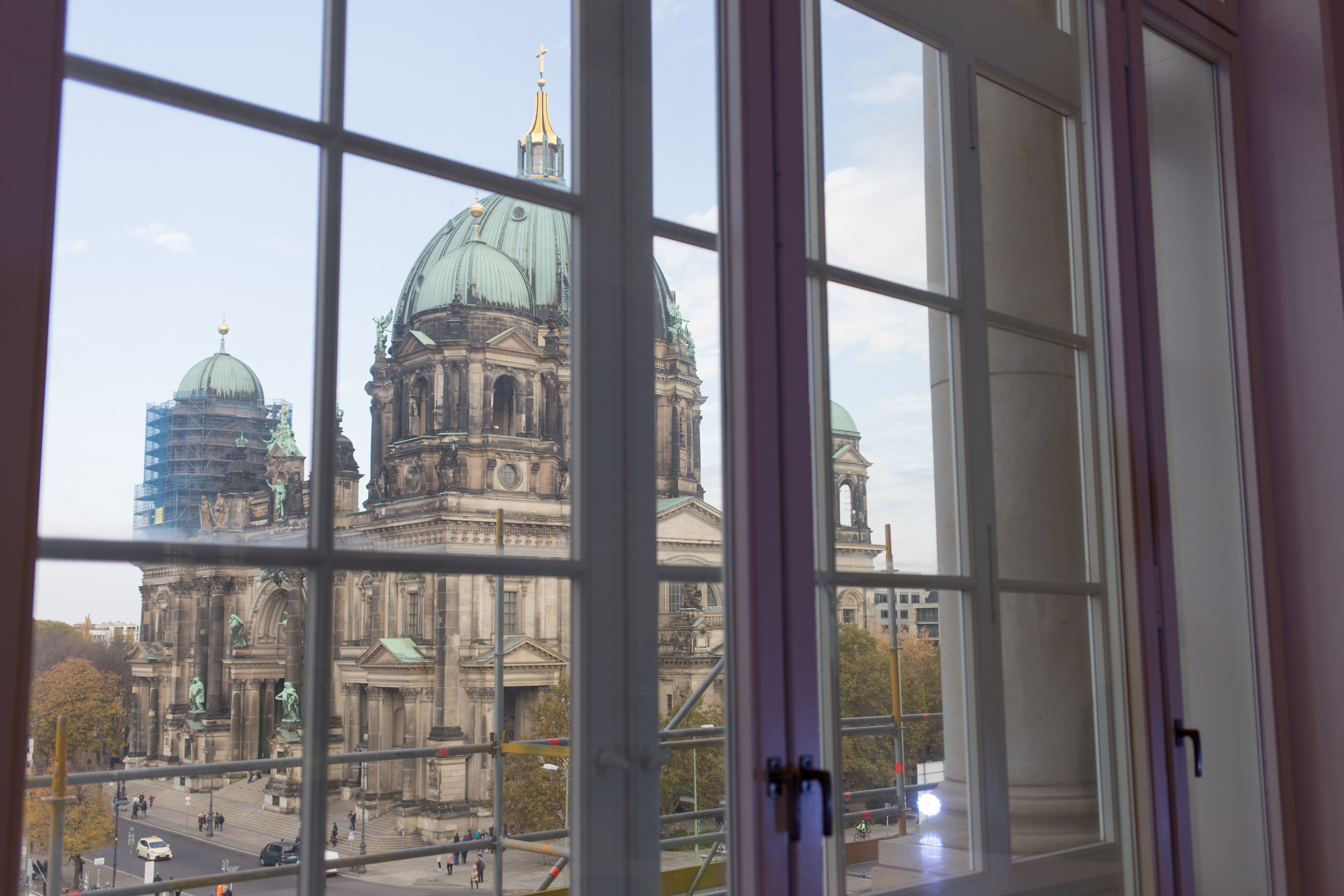
View from the palace to the Berliner Dom

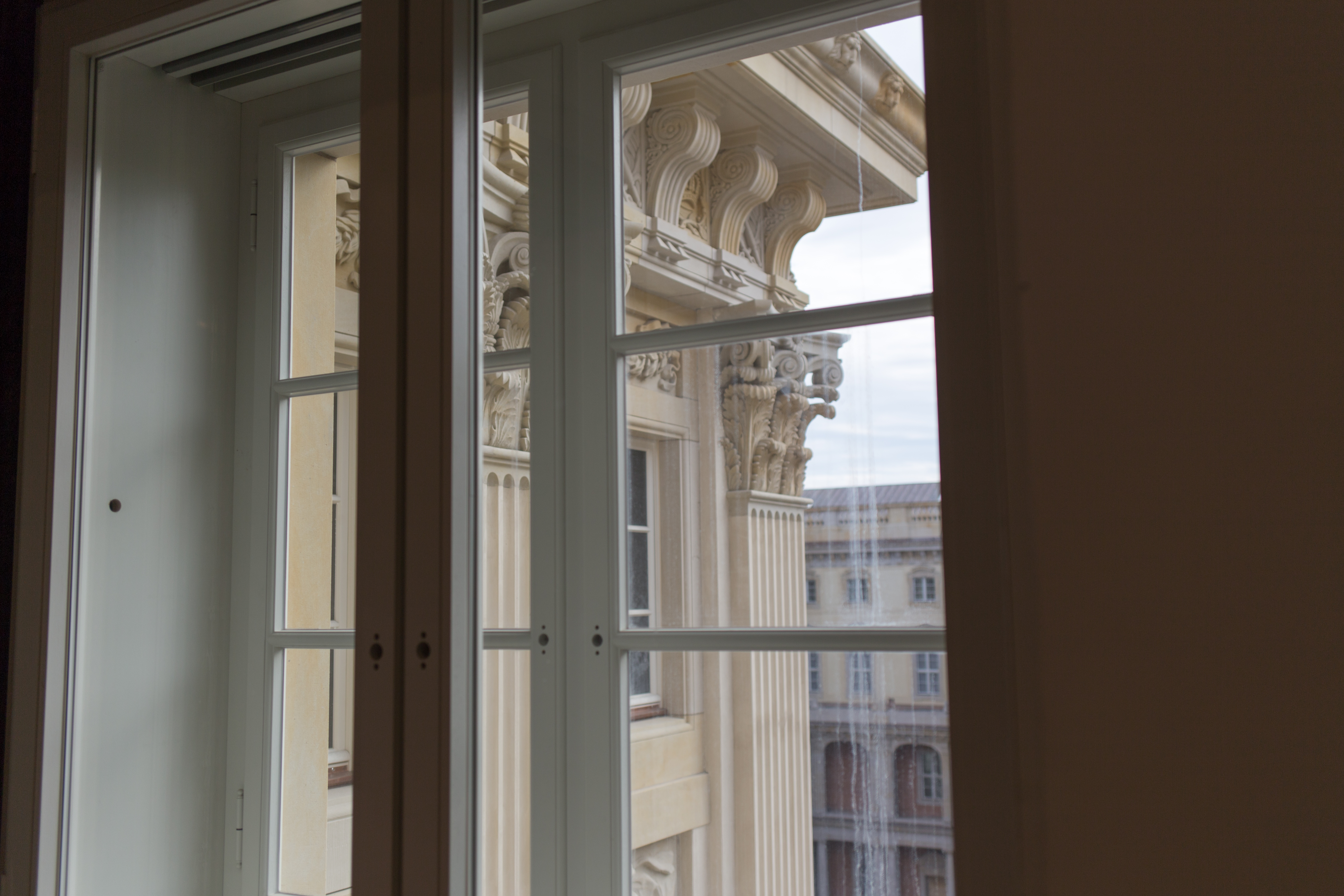
View from the palace to the Schlüterhof

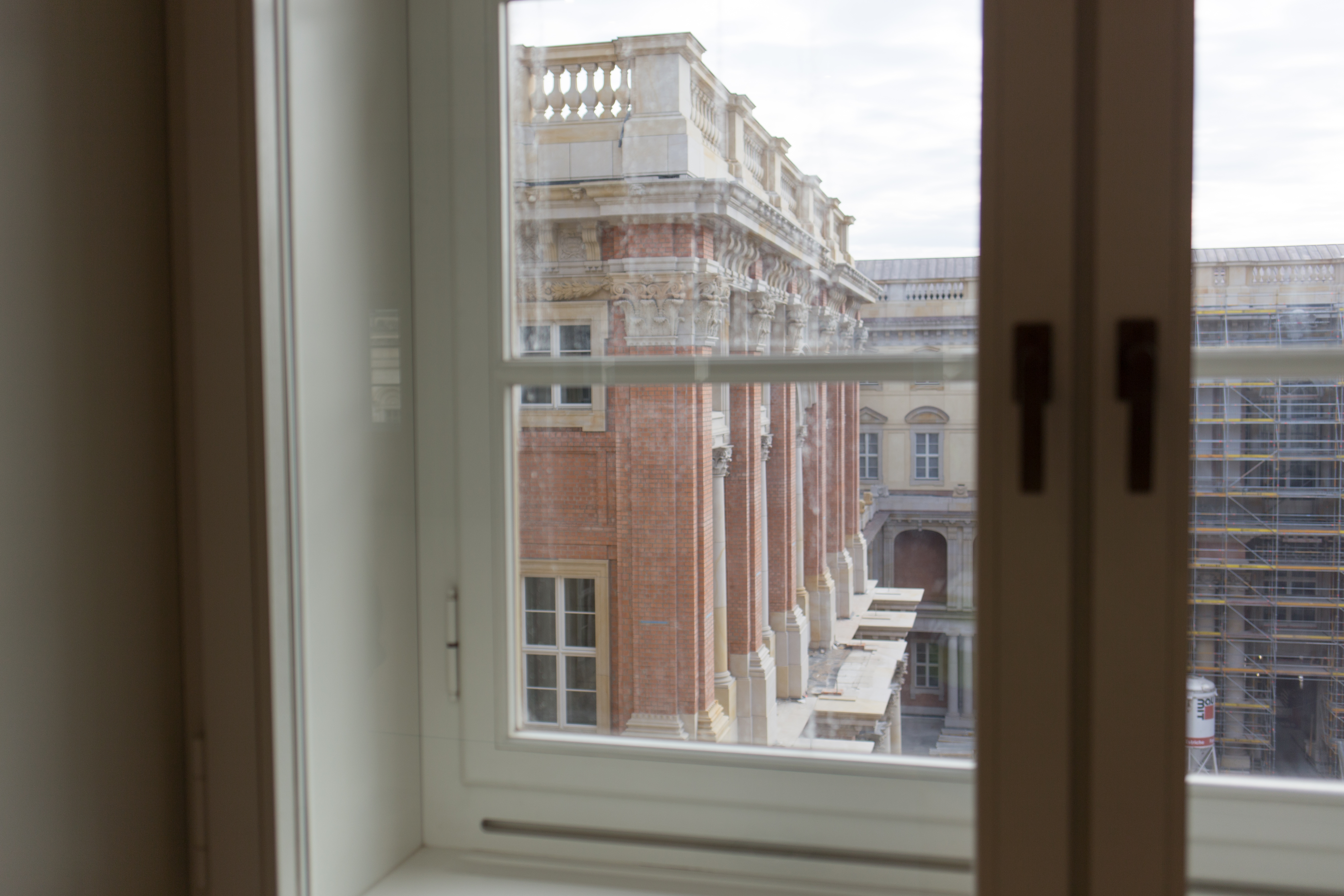
View from the palace to the Schlüterhof

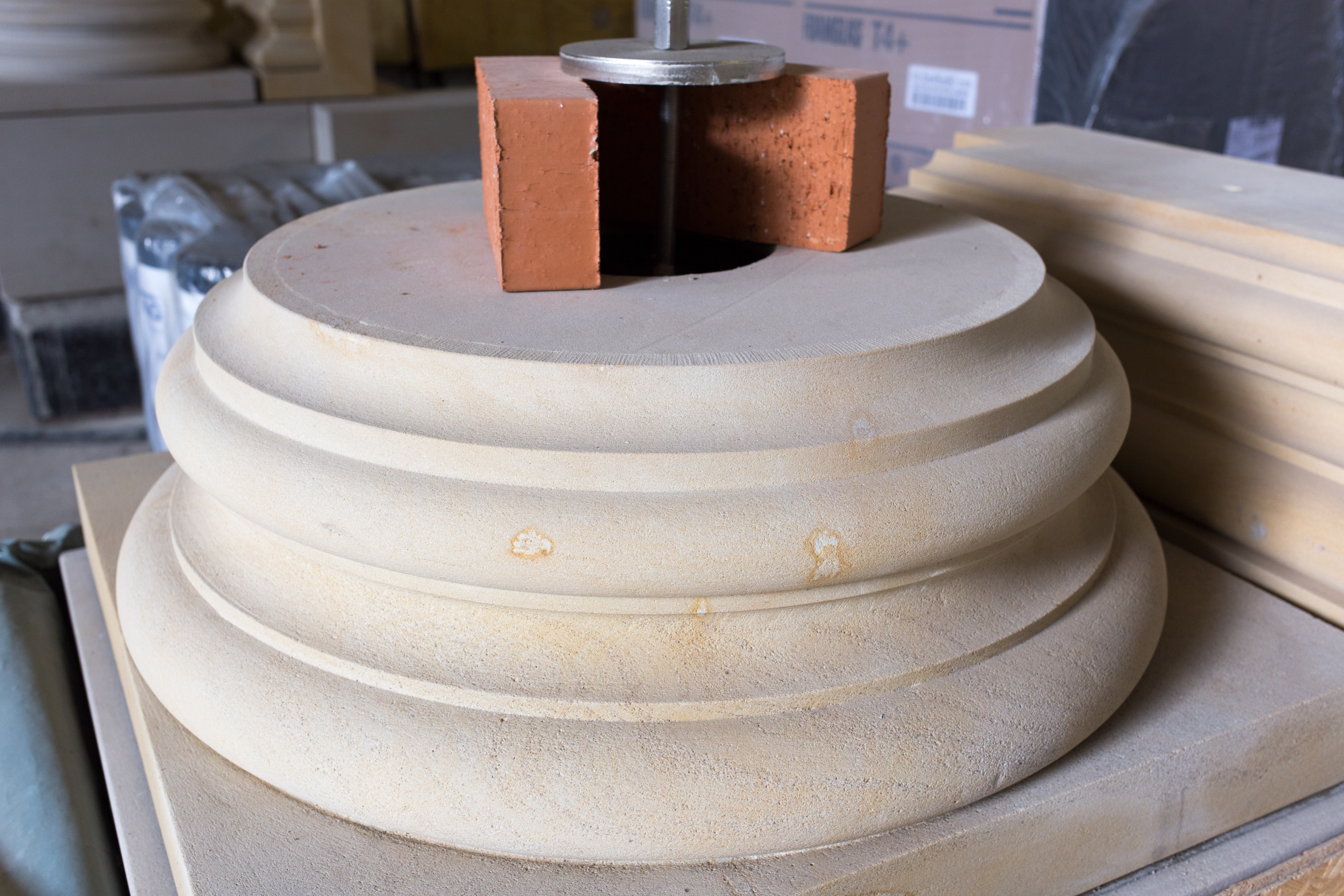
Column under construction

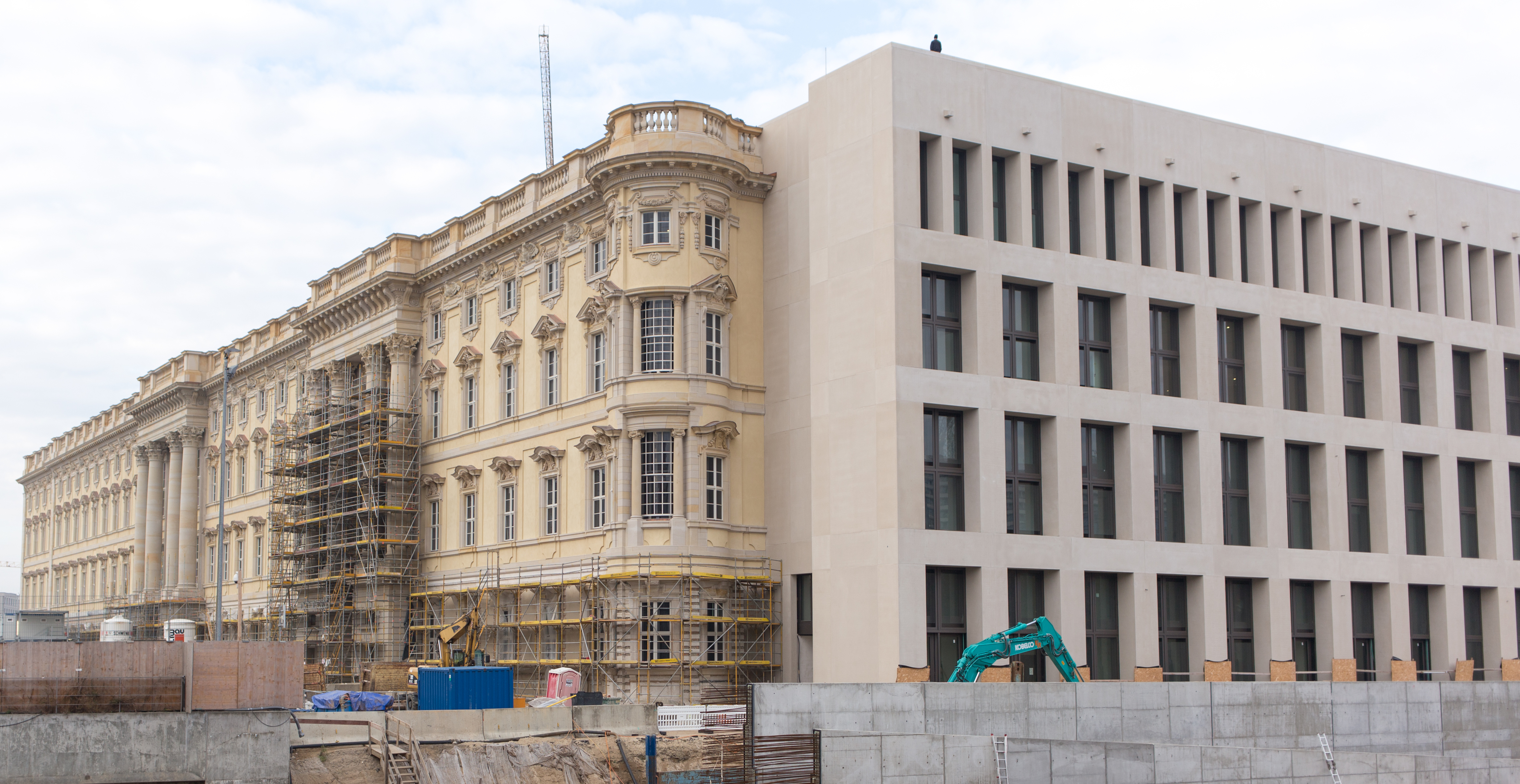
South and east façade
